= Yamatai Kyushu Theory =

Theory that the Yamatai kingdom was located in Kyushu

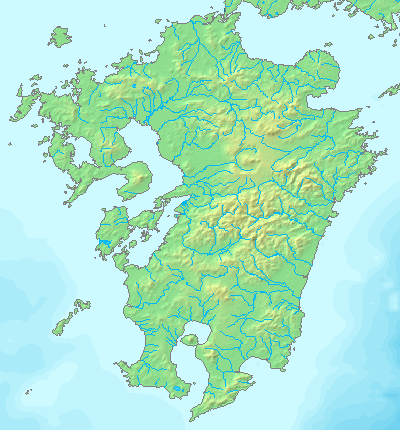
Topographic map of Kyushu area

The Yamatai Kyushu Theory is the theory that the Yamatai kingdom was located in Kyushu rather than in Honshu, specifically Kinai (now Kinki region), where the capital was located in the Kofun period, as the Yamatai Honshu Theory proposes. The Honshu Theory is currently the dominant theory, based on archaeological findings.

The Yamatai Kyushu theory instead proposes that the original capital of the Yamatai kingdom of Japan was located in the island of Kyushu, and when the Kofun period began, the Yamato Kingship moved its capital east to the Kinai region, first in the Yamato Province (Nara prefecture), then Kyoto in the Yamashiro Province (Kyoto Prefecture).

== Overview ==
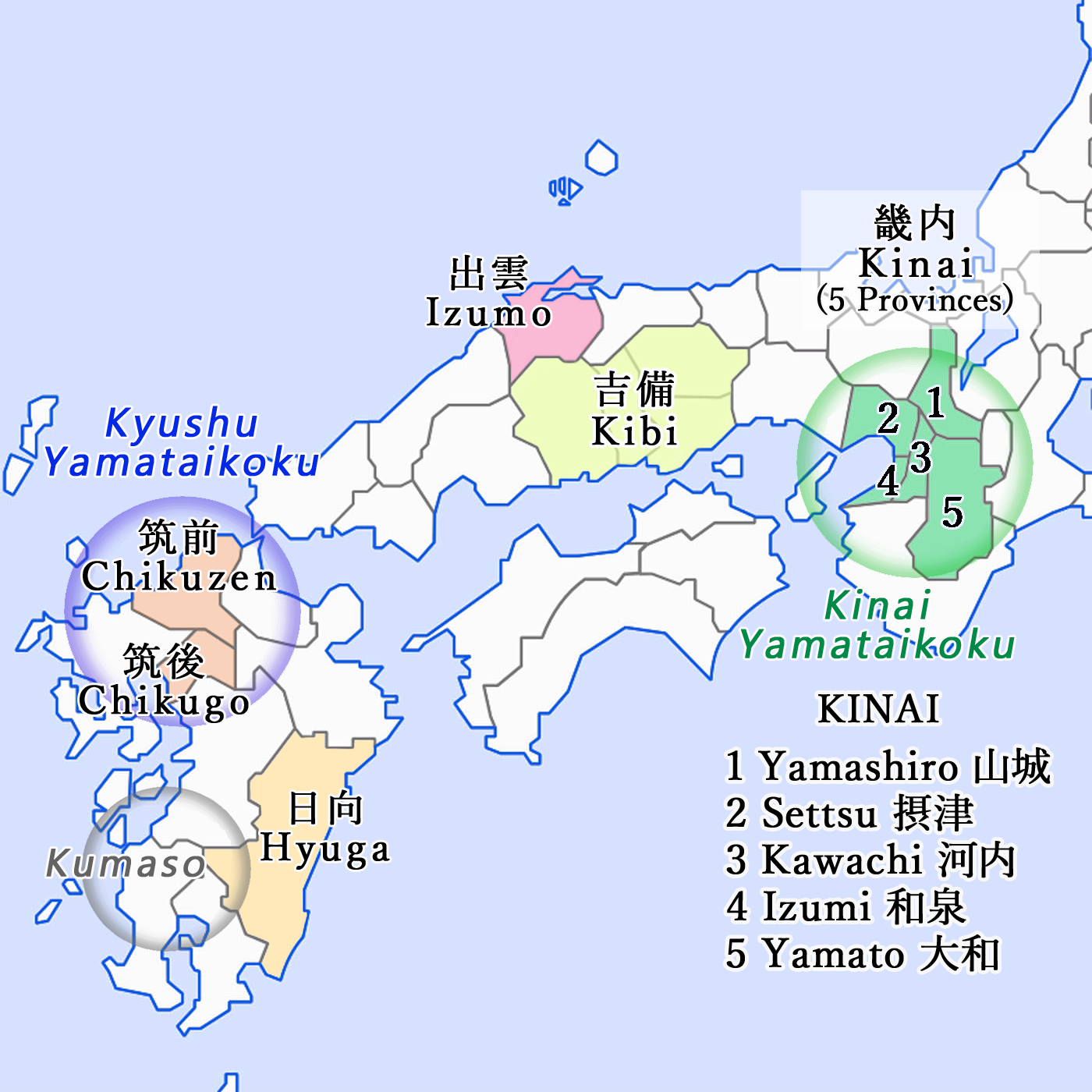
Locations of Yamataikoku, Kyūshū and Kinai (Honshū).

In the Edo period, Arai Hakuseki advocated the "Kinai Yamataikoku theory" which suggests that Yamatai was located in Yamato Province, ie. Nara prefecture (大和) in the Kinai, Honshu. Later, Arai advocated a different theory, the "Kyūshū Yamataikoku theory" which says Yamatai-koku was located in "Yamato county (山門-郡, Yamato-gun)" in Chikugo Province (Fukuoka prefecture, Northern Kyushu) in his book "Foreign Affairs Chronicle".

Since then, the mainstream of academic circles has been divided into two major theories:

1. the "Honshu theory" (supported by Naitō Torajirō et al.) holds that Yamatai-koku was located in Honshu. According to this theory, the Yamatai-koku was essentially continuous with the Yamato Kingship, with its capital in roughly the same region, and the Yamatai-koku transformed into the Yamato Kingship when the Kofun period began.
2. the "Kyushu theory" (supported by Shiratori Kurakichi et al.) holds that Yamatai-koku was located in Kyushu.

The Kyūshū theory has itself been divided into two schools. One school insists the "Kyushu Yamatai-koku" moved to the East and became the Imperial House of Japan. The other school insists the "Kyushu Yamatai-koku" did not move, and was conquered by the forced of the Yamato (based in Kinai).

Masao Kume proposed the Two dynasties parallel theory (二王朝並立論) which states that the "Queen's Country" (女王国) of "more than 2,000 miles from the [Daifang] Commandery to the "Queen's Country"" (自郡至女王国萬二千餘里) is different from the Yamatai Kingdom (邪馬台国) of Thirty days by sea (海路三十日) (20 days of water travel south to Toumakoku (南至投馬国水行二十日) and Ten days of water travel south to the land of Yamatai (南至邪馬台国水行十日) and the "Queen's country" in Tsukushi moved to Kinai after the "Civil War of Wa (倭国大乱)". It is assumed that the new royal capital, which was the capital of Japan, is Yamatai.

== Evidence for the Honshu Theory ==
In the 1960s, it was thought that artifacts from the period of the Yamataikoku were abundant in Kyushu while those from the Kinai region were scarce in the Kinai region. The National Institute for Radiocarbon Dating and Dendrochronology has presented a chronology based on radiocarbon dating and dendrochronology that compares the tombs of Himiko and the Yamato imperial court to those of Yamatai and Himiko, and that the establishment of the Yamato Imperial Court dates back to that time. Some have suggested that radiocarbon dating of pottery from the Kinai region by the National Institute of Japanese Archaeology and Dating suggests that the establishment of the early state in the Yamato region of the Kinai region dates back to the same period as the Yamataikoku. (Note: This is because, in principle, dendrochronology can only determine the upper limit of the age of a monument, the number of experts is small, and the standard dendrochronological curve in Japan was created by a single research group, which does not even publish accurate data and does not allow for follow-up verification. It has also been pointed out that radiocarbon dating does not allow for follow-up verification because taking measurement data can damage artifacts and requires equipment.)。. According to this Kinai theory, there was at least one power in 3rd century Japan that was able to secure transportation routes from Yamato to the continent, and it can be said that a power with great influence over the entire of western Japan centering on Yamato, namely the "Yamato Kingdom," was already established at this time.

The Makimuku ruins site is considered by some researchers to be the best candidate for the center of the Yamatai, and may be the site that proves the Yamatai Honshu Theory. In 2011, a part of another large building was found about 5 meters to the east of the large building ruins, and the building ruins may have been built in the late 3rd century or later.

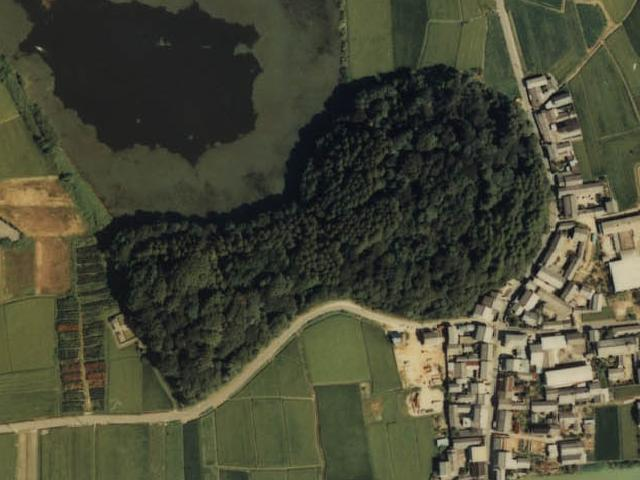
Hashihaka Kofun

The Hashihaka kofun ( 箸墓古墳 ( はしはかこふん)) is a megalithic tomb (kofun) located in Sakurai City, Nara Prefecture, Japan. The Hashihaka kofun is considered to be the first large keyhole-shaped kofun constructed in Japan and is associated with the emergence of the Yamato Kingship. It is sometimes considered the birthplace of the Kofun system of tombs which is highly linked to the emergence of a state level society. (Note: Satoshi Ohira argues that although Tsuide's theory is supported insofar as it explains the establishment of the political system represented by the anterior-posterior mound and its continuous development, he does not necessarily agree with the theory that the difference in size indicates a relationship of domination and subordination between the chiefs throughout the country. The fact that they had to share the same tomb type, even though they were superior in size, should be taken into consideration, and should be regarded as a coalition or alliance rather than a domination relationship.)

== Basic rationale for the Kyushu Theory ==
The basic arguments for the Kyushu theory of the Yamatai Kingdom include the following.

- The Wajinden in the Book of Wei describes the route and distance from the Wei to Yamatai-koku. The route started from Daifang commandery. It went along the Southern coast of the Korean peninsula, through the Kan-koku (Mohan), then reached to the Kuya-kan-koku (Kuya-han). The route crossed the sea, and reached to the land of Kyushu (Wa), where there were 30 countries and the "Queen's country" (Yamataikoku).
- Considering the 12,000 li distance from Daifang commandery to the "Queen's country" (Yamatai-koku), taken as a travelling distance rather than a straight line, it would take 10,500 li to get to Ito-koku, which is located in Fukuoka Prefecture. The remaining 1,500 li (three times the distance of 500 li from Ito-koku to Matsuro-koku, which is located in Karatsu City, Saga Prefecture), is not enough to locate the Yamatai Kingdom beyond Kyushu. (Note: Miyake Yonekichi states that the 12,000 li is the distance to Fumi-koku, where the distance is known, and Yamada Yoshio states that this is not the actual distance, which is partly unknown, but merely the sum of the 7,000 li to Kuya-kan-koku and the 5,000 li of the circumference of the Japanese land. This is not a combination of the real distances, which are partly unknown, but merely the sum of the 7,000 li to Kuya-kan-koku and the 5,000 li of the Japanese land. The Takehiko Furuta, who advocates the Kyushu dynasty theory, insists a reading that "the same route is marked twice, as distance and number of days, for the sake of accuracy".)
- The state of Kuna-koku (Kununokuni), which was recorded as being in conflict with the Yamatai-koku, could be identified with the polity of Kumaso, and mentions of an official of Kuna-koku named "Kukochi-hiko" could be identified as another transliteration of "Kikuchi-hiko", a reference to Kyushu's Kikuchi River. (Note: The Kinai theory does not seem to give any special interpretation to the official name, even if it considers Kuna-koku to be a force from Keno or the Tōkai region, such as Kuwana or Kano. Naitō Konan, who holds the Kinai theory, ascribes Kuna-koku to Kumaso and "Kukochi-hiko" to Kikuchi-hiko, in view of the violent clashes between the imperial court and Kumaso in the reign of Emperor Keiko, which he considers to be close to the time of the Yamatai-koku. This would mean that the direction is correct here, but he says there is no problem with the description of Kuna-koku because it belongs to a different system from the itinerary article. In Weilüe it is written "拘右智卑狗", but this can be regarded as a typographical error, since in ancient Japanese the vowel never appeared in the middle of a word. The Kibi, Izumo, and Higashi-Shikoku theories consider the Kuna kingdom to be a Kawachi power.)
- There is a theory that the Hashihaka grave mound, which is said to be the oldest keyhole-shaped mound in Nara Prefecture Sakurai City, was built in the latter half of the 3rd century and is considered to be Himiko's burial mound. However, after the death of Himiko, a male king ascended to the throne, and it is recorded that the country was in turmoil again. It is unlikely for the polity to build a burial mound with the largest mound at that time when the country was in turmoil. In addition, there are no traces of large-scale violence in the area surrounding the tomb. Also, the tombs of neighboring places such as the Korean Peninsula at that time were all around 30 meters on each side, and it is unreasonable to assume that Japan was the only country to build such a huge tomb (i.e. the Hashihaka Tomb). In addition, the Museum, Archaeological Institute of Kashihara, Nara Prefecture, which in 2008 conducted the Archaeological excavation of the Hokenoyama burial mound, which is said to predate the Hashihaka Tomb in terms of age, concluded that the burial mound was built in the middle of the 3rd century based on the excavated artifacts. However, because the range of Radiocarbon dating results of burial chamber wood is reported to include the first half of the 4th century, some have questioned the dating of the middle of the 3rd century.

Advocates of the Kyushu theory of the Yamataikoku include Arai Hakuseki, Shiratori Kurakichi, Dairoku Harada, Taku Tanaka, Takehiko Furuta, Kenzaburo Torigoe, Toshiaki Wakai, Biten Yasumoto, Toshio Hoga and others. In addition, it is said that research based on domestic materials such as "Kiki" tends not to be taken into consideration, despite the indications of Taro Sakamoto's "The Birth of the Nation" and Hidesaburo Hara, and Toshiaki Wakai said about this tendency before the war. He criticizes the repressed theory of Sokichi Tsuda as being caused by being touted even after the war.

== See also ==
- Wajinden
