= Fumikoku =

Historical Japanese State

Map illustrating the path from the Daifeng commandery to Yamatai, and its distances in the Wajinden.

Fumikoku (不弥国) is one of the countries that existed in the Japanese archipelago in the 3rd century.

== Outline ==
According to The History of the Three Kingdoms, Wei's Dongyi biography, commonly known as Wajin Biography, and History of the Northern Dynasties. According to Nukoku (or Itokoku), Fiya-guni (不彌國) is located 100 ri east of Nukoku, and its chief is called Tamomi and its deputy is called Hinamori, with over 1000 houses. The chief is called Tamomi and his deputy is called Hinamori, and there are more than 1,000 families.

There is little difference between the various theories regarding the route from Tsushima Province to Nukuni, but the location of Toumakoku and Yamataikoku differ greatly between the Kyushu and Honshu theories, and according to the direct route theory, Fumikoku is the route to these two countries. Therefore, the location of Fumikoku is the dividing line between the Kyushu and Honshu theory.

In addition, the fact that the article on "Rikugyo Suigyo (陸行水行)" is different from the articles on the journey to other countries and is heterogeneous (Note: It is said that land travel from Matsurokoku to Itsukoku is also mixed.). In addition, since there are no articles on land travel by water or Toumadoku in the oldest extant record of Wei Xuan, there is a theory that these articles were mixed in when it was copied later, and that it actually only went south from Fumikuni to Yamataikuni.。

Furthermore, the article on "Overland and Oversea Routes" is distinct from other travel records to foreign countries. (Note: The overland travel from Matsurokoku to Ito was also considered a mixed record.) In the oldest surviving record, the "Weilüe," there is no mention of overland and oversea routes or the country of Tobamare, leading some to believe that these articles were added in later copies and that in reality, the journey was simply a southward journey from Fumi no Kuni to Yamatai.

== See also ==
- Wa (Japan)
- Wajin (ancient people)
- History of the Northern Dynasties
