= Takehiko Furuta =

Japanese historian (1926–2015)

- 古田 武彦 （ふるた たけひこ）
- Born: August 8, 1926; Kitakata, Fukushima Prefecture, Japan
- Died: October 14, 2015 (aged 89); Kyoto, Japan
- Education: Tohoku Imperial University Graduated from the Department of Japanese Thought History, Faculty of Law and Literature
- Occupation: Intellectual historian / ancient history researcher
- Writing career
- Period: 1969–2011
- Genre: History
- Subjects: History of Japanese Thought, Ancient History of Japan, Shinran
- Notable works: There was no "Yamatai country"; Lost Kyushu dynasty; Stolen myth
- Notable awards: Kanazawa University Akatsuki Award

Takehiko Furuta (August 8, 1926 – October 14, 2015) was a Japanese history of ideas scholar, ancient history fabricator, conspiracy theorist, and former professor at Showa Pharmaceutical University. He specialized in Shinran and other medieval Japanese philosophical history and conspiracy theory. He proposed the highly controversial Kyushu dynasty theory, to little academic acclaim.

== Biography ==
=== From birth to high school teaching days ===
Born in Kitakata City, Fukushima Prefecture. Raised in Hiroshima Prefecture following the transfer of his father, an English teacher at an old junior high school. Graduated from Tohoku Imperial University in 1948.

After graduating from university, he became a public high school teacher (local public employee) and taught Japanese and social studies as a teacher at Matsumoto Fukashi High School in Nagano Prefecture, Kobe Mori High School, Hyogo Prefectural Minatogawa High School, and Kyoto Municipal Rakuyo Technical High School. During his tenure, he was known for his research on Shinran. He was a witness for the plaintiff (Saburo Ienaga) in the Ienaga Textbook Trial regarding the statements about Shinran.

=== Activities in the study of literary history ===
In 1969 he published his theory of Ichibankoku in History Magazine. In 1970, he left teaching and devoted himself to research. He has presented his own unique image of ancient history centered on the Kyushu dynasty theory, and has forced academic circles to reconsider their prevailing theories.

Some of these theories, such as the theory that Emperor Jimmu actually existed, are based on trust in the contents of the Chronicles, and are therefore considered to be either Shakugaku- or right-wing. He also claims a theory denying the falsification of the Kotaiō Stele. In 1985, he conducted a field survey of the Gwanggaeto Stele to prove his theory and concluded that "there was no intentional alteration of the inscription"., to prove his theory. His active involvement earned him a certain amount of recognition from the academic community. Furuta's articles were published in Shigaku zasshi and Shirin, which attracted the attention of the academic community, and in his early years he was often mentioned by the mass media. This has attracted a large number of supporters and endorsers, as well as a number of people who have been fighting over his theory, including Minori Yasumoto, (Note: Misonori Yasumoto once evaluated Takehiko Furuta as "capable of discussing the issue on a concrete, empirical level", but he has changed his view and criticized Furuta's theory in a series of books ("There Was No 'Yamatai'" and "The False Kyushu Dynasty" as well as the magazine "Yamatai Quarterly" and other publications).)who argued with him over his own theory. (Note: Recently, Takehiko Furuta, in "Critique of the Historical Records of the Kyushu Dynasty," in Gakushikai Hou (Bulletin of the Japan Academy of Sciences) No. 857 2006-II, states that "the academic community's response to this is lacking.) At one time, the hypothesis (the theory of 邪馬壹国, as well as the content of the Shinran research period) appeared as a footnote in high school textbooks. The "Citizens' Society for the Study of Ancient Times" was organized as a group of supporters and readers, and the magazine "Citizens' Ancient Times" was published from 1979.

He also attracted attention in Shinran studies, and in 1975 he proposed the theory of the authenticity of the Sanmu-ki, a book that had been theorized to be a fake, and which kicked off a controversy in the academic world. In 1979, he was a part-time lecturer at the Ryukoku University Faculty of Letters. From April 1984 to March 1996, he worked at Showa Pharmaceutical University as a Cultural history professor.

=== Beginning of research on the "History of the Three Counties Outside Tsugaru" and its impact ===
He encountered Wada family documents such as "Tsugaru soto sangunshi"(lit. 'History of the Three Counties Outside Tsugaru') and positively evaluated their contents.。Furthermore, even after strong suspicions that the book was a forgery were raised in later years, he remained supportive of its owner, Kihachiro Wada、and actively engaged in research, including writing an article in the "Bulletin" of Showa Pharmaceutical University. This led to a split in the Citizens' Society for Ancient Research, and some members, mainly from the Kansai region, who were in charge of the management of the society, left Furuta. (Note: Members away from Furuta include those in Tohoku, Kanto, and Hokuriku.) However, they were reluctant to deal with ancient history in general other than Jindai moji and the Wada family documents, as they needed sufficient research.

After retiring from Showa Pharmaceutical University in March 1996 (Heisei 8), he returned to Muko City, Kyoto, where he continued to write and lecture, and in May 2006 (Heisei 18) he founded and directly edited the magazine "There Was No Truth in History".

The Cultural History Laboratory at Showa Pharmaceutical University was discontinued after Furuta's retirement. The Citizens' Society for Ancient Research continued for a while as a research group independent of Furuta, but the journal was terminated and disbanded in December 2002 (Heisei 14). (Note: Those in this stream have joined Shoichiro Shirasaki's "Ancient Sea of Japan Culture," a well-known researcher of the Yamato Kinai theory of Yamato in the Yamataikoku region, to publish the quarterly "The Sea of Ancient History.) The people who left in support of Furuta formed several study groups, including the "Society of Furuta Historiography" and the "Society for the Study of Multidisciplinary Antiquity," and they united to publish an annual journal, "New Ancient Studies," in which Furuta refuted the claims of the Wada family document forgery group.。

=== The Discovery of the "Kansei Original" and Its Aftermath ===
In 2007 (Heisei 19), Furuta claimed to have discovered the "Kansei Genbunshi" of "Tsugaru soto sangunshi" and published a photographic version of it the following year. The book includes an expert opinion piece by Kazuhiko Kasaya (Professor, Research Department, International Research Center for Japanese Studies). (Note: A press release from ContentWorks Corporation (July 24, 2008) states, "Includes an expert opinion by Professor Kazuhiko Kasaya of the International Research Center for Japanese Studies. It has been proven that the Kansei original is a document created during the Edo period." It states.) (Note: Note that prior to the publication of this book, Furuta claimed to have conducted radiocarbon dating of the "Kansei original," but there is no mention of this.) On the other hand, the claim that the handwriting matches that of Kihachiro Wada and others claim that the cover is in Wada Kihachiro's handwriting and the contents are a memorandum (probably leaked from a temple) for a monk to create a Chinese poem.

In 2009 (Heisei 21), he claimed to have found quotations from the Kokki and Tennōki in the Wada family documents. At the same time, he ceased publication of "It never happened".

Since 2010, he has been republishing "There was no 'Yamataikoku'", "The Lost Kyushu Dynasty", "Stolen Myths", and other works on ancient history as "Takehiko Furuta: Collection of Ancient History" from Minerva Shobo. In addition, on September 10, 2011, he published "Himika Himika: Demons on the Road, Few Who See Them" as part of Minerva's selection of Japanese biographies.

He died on October 14, 2015, at a hospital in Nishikyō-ku, Kyoto, Japan.

== Hypothesis and its evaluation ==
=== Hypothetical ===
- The name of the country in "Wajinden" should not be Yamatai, but rather "Yamai (邪馬壹)" should be written correctly as in the original text of the "Wajinden" handed down today. The location is assumed to be on the shore of Hakata Bay.
- Assumes that short ri (1 ri 75m-90m) was officially used by the Wei Jin dynasty as well as in "Wajinden".
- The bare country and the black tooth country mentioned in "Wajinden" are located in the northern half of the South American continent (Ecuador). See History of Ecuador.
- Consistently, Wakoku is assumed to be the Kyushu Dynasty, from which the Japanese nation received the Golden Seal. The Battle of Baekgang caused its rapid decline, and it was absorbed into the Imperial House of Japan (Japan), which was a branch of the Kinki Dynasty.
- The Yayoi royal tombs at the Suku Okamoto site (Kasuga City, Fukuoka Prefecture) are dated back to the third century (common theory puts the date around the later first century).
- Criticizes the commonly accepted theory of Wei mirrors and advocates the theory of domestic production of triangular-rimmed animal and animal mirrors.
- He proposed the multidimensional view of ancient history that there were kingdoms in various parts of the archipelago, including the theory of the Kyushu Dynasty. Based on an analysis of the Inariyama Kofun Inariyama Sword inscription and other evidence, he believes that there was a great king in the Kanto region as well.
- Fukuzawa Yukichi, in his "Gakumon no Susume" (Encouragement of Learning), states that the first sentence "Heaven does not create a man above another man nor a man below another man". (Note: Common belief is that it was adapted from the United States Declaration of Independence. See Keio Encyclopedia, No. 22 consideration, Heaven does not create mankind above mankind: .......)
- The rubbings of the Gwanggaeto Stele brought back by Keishin Sako were not tampered with (the only theory established by Takehiko Furuta).

=== Research style ===
- It calls for deciphering documents that are faithful to the original text. It criticizes the revision of historical documents and the revision of original texts, as has been done in the past.

=== Evaluation ===
- Because of its unique writing style and logical structure, it has many supporters among researchers in other fields and general readers.
- The initial publication of the "Yamai (邪馬壹)" theory was covered in the "Retrospect and Prospect" section of the Journal of Historical Studies.
- The "Tsugaru soto sangunshi" (A History of the Three Counties Outside of Tsugaru) uproar has taken its toll on the boom that once existed. However, he denied the theory that the Gwanggaeto Stele text was falsified, and he is still highly regarded in Shinran studies. (Note: While criticizing Furuta's theory, Taku Tanaka evaluates the theory denying the falsification of the Kotaio monument, the theory that Emperor Jinmu existed, and the theory of Kitakyushu as the place of departure for the eastern expedition of Jinmu. Tanaka Taku also criticizes Furuta's theory and evaluates the theory that falsification of the Kotaio monument was denied, the theory that Emperor Jinmu existed, and the theory of Kitakyushu as the place of departure for the eastern expedition of Jinmu.)
- According to Shunitsu Nakaji (former professor at Otemon Gakuin University), his most significant contribution is his rejection of the "unification concept" of ancient Japanese history, which holds that "the royal power of the Emperor Yamato was the sole central power in the Japanese archipelago from the seventh century onward. He argues that the unification concept has not been through argumentation, and that Japanese and Chinese documents and archaeological artifacts can be understood without difficulty through a pluralistic view of ancient history.
- Harada Minoru (writer and pseudohistorian), who studied under Furuta at Showa Pharmaceutical University, described Furuta's attitude toward "Tsugaru soto sangunshi" after his death as "adhering to fallacies" and "being in the realm of sophistry". He also said that his mentor Furuta's devotion to the theory of the authenticity of the "Tsugaru soto sangunshi" had a great influence on Harada's current stance against pseudographs.

== Views ==
An article by a denier of the "Tsugaru soto sangunshi" was also published in the anti-communist magazine "Zembo. The biggest opponent of the argument was Yasumoto Yoshinori, a supporter of the Association for Creating New History Textbooks. On the other hand, Furuta once published an article in Bunka Hyoron, a Communist Party-affiliated magazine. Tomoharu Fujita, a close friend of Furuta, was also an ideologue of the "Philosophy Section of the Osaka Materialism Society. However, some believe that Furuta is not a so-called leftist thinker.

Kazuhiko Kasaya, who defended Furuta by stating that the Wada family's "Kansei-genbara" documents "are all recognized as documents created during the Edo period" and "there is no one who does not consider these to be early modern documents", is a member of the Association for Textbook Improvement, a conservative group that is one of the successor organizations of the Association for Creating New History Textbooks.

Regarding World War II, which Japan fought in, he states that the Greater East Asia War, not the Pacific War or the Fifteen Years' War, is "the actual name in history. This is because, "Despite the 'name' of 'Greater East Asia Co-prosperity,' Japan invaded China and either 'insulted' the people of Asia or the people of other parts of the world who were in Asia, or 'insulted' the people of other parts of the world who were in Asia. and "slaughtered". As evidence of this, I would like to use this historical term without error or forgetting." but for examples of Furuta's use of the term, he refers to the Second Sino-Japanese War as the Japan-China Incident, In his conversation with Hisanosuke Yasukawa, he used the terms "Pacific War (Greater East Asia War)" and "Greater East Asia War" together thorough.

He claims that Emperor Jimmu is real, which is often regarded as Taboo in the academic world. This is the same view as that of his opponent, Yasumoto Yoshinori. (As to why the number of years of reign cannot be taken for granted, Furuta argues for a doubled chronology, while Yasumoto's argument is inspired by his own theory. (He points out that this is not the case.) In Furuta's case, Emperor Jinmu is regarded as a local Gōzoku, an offshoot of the Kyushu dynasty.

Furuta's stance on the Chronicles is that he is a "skeptic" in that he doubts the Kinki Emperor's view of history, but he is an "exegete" in that he does not deny all of the written content as a creation of a later era. Some of his former supporters, who have now parted company with Furuta, have defended Furuta's support of the "Tsugaru soto sangunshi" by saying, "Furuta's research stance is to first trust what is written, and that is probably why he was deceived. However, he is sometimes criticized for his arbitrary treatment of materials. Some defenders say that this is probably why they were deceived. However, he has also been criticized for his arbitrary treatment of materials .

He was close to conservative politicians such as Sadao Hirano and was once considered an "anti-Koreanist. (Note: According to the fifteenth volume of "Seeking Truth in Antiquity," he was also abused as an anti-Koreanist on the street, he said.) When he was a teacher at Matsumoto Fukashi High School, he denounced an exhibition by the Social Science Research Association praising the Soviet Union. In later years, he continued to criticize the assault and looting of repatriates by Soviet soldiers. When he was a teacher at Matsumoto Fukashi High School, he denounced an exhibition in praise of the Soviet Union by the Social Science Research Association. In later years, he continued to criticize the assault and looting of repatriates by Soviet soldiers.He also supports the enshrinement of Class A war criminals at Yasukuni Shrine. However, he also says that the war dead who fought on the side of Saigo's army in the Satsuma Rebellion and American soldiers who died in the Greater East Asia War should also be enshrined.

Kimigayo is a hymn to the Kyushu Dynasty, while Hinomaru is a song of praise for the Japanese archipelago, "a volcanic island in the sea" or "a rocky island in the sea". The history of the Hinomaru (Japanese flag) in Japan is too far and too long," and in response to the claim that the Hinomaru is a symbol of Japan's past aggression, "From the 18th to the 20th century, European powers together violated Asia," "The Hinomaru is a symbol of Japan's past aggression. Those who call for the "replacement" of "all the flags of the powers" should, if they have the same "conscience", demand the "replacement" of "all the flags of the powers". The "line" of the movement would not make sense without a strong demand for the "replacement" of the "Japanese" flag.

== Others ==
- Member of the Historical Society, the Japanese Society for the History of Ideas, and the Gakushikai.
- 1964, "The Logic of Modern Law and the Fate of Religion" (in "The Fate of God"), received the Kanazawa University Gyotori Prize.
- Hitoshi Takeuchi (The University of Tokyo Professor Emeritus), the founder and chief editor of the scientific magazine "Newton", published a commentary in support of Furuta's theory in "Newton". Newton" September 1989 issue, special feature "Great Feature: The Yamatai Ichibankoku Was in Kyushu! See also. Furuta also contributed to the same magazine. However, in the October 1993 issue of "Newton," the special feature "Thorough Examination of the Yamatai Empire Mystery," the term "Yamatai Empire" is used instead of "Yamatai Ichibankoku," and the issue is devoted to the Yamatai Empire controversy.
- Mineo Nakajima was a student at Matsumoto Fukashi High School. On September 24, 2005 (Heisei 17), a separate organization of supporters, the New Eastern History Society, was established with Nakajima as president.
- Philosopher Muneyoshi Yamada has written books on ancient history based on Furuta's theory, such as "The World of Wei Shiwa Jinten: 邪馬台国と卑弥呼" (Kyoikusha Rekishi Shinsho, 1979).
- Interacts with Member of the House of Councillors, including Eiichi Matsumoto and Sadao Hirano, who are associated with his research area.
- Former TV personality Ryutaro Ueoka is an avid reader and was sometimes mentioned in "Tsurubei Ueoka Papepo TV". He has been a panelist at symposiums presided over by Furuta, and is a close friend of Furuta's in conversation with him.
- A well-known supporter of Furuta's theory is Shunichi Nishimura (former professor at Tokyo Gakugei University and former president of the Japan Society of International Education). Shunichiro Kawabata (economist, professor emeritus at Hokkai School of Commerce) has written in support of Furuta's theory. Michio Morishima (economist, professor emeritus at the University of London) has spoken with Furuta. Hisanosuke Yasukawa (professor emeritus at Nagoya University) also supported Furuta's theory for a while and had an interview with him in 2006. According to Hiroshi Hirayama, in 2007 (Heisei 19), Yasukawa withdrew his support for Furuta's theory (that the first sentence of "Gakumon no Susume" was plagiarized from "Tsugaru soto sangunshi"). Furthermore, Yasukawa officially withdrew his support for Furuta's theory in a list of errata published in a KOKBUNKEN book.。Note that Furuta does not claim plagiarism, but rather citation.
- Furuta's book "There was no 'Yamataikoku'" (Kadokawa bunko edition) includes a review by Sakyo Komatsu, and his book "A Guidepost to the Yamatai Country" includes a dialogue.
- In his book, Furuta expresses his opinion on Akimitsu Takagi's "The Secret of the Yamatai Kingdom. Later, Takagi published a book (refutation) of Furuta's theory.

== See also ==
- Kyushu dynasty theory

== Bibliography ==
- 原田実 (March 25, 2020), 偽書が揺るがせた日本史, 山川出版社, ISBN 9784634151635
