= Toumakoku =

Former country in Japan

Map illustrating the path from the Daifeng commandery to Yamatai, and its distances in the Wajinden.

Toumakoku (投馬国, Toumakoku/Tsumakoku) is one of the countries said to have existed in the Japanese archipelago in the 3rd century.

It is listed in the Wajinden and the ruling official is called a Mimi

According to "Records of Three Kingdoms," Toumakoku was located 20 days by water to the south from Fumi (in Umi, Kasuya District) or Sueranokuni (Karatsu City, Saga Prefecture).

Hata District (central-western part of the Korean Peninsula)).

It may have been the leading power of the Wakoku.

== See also ==
- Wajinden
- Book of Liang
- History of the Northern Dynasties
