= Emperor Kaika =

Legendary emperor of Japan

Emperor Kaika 開化天皇
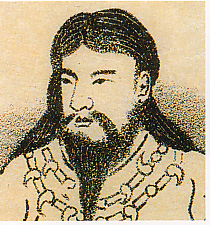

Emperor of Japan
- Reign: 158 BC – 98 BC (traditional)
- Predecessor: Kōgen
- Successor: Sujin
- Born: 208 BC
- Died: 98 BC (aged 110)
- Burial: Kasuga no Izakawa no saka no e no misasagi (春日率川坂上陵) (Nara)
- Spouse: Ikagashikome
- Issue among others...: Emperor Sujin
Posthumous name
- Chinese-style shigō: Emperor Kaika (開化天皇) Japanese-style shigō: Wakayamato-nekohiko-ōbibi no Sumeramikoto (稚日本根子彦大日日天皇)
- House: Imperial House of Japan
- Father: Emperor Kōgen
- Mother: Utsushikome
- Religion: Shinto

Emperor Kaika (Note: The name Kaikwa has also been used.) (開化天皇, Kaika-tennō), also known as Wakayamato Nekohiko Ōbibi no Mikoto (若倭根子日子大毘毘命) in the Kojiki, and Wakayamato Nekohiko Ōbibi no Sumeramikoto (稚日本根子彦大日日天皇) in the Nihon Shoki was the ninth legendary emperor of Japan, according to the traditional order of succession. Very little is known about this Emperor due to a lack of material available for further verification and study. Kaika is known as a "legendary emperor" among historians as his actual existence is disputed. Nothing exists in the Kojiki other than his name and genealogy. Kaika's reign allegedly began in 158 BC. He had one wife and three consorts whom he fathered five children with. After his death in 98 BC, one of his sons supposedly became Emperor Sujin.

== Legendary narrative ==
In the Kojiki and Nihon Shoki, only Kaika's name and genealogy were recorded. The Japanese have traditionally accepted this sovereign's historical existence, and an Imperial misasagi or tomb for Kaika is currently maintained; however, no extant contemporary records have been discovered that confirm a view that this historical figure actually reigned. Kaika was born sometime in 208 BC, and is recorded as being the second son of Emperor Kōgen. His empress mother was named Utsushikome, who was the daughter of Oyakuchisukune. Before he was enthroned sometime in 158 BC, his pre-ascension name was Prince Nikohiko Ō-hibi no Mikoto. The Kojiki records that he ruled from the palace of Sakaihara-no-miya (軽之堺原宮; and in the Nihon Shoki as 軽境原宮) at Karu in what would come to be known as Yamato Province. Emperor Kaika had a chief wife (empress) named Ikagashikome, along with three consorts of which he fathered five children with. Kaika ruled until his death in 98 BC; his second son was then enthroned as the next emperor. His son/heir to the throne was posthumously named Sujin by later generations, and is the first emperor that historians say might have actually existed.

== Known information ==
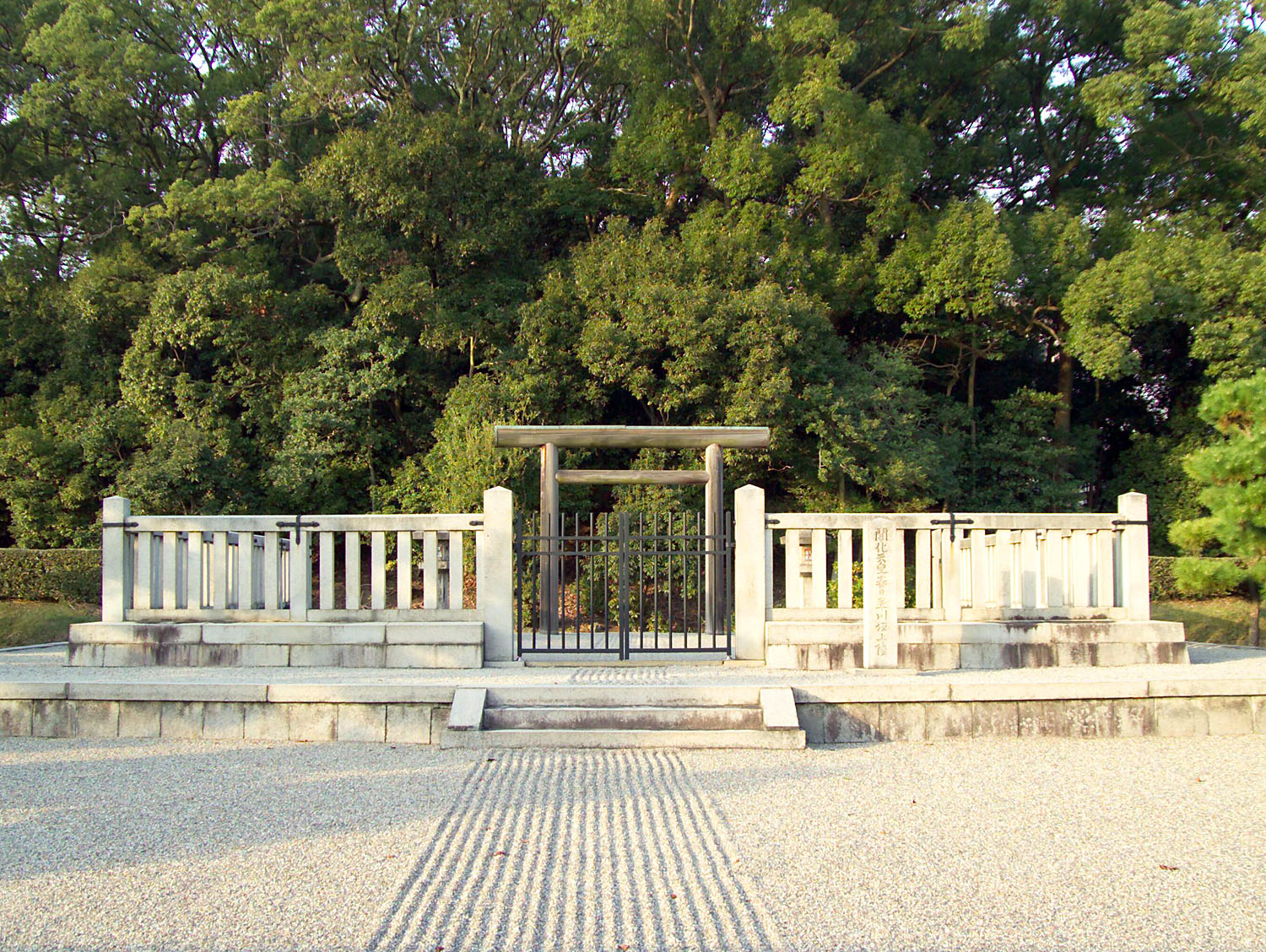
Official tomb of Emperor Kaika in Nara.

The existence of at least the first nine Emperors is disputed due to insufficient material available for further verification and study. Kaika is thus regarded by historians as a "legendary Emperor", and is considered to have been the eighth of eight Emperors without specific legends associated with them. (Note: Also known as the "eight undocumented monarchs" (欠史八代, Kesshi-hachidai)) The name Kaika-tennō was assigned to him posthumously by later generations. His name might have been regularized centuries after the lifetime ascribed to Kaika, possibly during the time in which legends about the origins of the imperial dynasty were compiled as the chronicles known today as the Kojiki. While the actual site of Kaika's grave is not known, the Emperor is traditionally venerated at a memorial Shinto shrine (misasagi) in Nara. The Imperial Household Agency designates this location as Kaika's mausoleum, and its formal name is Kasuga no Izakawa no saka no e no misasagi.

Like Emperor Kōshō and Emperor Kōrei, there is a possibility that "Kaika" could have lived instead in the 1st century (AD). Historian Louis Frédéric notes this idea in his book Japan Encyclopedia where he says "more likely early AD", but this remains disputed among other researchers. The first emperor that historians state might have actually existed is Emperor Sujin, the 10th emperor of Japan. Outside of the Kojiki, the reign of Emperor Kinmei (Note: The 29th Emperor) (c. 509 – 571 AD) is the first for which contemporary historiography is able to assign verifiable dates. The conventionally accepted names and dates of the early Emperors were not confirmed as "traditional" though, until the reign of Emperor Kanmu (Note: Kanmu was the 50th sovereign of the imperial dynasty) between 737 and 806 AD.

== Consorts and children ==
- Empress: Ikagashikome (伊香色謎命), Oohesoki's daughter
  - Prince Mimakiirihikoinie (御間城入彦五十瓊殖尊), later Emperor Sujin
  - Princess Mimatsuhime (御真津比売命)
- Consort: Taniwanotakano-hime (丹波竹野媛), Taniwa no Ooagatanushi Yugori's daughter
  - Prince Hikoyumusu (彦湯産隅命)
- Consort: Hahatsu-hime (姥津媛), Prince Waninishisaihito's daughter
  - Prince Hikoimasu (彦坐王)
- Consort: Washi-hime (鸇比売), Katsuragi no Tarumi no Sukune's daughter
  - Prince Taketoyohazurawake (建豊波豆羅和気王)

== See also ==
- Emperor of Japan
- List of Emperors of Japan
- Imperial cult

== Notes ==
Regnal titles
Preceded by Emperor Kōgen	Legendary Emperor of Japan; 158 BC – 98 BC	Succeeded by Emperor Sujin
