= Kibitsu Shrine (Bingo) =

Shinto shrine in Fukuyama, Japan

Kibitsu Shrine 吉備津神社
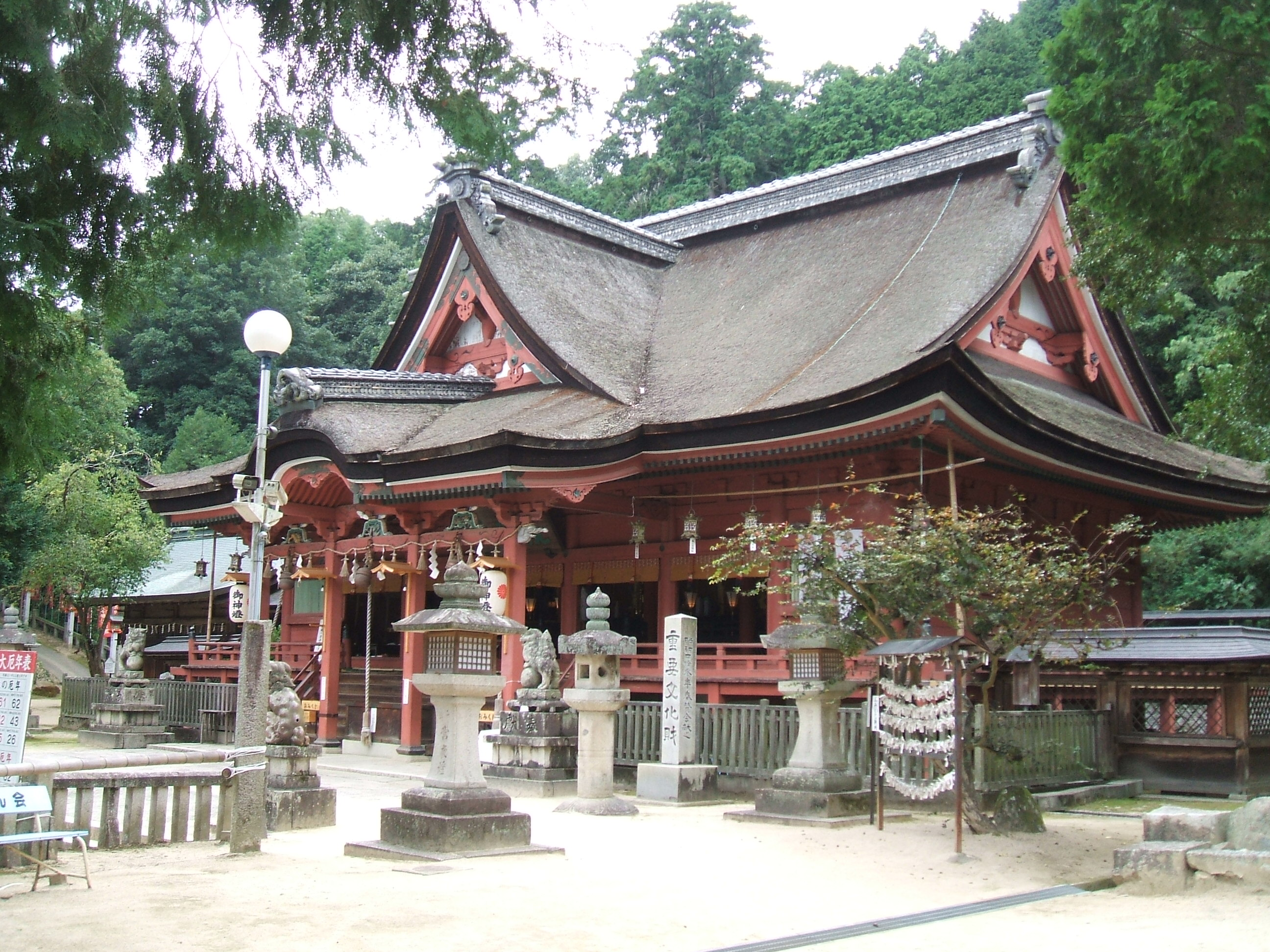
- Honden of Kibitsu Shrine

- Kibitsu Shrine Kibitsu Shrine (Bingo) (Japan)

Religion
- Affiliation: Shinto
- Deity: Kibitsuhiko-no-mikoto
- Festival: November 23
- Type: Kibitsu

Location
- Location: 400 Miyauchi, Shin'ichi-chō, Fukuyama-shi, Hiroshima-ken 729-3104
- Interactive map of Kibitsu Shrine 吉備津神社
- Coordinates: 34°34′9.61″N 133°16′15.85″E

Website
- Official website

Kibitsu Shrine (吉備津神社) is a Shinto shrine in the Shin'ichi-chō neighborhood of the city of Fukuyama in Hiroshima Prefecture, Japan. It is the ichinomiya of former Bingo Province. The main festival of the shrine is held annually on November 23.

== Enshrined kami ==
The kami enshrined at Kibitsu Jinja are:

- Kibitsuhiko-no-mikoto (吉備津彦命), son of Emperor Kōrei, conqueror of the Kingdom of Kibi
- Ōyamato Nekohikofuto-no-mikoto (大日本根子彦太瓊命), Emperor Kōrei
- Kuwashi-hime (細比売命), empress of Emperor Kōrei.
- Wakatake-hiko-no-mikoto (稚武彦命), younger brother of Kibitsuhiko

== History ==
The origins of Kibitsu Jinja are uncertain. The shrine claims that when Kibi Province was divided into three provinces in 806, it was established as a bunrei from the original Kibitsu Shrine in Okayama. However, there is no documentary evidence to support this, and the shrine does not appear in the Engishiki, which was complied between 905 and 967 AD. The first time the shrine is mentioned in a historical source is in 1148 in which the name is mentioned in the records of Yasaka Shrine, and archaeological excavations on the grounds have found not artifacts earlier than the 12th century. However, from the Kamakura period, it was regarded as the ichinomiya of the province, and had a large number of estates, with which it often clashed with secular authorities.

During the Nanboku-cho period, the shrine is the location where Imperial loyalist Sakurayama Koretoshi (桜山茲俊) raised an army in 1331 in support of the Southern Court. However, as detailed in the Taiheiki, after receiving a false report that Kusunoki Masashige had been defeated at Akasaka Castle, he committed suicide with his wife and children and burned the shrine down. This event led to the area around the shrine to be designated as a National Historic Site in 1934.

Kō no Moroyasu issued a decree in 1346 ordering the Bingo shugo to stop harassing the shrine. During the Sengoku period, the shrine was supported by Mōri Terumoto, and in the Edo Period it was supported by the Fukushima clan and the Mizuno clan who were daimyō of Fukuyama Domain. After the Meiji Restoration, it was listed as a National Shrine, 3rd rank (国幣小社, Kokuhei Shosha) in 1871.

The shrine is located a twenty-minute walk from Shin-ichi Station on the JR West Fukuen Line.

== Cultural properties ==
=== National Important Cultural Properties ===
- Honden (本殿), Edo Period (1648); donation by Mizuno Katsushige. It is a seven-by-four bay hall in the relatively large and has a flat "Yomazukuri" style which is common in the Bingo and Aki regions
- Wooden statues of Komainu (木造狛犬), , Heian period, group of three with height of 78, 80 and 82 centimeters. As Komainu come in sets of two, one is missing. The statues are now kept at the Tokyo National Museum.
- Tachi (毛抜形太刀), Tachi, Sengoku period. Set of four. In 1972, the sword fittings were stolen and their whereabouts are unknown. The blades are currently deposited at the Okayama Prefectural Museum.

=== Hiroshima Prefecture Designated Tangible Cultural Properties ===
- Kagura-den (神楽殿), Edo Period (1673);
- Copper & tin shakujō staff head (銅製錫杖頭), Muromachi Period (1469); A circular ring is attached to the top of the handle, with arc-shaped protrusions on both shoulders of the ring and on the diagonal rings. A five-ringed stupa is cast into the top of the ring, and on the line within the ring that connects the stupa to the handle, a pagoda with flower vases on either side is cast. As with a normal shakujō, six small rings representing the six realms of Buddhism remain intact, three on each side.

== Gallery ==
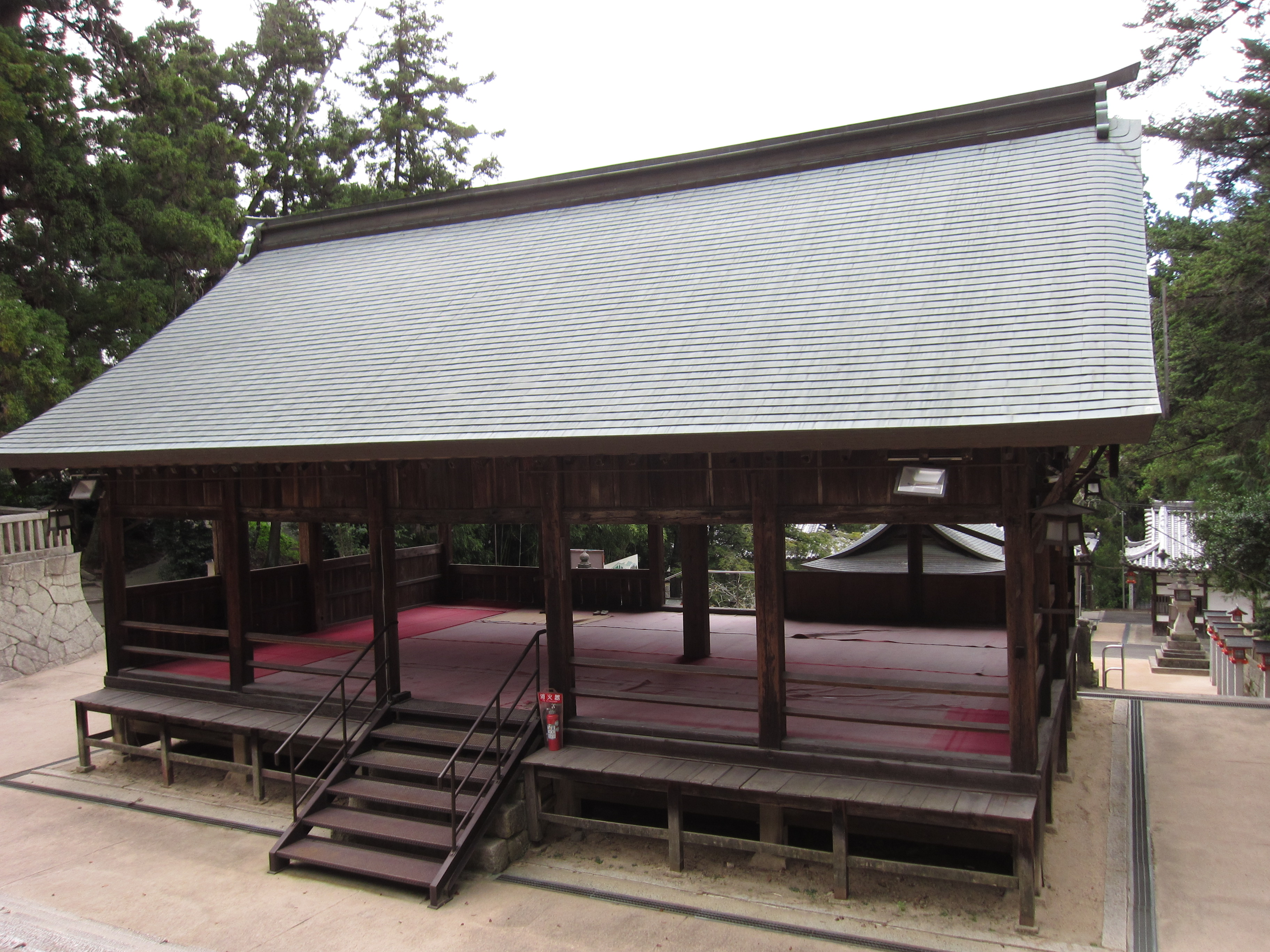
Haiden（Fukuyama city ICP）

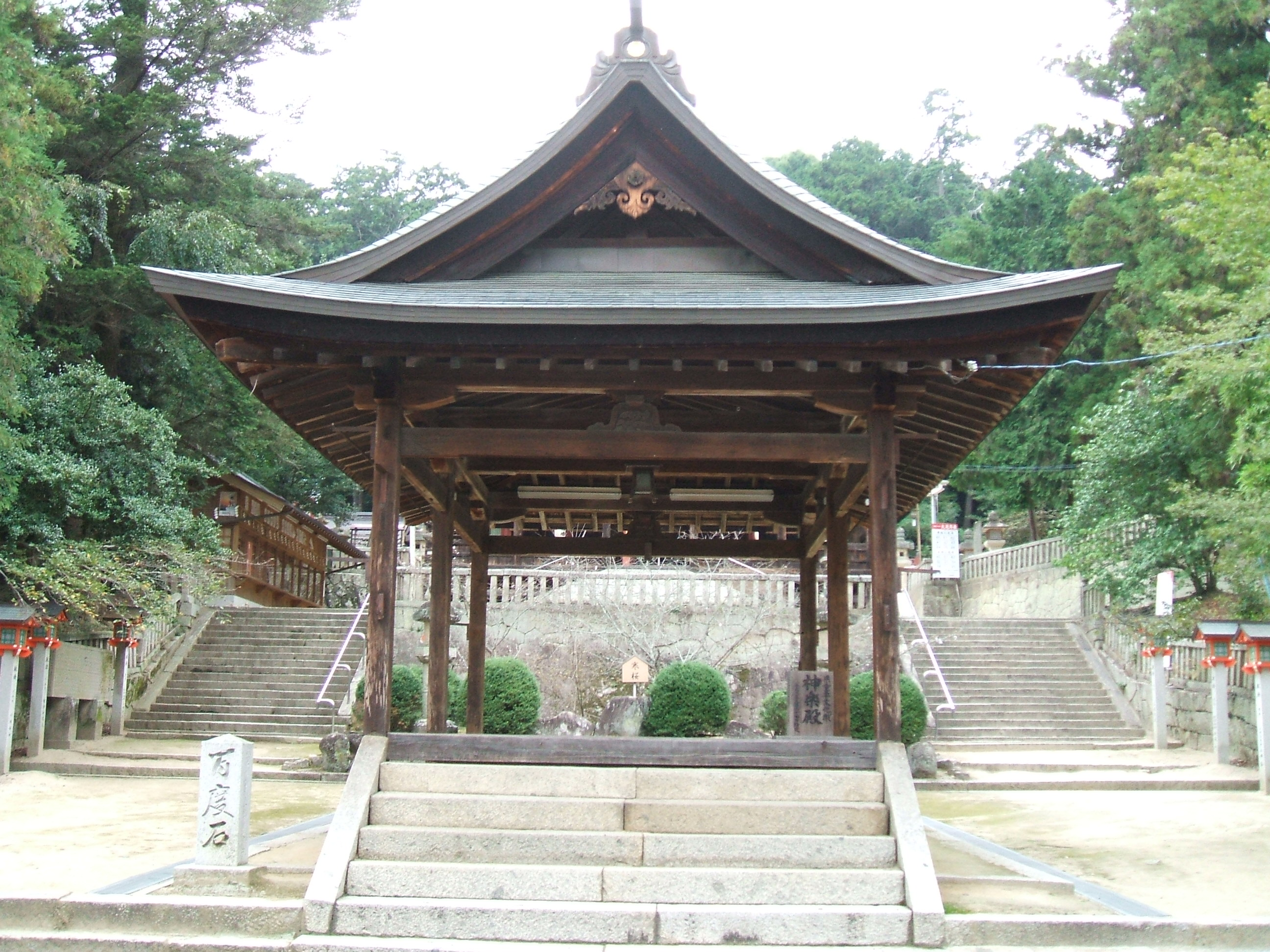
Kagura-den（Hiroshima Prefecture ICP）

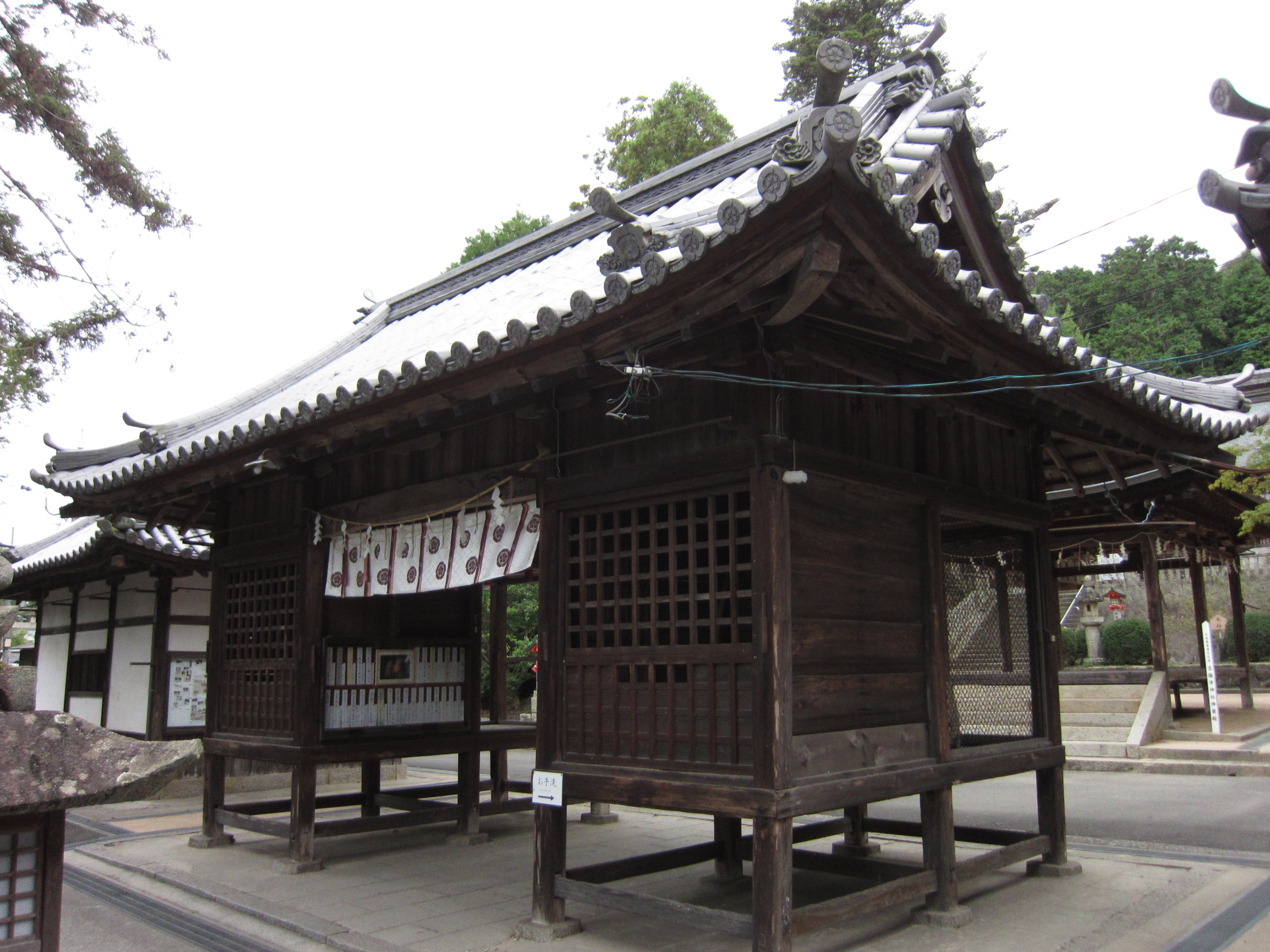
Upper Gate

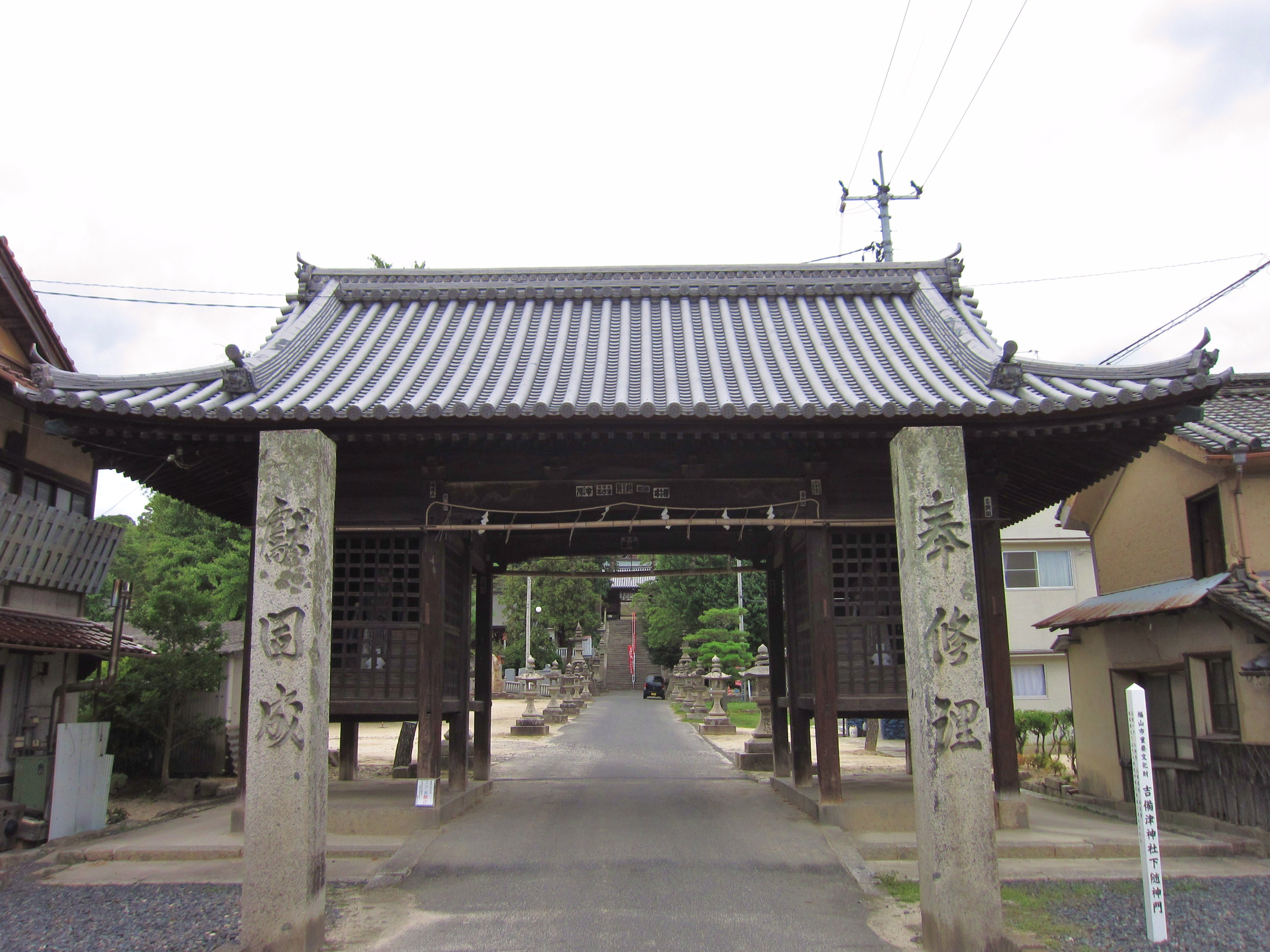
Lower Gate（Fukuyama city ICP）

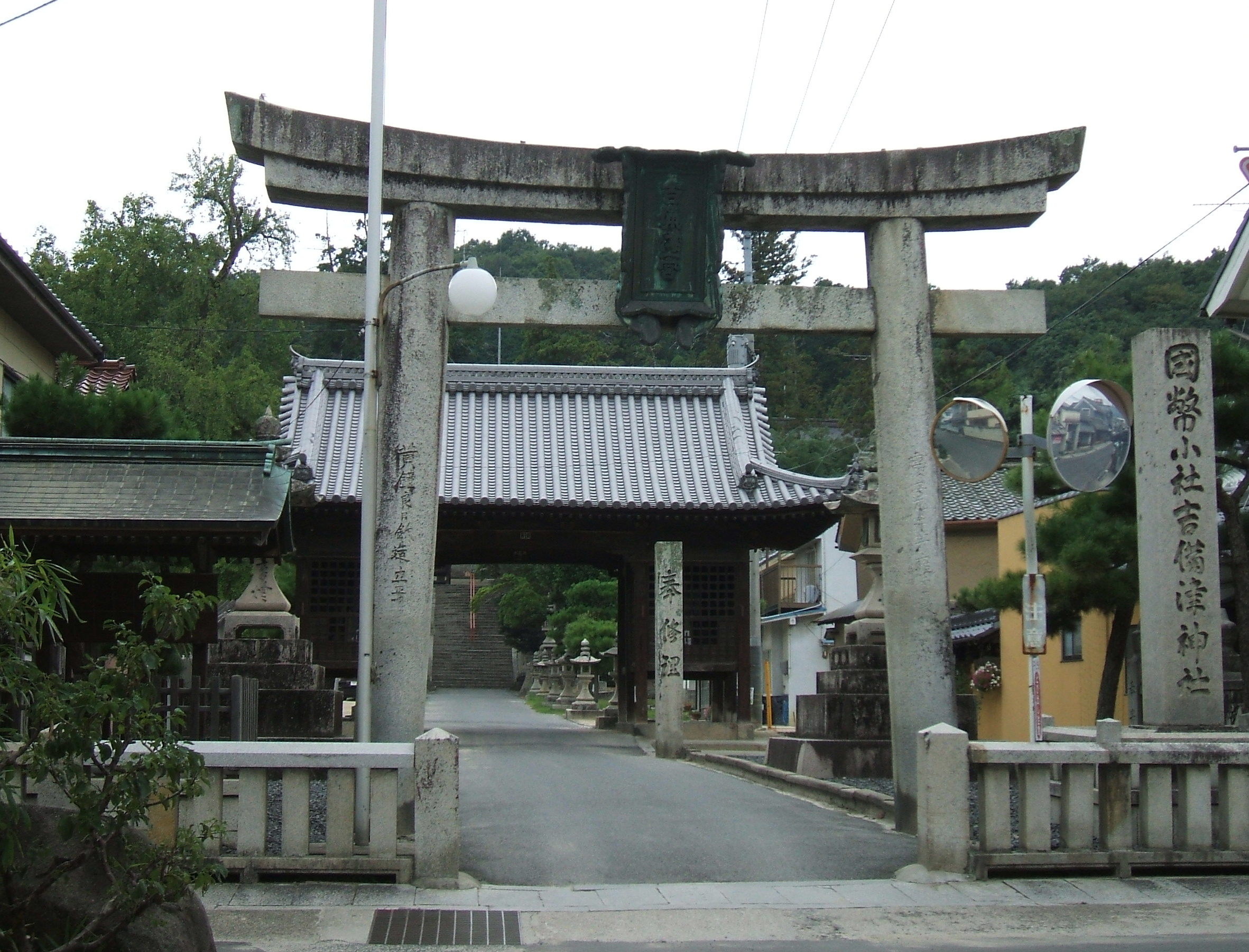
Great Toriii（Fukuyama city ICP）

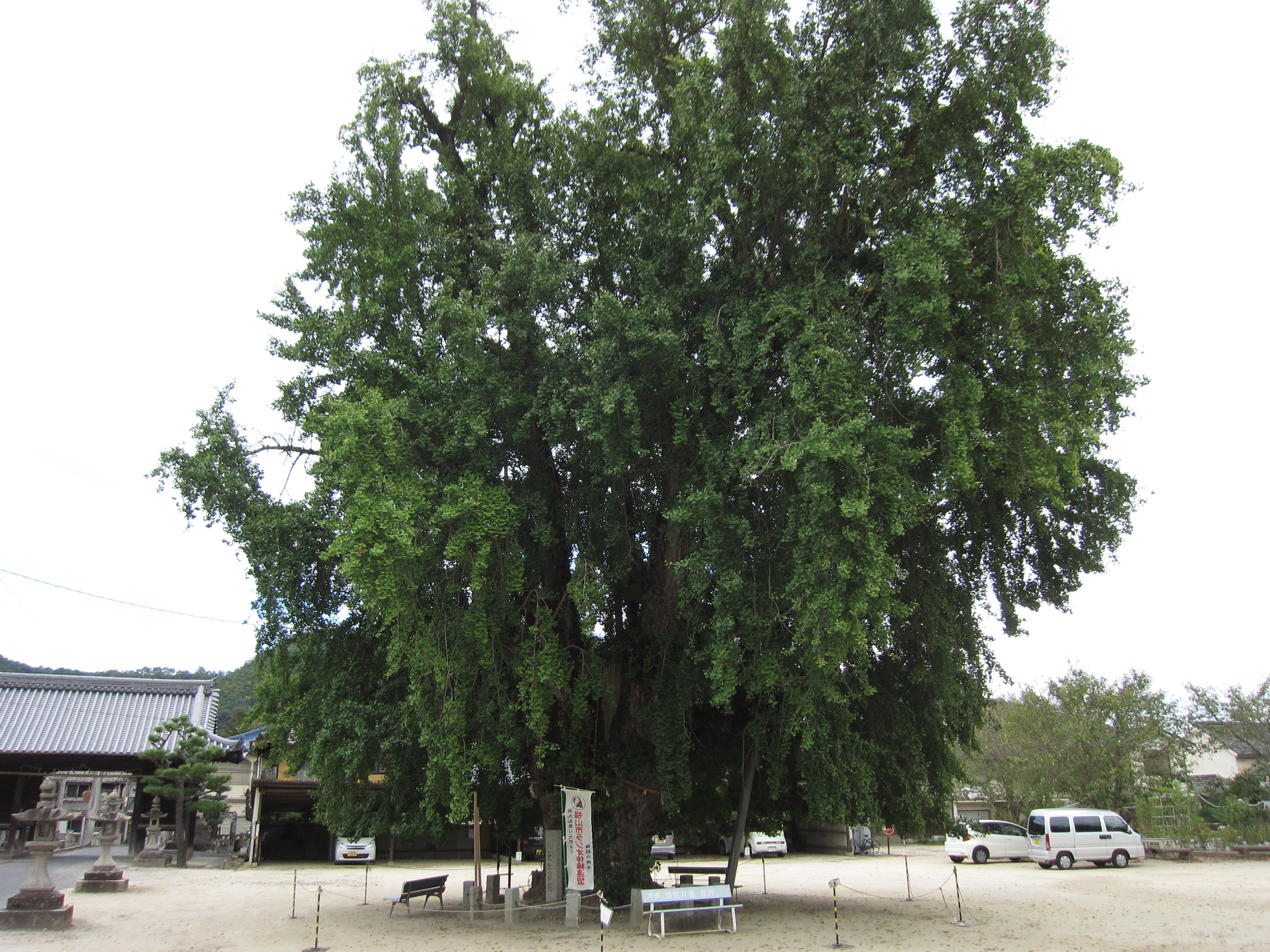
Ginkgo tree

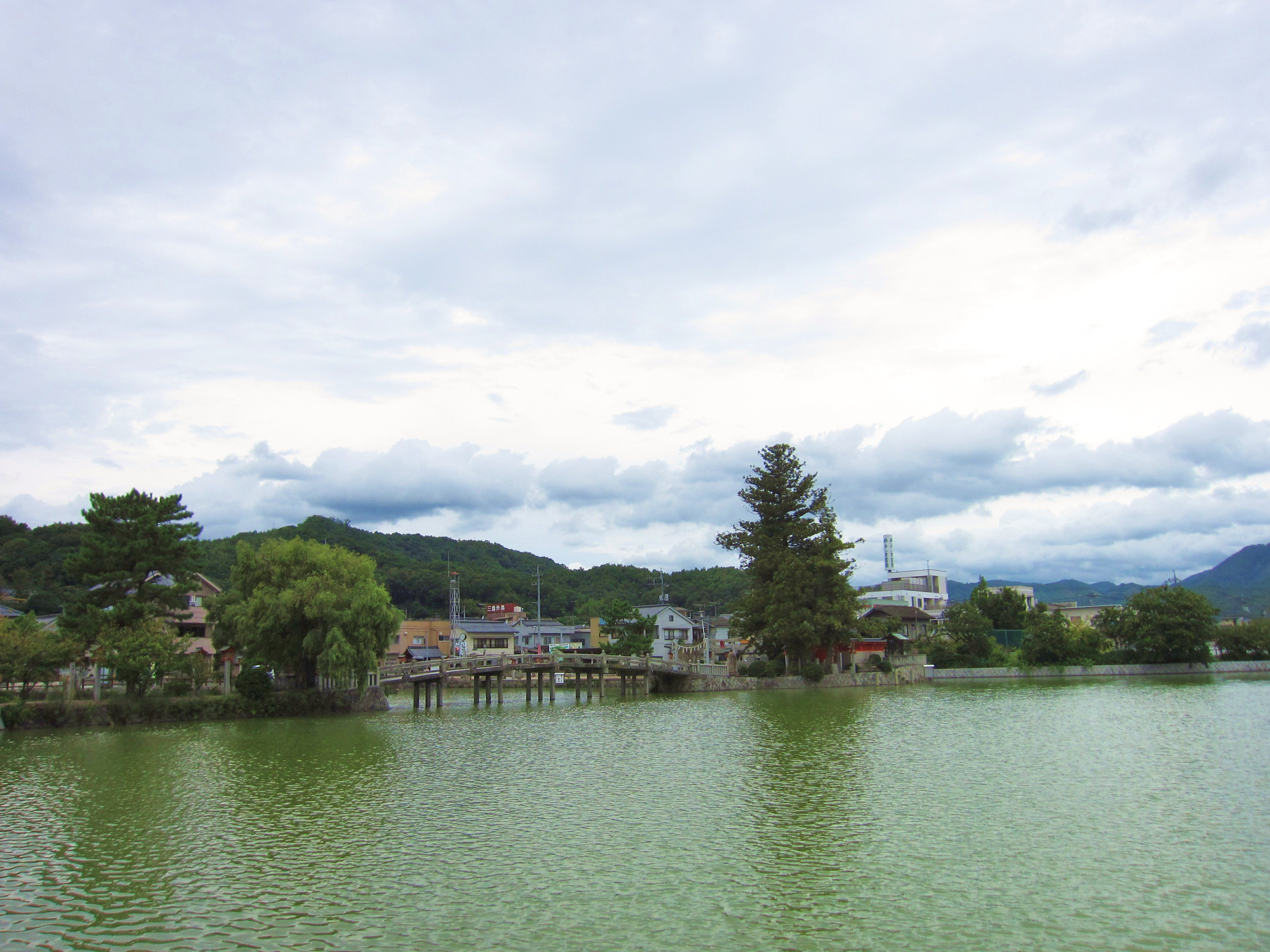
Pond

== See also ==
- Ichinomiya
- List of Historic Sites of Japan (Hiroshima)
