= Prince Ōhiko =

Mythical Japanese prince and war lord

Prince Ōhiko 大彦命
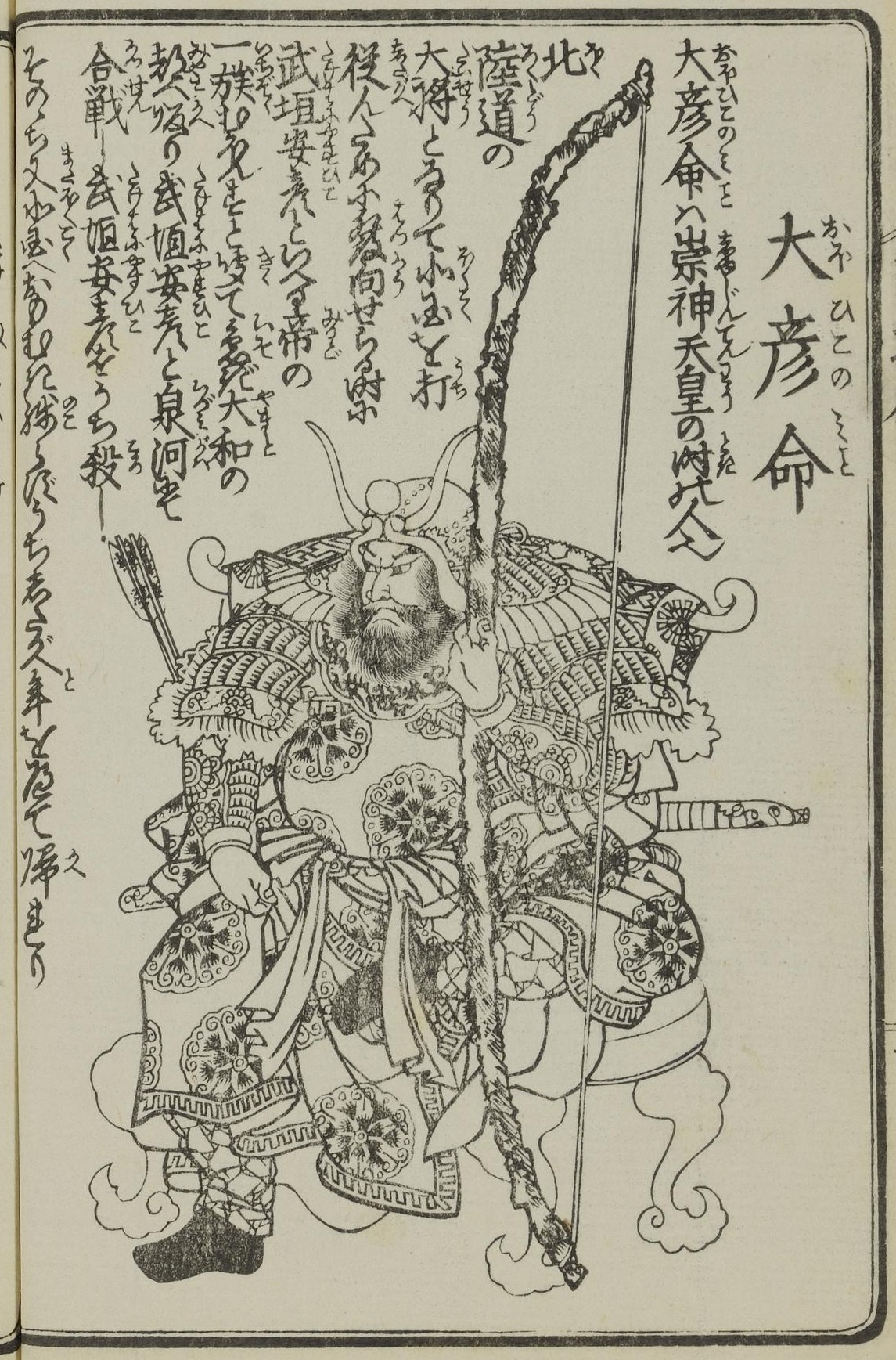

Shidō Shōgun
- Shidō Shōgun with: Takenumakahawake, Kibitsuhiko-no-mikoto, and Tanba Michinushi no Mikoto
- Issue: Mimaki-hime; Takenumakahawake
- House: Imperial House of Japan
- Father: Emperor Kōgen
- Mother: Utsushikome

Prince Ōhiko (大彦命) was a legendary Japanese general, Shidō Shōgun (simultaneously with Takenumakahawake, Kibitsuhiko-no-mikoto, and Tanba Michinushi no Mikoto), and father of the empress consort Mimaki-hime. His father was Emperor Kōgen, and his mother was the empress consort Utsushikome.

== Life ==
Prince Ōhiko came to prominence when he was sent to subjugate northern tribes. In the Nihon-Shoki it says he was sent north, but the Kojiki specifies Koshi Province. One day he heard a girl singing. As he came closer to the girl, he asked her what her song meant. However the girl vanished, and Ōhiko made haste to report to the emperor.

== In the Nihon-Shoki ==
In the Nihon-Shoki, the Emperor's sister, Princess Yamato Totohi Momoso, is called. When she arrives, she is able to decipher the message in the girl’s song, and correctly deduces that Takehaniyasuhiko-no-Mikoto, a half brother of Prince Ōhiko, and his wife, Atahime, will start a rebellion. Soon after this prediction comes true, and Takehaniyasuhiko-no-Mikoto's army, along with his wife Atahime's army, arrive from opposite directions. Kibitsuhiko-no-mikoto intercepts Atahime's army, and Atahime is killed. Takehaniyasuhiko-no-Mikoto flees to Yamashiro Province, and Prince Ōhiko follows him. Catching up with him, the two fight. Takehaniyasuhiko-no-Mikoto strikes first, but misses, and Prince Ōhiko wins the fight. Upon the end of the war, the Emperor sends Ōhiko to fight "savage tribes abroad".

== In the Kojiki ==
In the Kojiki, the Emperor figures out the message of the song himself. This time, Ōhiko goes to Yamashiro Province straight away, where he sees Takehaniyasuhiko-no-Mikoto waiting for him. Takehaniyasuhiko-no-Mikoto once again strikes first but misses, and Ōhiko kills Takehaniyasuhiko-no-Mikoto. Takehaniyasuhiko-no-Mikoto's army flees but Ōhiko's army follows them, and massacres Takehaniyasuhiko-no-Mikoto's army. He returns back to the Emperor and reports the victory. There is no mention of Takehaniyasuhiko-no-Mikoto's wife.

== Inariyama Sword ==
The Inariyama Sword was a sword found in the tomb of a man named "Wowake". Inscribed on the swords genealogy section is the name "Öpö piko", and this has been theorised to be Prince Ōhiko. However, some historians are wary about this assertion. A professor in the Tokyo Metropolitan University said that Wowake probably only sought to make Prince Ōhiko an ancestor of his after hearing the myth, which would have been known at the time.

== Worship ==
Prince Ōhiko is enshrined in the Koshiō Shrine, Isasumi Shrine, Usaka Shrine, Funatsu Shrine, Aekuni Shrine, and Fuse Shrine (Sanuki City).
