= Emperor Sujin =

Legendary emperor of Japan

Emperor Sujin 崇神天皇
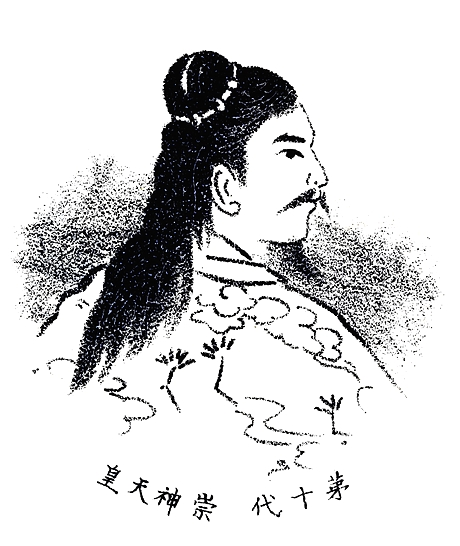

Emperor of Japan
- Reign: 97 BC – 30 BC (traditional)
- Predecessor: Kaika
- Successor: Suinin
- Born: Mimaki (御間城尊); 148 BC
- Died: 30 BC (aged 118)
- Burial: Yamanobe no michi no Magari no oka no e no misasagi (山邊道勾岡上陵) (Nara)
- Spouse: Mimaki-hime (and two other consorts)
- Issue among others...: Emperor Suinin; Toyosukiirihime
Posthumous name
- Chinese-style shigō: Emperor Sujin (崇神天皇) Japanese-style shigō: Mimakiiribikoinie no Sumeramikoto (御間城入彦五十瓊殖天皇)
- House: Imperial House of Japan
- Father: Emperor Kaika
- Mother: Ikagashikome (Note: There are two ways this name is transcribed: "Ika-gashiko-me" is used by Tsutomu Ujiya, while "Ika-shiko-me" is used by William George Aston.)
- Religion: Shinto

Emperor Sujin (崇神天皇, Sujin-tennō), also known as Mimakiirihikoinie no Mikoto (御眞木入日子印恵命) in the Kojiki, and Mimakiiribikoinie no Sumeramikoto (御間城入彦五十瓊殖天皇) or Hatsukunishirasu Sumeramikoto (御肇國天皇) in the Nihon Shoki was the tenth Emperor of Japan. While Sujin is the first emperor whose existence historians widely accept, he is still referred to as a "legendary emperor" due to a lack of information available and because dates for his reign vary. Both the Kojiki, and the Nihon Shoki (collectively known as the Kiki) record events that took place during Sujin's alleged lifetime. This legendary narrative tells how he set up a new shrine outside of the Imperial palace to enshrine Amaterasu. He is also credited with initiating the worship of Ōmononushi (equated with the deity of Mount Miwa), and expanding his empire by sending generals to four regions of Japan in what became known as the legend of Shidō shogun.

This Emperor's reign is conventionally assigned the years of 97 BC – 30 BC. During his alleged lifetime, he fathered twelve children with a chief wife (empress) and two consorts. Sujin chose his future heir based on dreams two of his sons had; in this case, his younger son became Emperor Suinin upon Sujin's death in 30 BC. Like other emperors of this period, the location of Sujin's grave if it exists is unknown. He is traditionally venerated at the Andonyama kofun in Tenri, Nara.

== Legendary narrative ==
The Japanese have traditionally accepted this sovereign's historical existence, and a kofun (tumulus) for Sujin is currently maintained. There remains no conclusive evidence though that supports this historical figure actually reigning. The following information available is taken from the pseudo-historical Kojiki and Nihon Shoki, which are collectively known as Kiki (記紀) or Japanese chronicles. These chronicles include legends and myths, as well as potential historical facts that have since been exaggerated and/or distorted over time. The records state that Sujin was born sometime in 148 BC, and was the second son of Emperor Kaika. Sujin's mother was Ikagashikome no Mikoto, who was also a concubine of Sujin's grandfather Emperor Kōgen. (Note: Ikagashikome (Ika-shiko-me) became Emperor Kaika's empress, but before that she had been a concubine to the previous Emperor (Kōgen). It is recorded that she bore a child with Kōgen, which makes this problematic as in order to be Sujin's mother she would have had to give birth again separated by a 50-year gap. Given her recorded age at the time, this scenario seems highly unlikely.) Before he was enthroned sometime in 97 BC, his pre-ascension name was either Prince Mimakiirihikoinie no Mikoto, Mimakiiribikoinie no Sumeramikoto, or Hatsukunishirasu Sumeramikoto. The former name is used in the Kojiki, while the latter two are found in the Nihon Shoki. Sujin was enthroned sometime in 97 BC, and during the 3rd year of his reign it is the recorded that he moved the capital to Shiki (磯城), naming it the Palace of Mizu-gaki or Mizugaki-no-miya (瑞籬宮). (Note: Historian Tsutomu Ujiya states that the location could have been in the vicinity of Kanaya (金屋), Sakurai, Nara)

=== Enshrining Ōmononushi (Miwa Myōjin) ===
The Kiki records that pestilence struck during the 5th year of Sujin's rule, killing half the Japanese population. The following year peasants abandoned their fields and rebellion became rampant. To help relieve the suffering of his people, the Emperor turned his attention towards the gods. At the time, both the sun goddess Amaterasu and the god Yamato-no-Okunitama (倭大国魂神) were enshrined at the Imperial Residence. Sujin became overwhelmed with having to cohabit with these two powerful deities and set up separate enshrinements to house them. Amaterasu was moved to Kasanui village (笠縫邑) in Yamato Province (Nara), where a Himorogi altar was built out of solid stone. Sujin placed his daughter Toyosukiiri-hime (豊鍬入姫命) in charge of the new shrine, and she would become the first Saiō. Yamato-no-Okunitama (the other god) was entrusted to another daughter named Nunakiirihime, but her health began to fail shortly afterward. It is recorded that Nunakiiri-hime became emaciated after losing all of her hair, which rendered her unable to perform her duties. These events still did not alleviate the ongoing plague sweeping the empire, so Sujin decreed a divination to be performed sometime during the 7th year of his reign. The divination involved him making a trip to the plain of Kami-asaji or Kamu-asaji-ga-hara (神浅茅原), and invoking the eight hundred myriad deities.

Sujin's aunt Yamatototohimomoso-hime (倭迹迹日百襲媛命) (daughter of 7th Emperor Emperor Kōrei) acted as a miko, and was possessed by a god who identified himself as Ōmononushi. This god claimed responsibility for the plague, announcing that it would not stop until he was venerated. Although the Emperor propitiated to the god, the effects were not immediate. Sujin was later given guidance in the form of a dream to seek out a man named Ōtataneko (太田田根子) and appoint him as head priest. When he was found and installed, the pestilence eventually subsided, allowing five cereal crops to ripen. Out of an abundance of caution, the Emperor also appointed Ikagashikoo (伊香色雄) as kami-no-mono-akatsu-hito (神班物者), or one who sorts the offerings to the gods. To this day the Miwa sect of the Kamo clan claim to be descents from Ōtataneko, while Ikagashikoo was a claimed ancestor of the now extinct Mononobe clan.

=== Four Cardinal Quarters (Shidō shogun) ===
The Four Cardinal Quarters

In his 10th year of rule, Sujin instituted four of his Generals to the Four Cardinal Quarters in what would be known as the Shidō shogun. These areas (west, north/northwest, northeast, and east) were all centered around the capital in Yamato Province. Sujin instructed his generals (shogun) to quell those who would not submit to their rule. One of the four shoguns who had been sent to the northern region was named Ōhiko (大彦), who was also Emperor Kōgen's first son. One day a certain maiden approached Ōhiko and sang him a cryptic song, only to disappear afterwards. Sujin's aunt Yamatototohimomoso-hime (倭迹迹日百襲媛命), who was skilled at clairvoyance, interpreted this to mean that Take-hani-yasu-hiko (Ōhiko's half brother) was plotting an insurrection. Yamatototohimomoso-hime pieced it together from overhearing news that Take-hani-yasu-hiko's wife (Ata-bime) came to Mount Amanokaguya (天香久山), and took a clump of earth in the corner of her neckerchief. (Note: Mount Amanokaguya is located in Kashihara, Nara.)

Emperor Sujin gathered his generals in a meeting upon hearing the news, but the couple had already mustered troops to the west who were ready to attack the capital. The Emperor responded by sending an army under the command of general Isaseri-hiko no Mikoto to fight a battle that ended with a decisive Imperial victory. Ata-bime was killed in combat, and her husband fled back north. Sujin then sent general Hiko-kuni-fuku (彦国葺命) north to Yamashiro Province to punish the rebel prince. There was ultimately an exchange of bowshots that resulted in Take-hani-yasu-hiko's death by an arrow through the chest. Eventually the Emperor would appoint 137 governors for the provinces under his Imperial rule as the empire expanded. In his 12th year of rule, the Emperor decreed that a census be taken of the populace "with grades of seniority, and the order of forced labour". The tax system meanwhile was set up so taxes imposed were in the form of mandatory labor. These taxes were known as yuhazu no mitsugi (弭調; "bow-end tax") for men and tanasue no mitsugi (手末調; "finger-end tax") for women. During this period peace and prosperity ensued, and the Emperor received the title Hatsu kuni shirasu sumeramikoto (御肇国天皇; "The Emperor, the august founder of the country").

=== Choosing an heir and Divine treasures ===
During the 48th year of Sujin's reign (50 BC), he summoned two of his sons saying that he loved them equally and could not make up his mind which to make his heir. He then asked his sons to describe the dreams they had recently, so he could divine their lot by interpreting them. The elder son's name was Toyoki (豊城命), and explained to his father that he dreamt of climbing Mt. Mimoro (Mount Miwa). While facing east, he said that he thrust his spear eight times and then waved his sword eight times skywards. The younger prince, whose name was Ikume (活目命) dreamt of climbing Mimoro and spanning ropes on four sides. He went on to say how he chased the sparrows that ate the millet. Sujin accordingly chose his younger son Ikume to become the next Crown prince, while his older son Toyoki was chosen to govern the east. Toyoki ultimately became the ancestor of the Kamitsuke and Shimotsuke clans.

In the 60th year of Sujin's reign (38 BC), Sujin told his ministers that he wanted to look at divine treasures brought from the heavens by Takehinateru (建比良鳥命) which were housed in the Izumo Shrine. Izumo Furune (出雲振根) was the keeper of the treasures, but at the time was away on business in Tsukushi Province. Furune's younger brother Izumo Iiirine (出雲飯入根), accommodated the Imperial Edict on his behalf by sending his two younger brothers as carriers of these treasures to show the Emperor. When Furune returned, he was furious at Iiirine for parting with the treasures. He invited his younger brother to wade in a pool (named Yamuya) with him, where he used a sword-swapping intrigue. Furune exchanged his own wooden sword with his brother's real sword and commenced a battle which ended with Iiirine's death. When the Imperial court received news of the event, they dispatched two generals (Note: Takenunakawawake (武渟川別) (General of the East), and Kibitsuhiko (吉備津彦命) (General of the West)) to slay Izumo Furune.

=== Later reign and death ===
Towards the end of his reign in (36 BC), both the Kojiki and Nihon Shoki records indicate that Sujin started to encourage the building of artificial ponds and canals. During this time, Yosami pond (依網池) was built near Ōyosami Shrine (大依羅神社) in Sumiyoshi-ku, Osaka. (Note: Yosami pond could have also been slightly south in the Ikeuchi area of Sakai, Osaka.) Sujin is also credited with building Sakaori pond (酒折池) which was said to be located in Karu (Kashihara, Nara). During his alleged lifetime, Sujin fathered twelve children with a chief wife (empress) and two consorts. When he died in 30 BC, his son Prince Ikumeirihikoisachi became the next emperor per Sujin's choice. Sujin's actual burial site is unknown, but is said to be at Mount Miwa.

== Historical figure ==
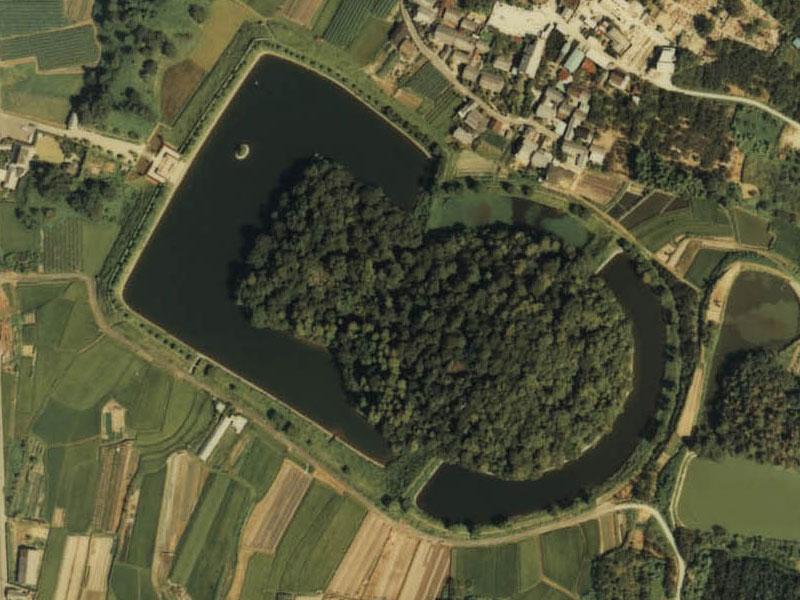
Andonyama kofun (alleged burial site of the Emperor)

While Emperor Sujin is the first emperor whom historians state might have actually existed, he is not confirmed as an actual historical figure. Like his predecessors, his reign is disputed due to insufficient material available for further verification and study. Sujin's possible lifespan has been suggested to be as early as the 1st century AD, to as late as the fourth century AD, this is well past his conventionally assigned reign of 97 BC – 30 BC. Like Emperor Kōshō, Emperor Kōrei, and Emperor Kaika, historian Louis Frédéric notes an idea in his book Japan Encyclopedia that Sujin could have lived in the 1st century (AD). This remains disputed though, especially among researchers who have been critical of his book. If Sujin did in fact exist, then he may have been the founder of the imperial dynasty. Historian Richard Ponsonby-Fane suggests that Sujin may have been the first emperor to perform a census and establish and regularize a system of taxation.

In either case (fictional or not), the name Sujin-tennō was assigned to him posthumously by later generations. His name might have been regularized centuries after the lifetime ascribed to Sujin, possibly during the time in which legends about the origins of the imperial dynasty were compiled as the chronicles known today as the Kojiki. Sujin's longevity was also written down by later compilers, who may have unrealistically extended his age to fill in time gaps. While the actual site of Sujin's grave is not known, the Emperor is traditionally venerated at the Andonyama kofun in Tenri, Nara. The Imperial Household Agency designates this location as the kofun (tumulus), and its formal name is ''Yamanobe no michi no Magari no oka no e no misasagi. Sujin's kofun is one of six that are present in the area; the mounds are thought to have built sometime between 250 and 350 AD.

Outside of the Kojiki, the reign of Emperor Kinmei (Note: The 29th Emperor) (c. 509 – 571 AD) is the first for which contemporary historiography is able to assign verifiable dates. The conventionally accepted names and dates of the early Emperors were not confirmed as "traditional" though, until the reign of Emperor Kanmu (Note: Kanmu was the 50th sovereign of the imperial dynasty) between 737 and 806 AD. The lineal ancestor of the current reigning emperor can be traced back to Emperor Kōkaku, who lived a thousand years later.

== Consorts and children ==
Empress: Mimaki-hime (御間城姫), Prince Ōhiko's daughter

- Third Son: Prince Ikumeirihikoisachi (活目入彦五十狭茅尊), later Emperor Suinin
- Prince Hikoisachi (彦五十狭茅命)
- Princess Kunikata-hime (国方姫命)
- Princess Chichitsukuyamato-hime (千千衝倭姫命)
- Prince Yamatohiko (倭彦命; d.57 BC)
- Princess Ika-hime (伊賀比売命)

Consort: Tootsuayumemaguwashi-hime (遠津年魚眼眼妙媛), Kii no Arakahatobe's daughter

- Prince Toyokiirihiko (豊城入彦命) (Note: The kami of Suijin's son, Toyoki-iri-hiko no mikoto, is venerated at Futarayama jinja in Utsunomiya, Shimotsuke Province.) ancestor of Keno Clan (毛野君)
- Princess Toyosukiirihime (豊鍬入姫命), first Saiō

Consort: Owari-no-ōama-hime (尾張大海媛), Prince Tatehiroshinabi's daughter

- Prince Ōiriki (大入杵命), ancestor of Noto no kuni no Miyatsuko (能登国造)
- Prince Yasakairihiko (八坂入彦命)
- Princess Nunakiirihime (渟名城入媛命)
- Princess Toochiniirihime (十市瓊入媛命)

== See also ==
- Emperor of Japan
- List of Emperors of Japan
- Imperial cult

== Notes ==
Regnal titles
Preceded by Emperor Kaika	Legendary Emperor of Japan; 97 BC – 30 BC (traditional dates)	Succeeded by Emperor Suinin
