= Aekuni Shrine =

Shinto shrine in Iga, Mie, Japan

Aekuni Shrine 敢國神社
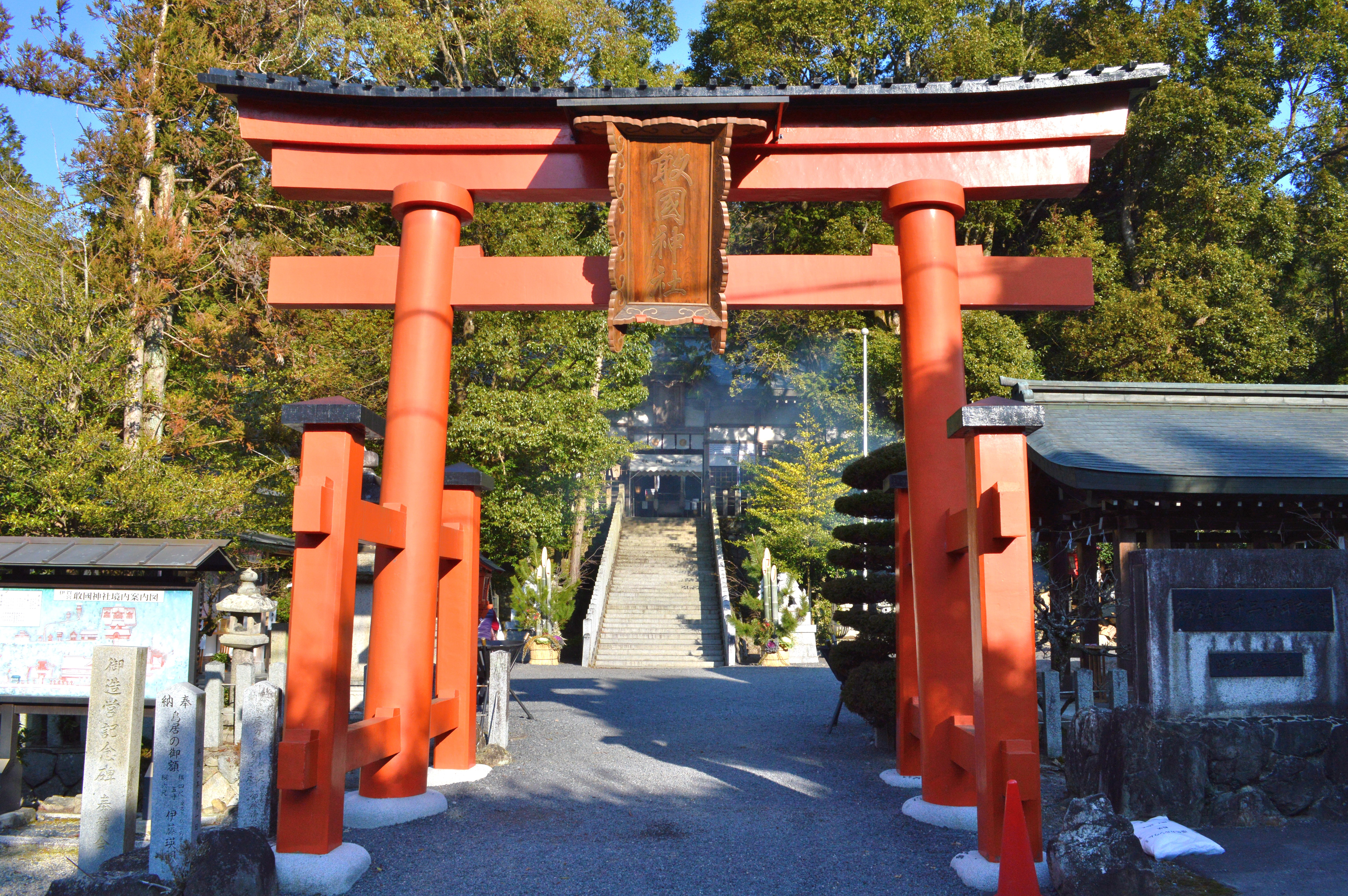
- The torii entrance to the shrine

- Aekuni Shrine Aekuni Shrine (Japan)

Religion
- Affiliation: Shinto
- Deity: Prince Ōhiko
- Festival: December 5

Location
- Location: Ichinomiya 877, Iga-shi, Mie-ken 518-0003
- Interactive map of Aekuni Shrine 敢國神社
- Coordinates: 34.787367°N 136.163939°E

Architecture
- Founder: Empress Kōgyoku
- Established: 658 AD

Website
- Official website

Aekuni Shrine (敢國神社, Aekuni-jinja) is a Shinto shrine located in the city of Iga, Mie Prefecture, Japan. It is the Ichinomiya of the former Iga Province and claims to have been founded in the seventh century. It is classified as a Beppo Shrine by the Association of Shinto Shrines.

== Enshrined kami ==
The kami enshrined at Aekuni Jinja are:

- Prince Ōhiko (大彦命), son Emperor Kōgen, deployed to Hokurikudo as one of the Shido Shogun.
- Sukunabikona (少彦名命), kami of agriculture, healing, magic, brewing sake and knowledge
- Kanayamahiko (金山比咩命), kami from the Nangū Taisha

=== About the Kami ===
According to the Engishiki, there used to be only one deity enshrined at Aekuni Shrine. According to the Rikkokushi, the name of this deity was Aekuni-tsu-kami (敢国津神). This deity ruled over the entire region, together with the Abe clan's patron god, with Mt. Nangu being their place of worship.

During the Muromachi Period, a theory arose that Kanayamahiko was assigned to Aekunishin as a personal deity. Soon after, a secondary theory arose stating that the deity assigned was actually Sukunabikona. The Kanayamahiko assignment theory, in relation to Mt. Nangu, is rooted in religious documents, as it is mentioned in both the Dainipponkoku Ichinomiyaki and the Engishiki Jinmeicho from the late Muromachi Period. There is also literature written down of folklore related to Mino Province's ichinomiya, Nangu Taisha (modern day Gifu Prefecture, Fuwa District, Tarui), but the evidence and details are lacking. On the other hand, Sukunabikona, also known as the pioneer deity, resembles the Iga Province's Osanakichigo-no-Miya from the Ryojin Hisho. This theory is believed to have been established around the end of the Heian Period. After that, from the end of the Muromachi Period to the mid. Edo Period, the two theories of Kanayamahime and Sukunabikona, and the three theories introducing Koga Saburo were established.

In the third year of the Shotoku Era (1713 AD), it was advocated that Prince Ohiko was actually the deity enshrined at Aekuni Shrine. This proposition was based on the fact that in both the Nihon Shoki and the Shinsen Shojiroku, Prince Ohiko is described as the founder of the Aya clan. Afterwards, the Prince Ohiko theory was adopted, and Koga Saburo was abolished from the pantheon.

== History ==
As with most Shinto shrines of ancient origin, the story of the shrine's founding is vague, contradictory and lacking in historical documentation. According to the shrine's own myth, it was founded by order of Empress Kōgyoku in 658 AD. The principal kami, Ōhiko-no-mikoto was the son of the semi-legendary Emperor Kōgen (reigned 214 to 157 BC). Per the Nihon Shoki and Kojiki, he was a general sent to conquer the Hokuriku region for Yamato, and was the ancestor of the Abe clan. After his return to Yamato, he was granted estates in the Asai District of Iga Province, where he eventually died and was buried in a kofun (megalithic tomb). The secondary kami, Sukunabikona is connected with the immigrant Hata clan, who were also living in this area. The shrine was originally located on the summit of Mount Nangū to the south, and was later relocated to its present site at the foot of the mountain. During the Heian period, another secondary kami, Kanayamahime, from the Nangū Taisha in Gifu Prefecture was moved to the old shrine at the summit of the mountain, hence where the name "Mount Nangū" originated. In the second year of the Jōgan Era (977 AD) mysterious words appeared, burned into the shinboku of the shrine at the summit. According to the words, Kanayamahime had moved to Aekuni Shrine at the foot of the mountain.

The shrine is listed in the Nihon Montoku Tennō Jitsuroku of 850 AD, Nihon Sandai Jitsuroku of 864 AD and the Engishiki records of 927 AD, and in the late Heian period Genpei Jōsuiki, it is called the "Ichinomiya Nangū Dai-Bosatsu". During the Nanboku-cho period, Southern Court Emperor Go-Murakami spent several days at the shrine and awarded it with an estate. However, during the 1579 Tenshō Iga War, the shrine was burned down by the forces of Oda Nobunaga. It was reconstructed in 1593 by yamabushi. In the Edo period, with construction of Iga Ueno Castle, the shrine was reconstructed in 1621 by order of Tōdō Takatora, as it protected the spiritually vulnerable northeast quadrant of the castle. After the Meiji restoration, the shrine was given the rank of National shrine, 2nd rank (国幣中社, kokuhei-chūsha) in the Modern system of ranked Shinto shrines in 1884.

It is believed that part of the original worship around Aekuni Shrine was the worship of Mount Nangū itself, as 200 meters south of Aekuni Shrine is a large boulder believed to be the iwakura (throne upon which the deity sits when it is worshiped). Currently, this boulder has been lost, however, a kofun has been found in the vicinity, along with evidence of the enshrining of a certain large boulder. It is believed that this boulder is the one worshiped at Aekuni Shrine's Oishi-sha.

== Shrine structures ==
- Honden
- Haiden
- Heiden
- Emaden
- Shamusho
- Momotaro Rock
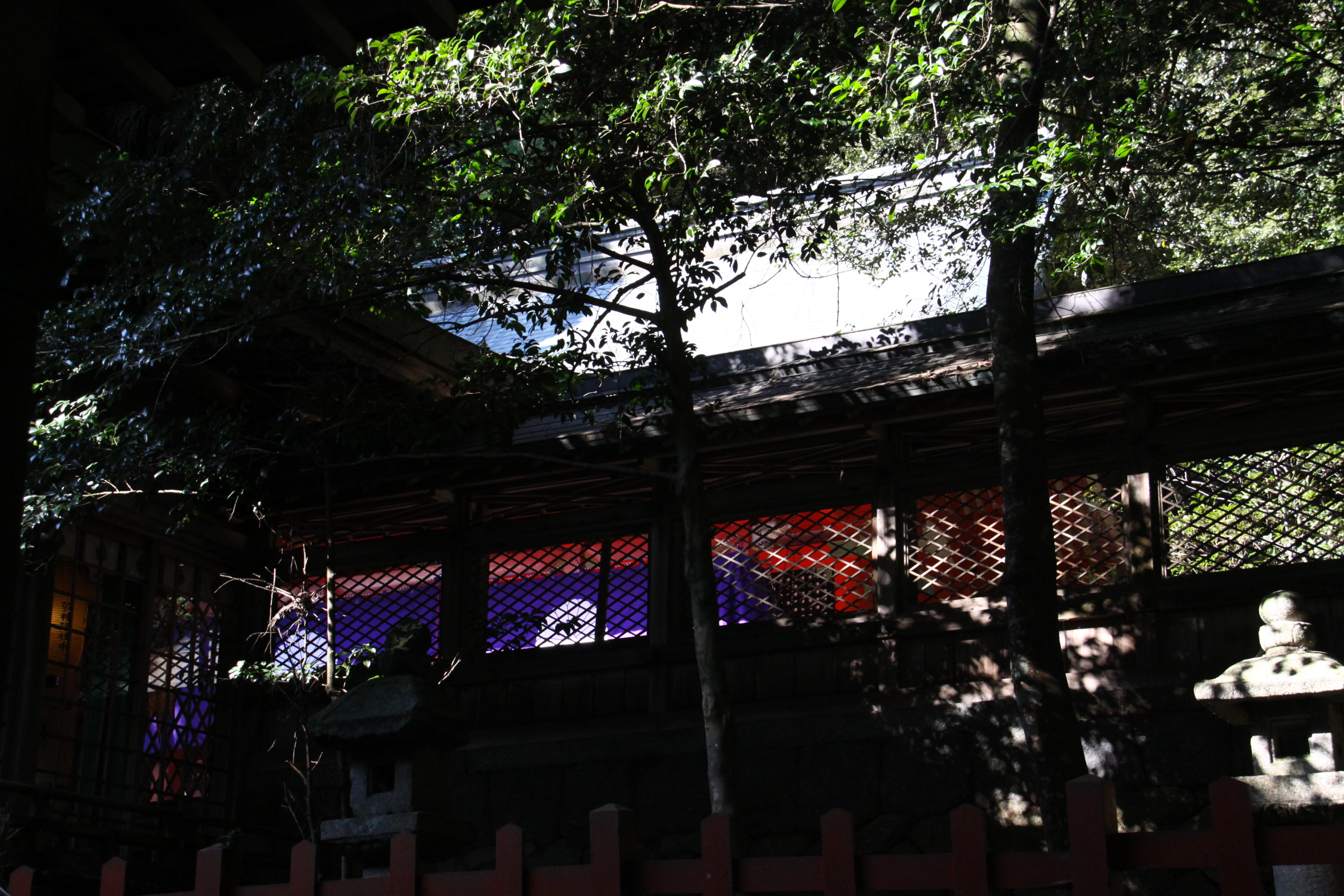
Honden

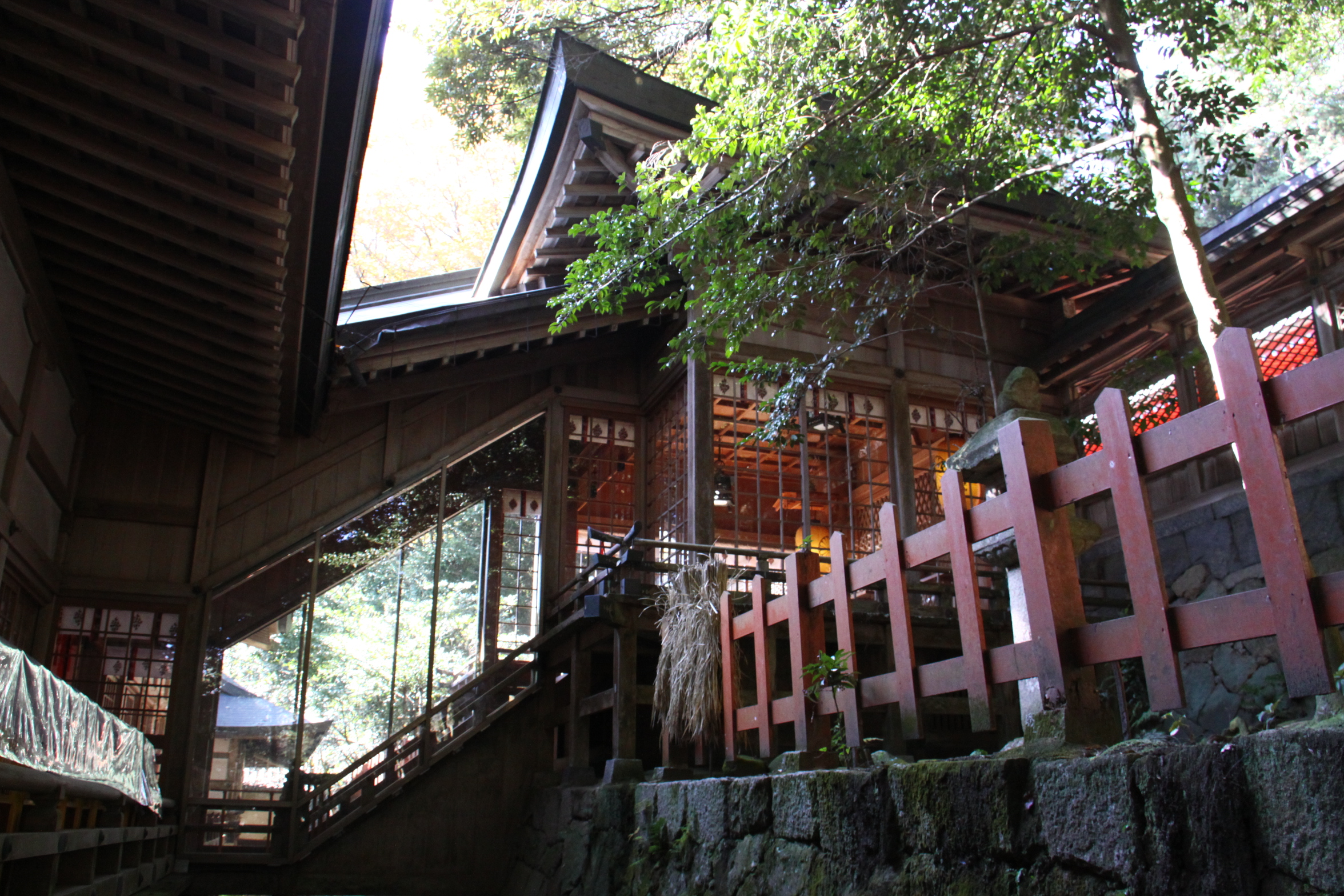
Heiden

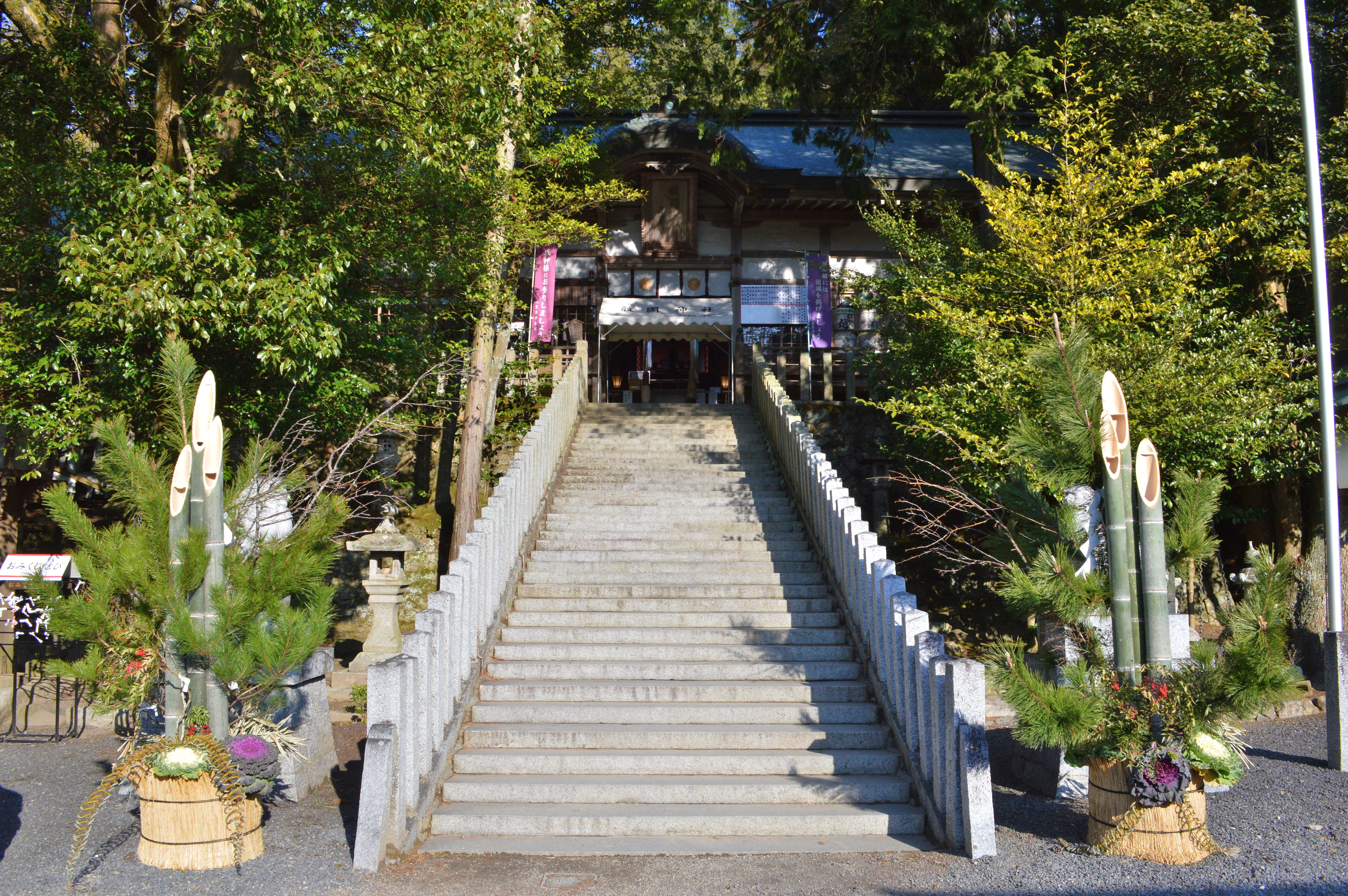
Haiden

== Auxiliary/branch shrines ==
=== Auxiliary shrines ===
- Rokusho-sha - On the eastern side of the main shrine
- Kusho-sha - On the western side of the main shrine

=== Branch shrines ===
- Wakamiya Hachiman-sha
- Kosazuke-sha (Shrine for conception)
- Shinmei-sha
- Kusunoki-sha (Shrine of the camphor tree)
- Musubi-sha (Shrine for marriage)
- Oishi-sha (Great stone shrine)
- Ichikishima jinja
- Asama-sha - The shrine that rests by Mt. Nangu’s summit
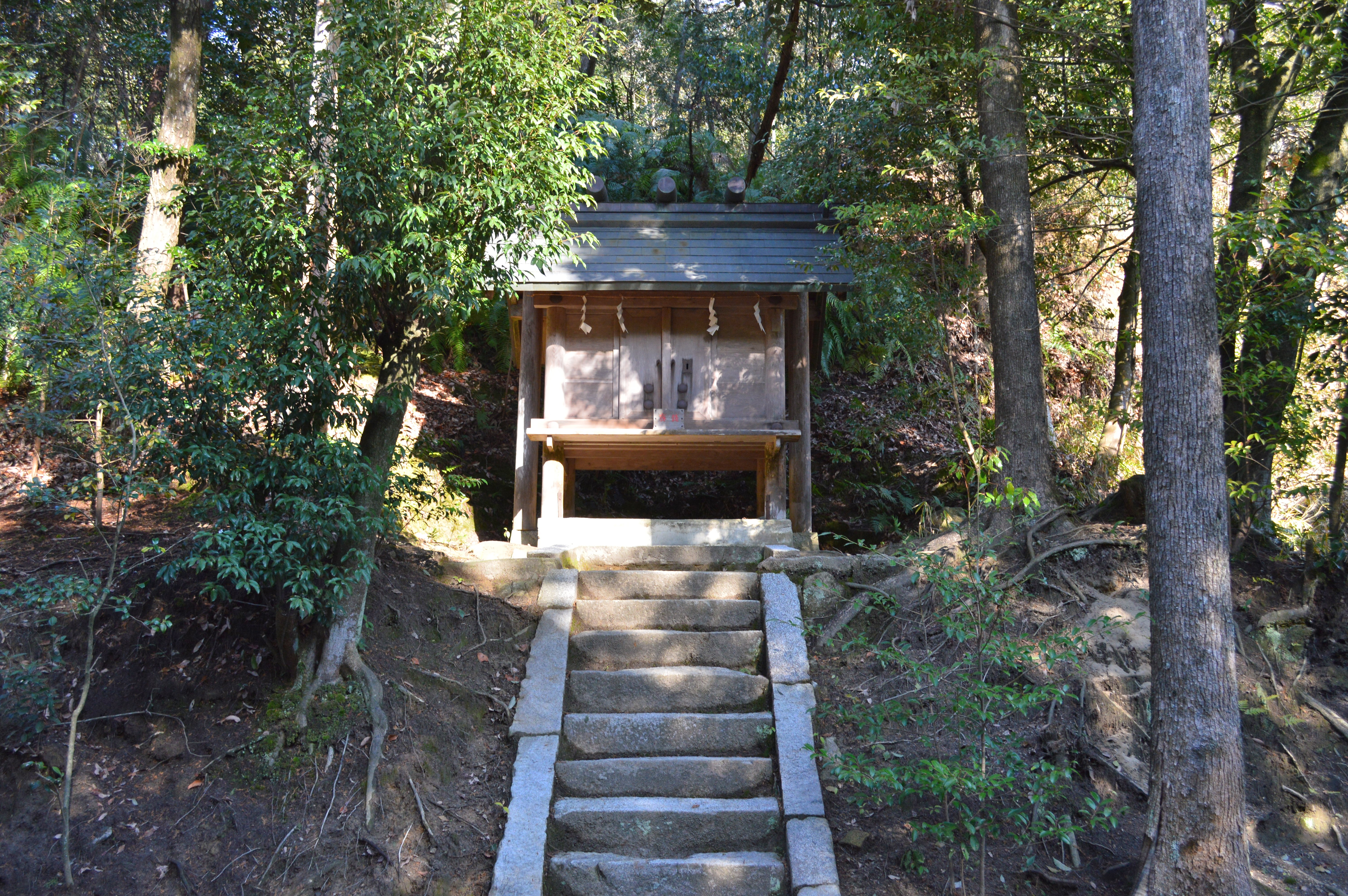
Wakamiya Hachiman

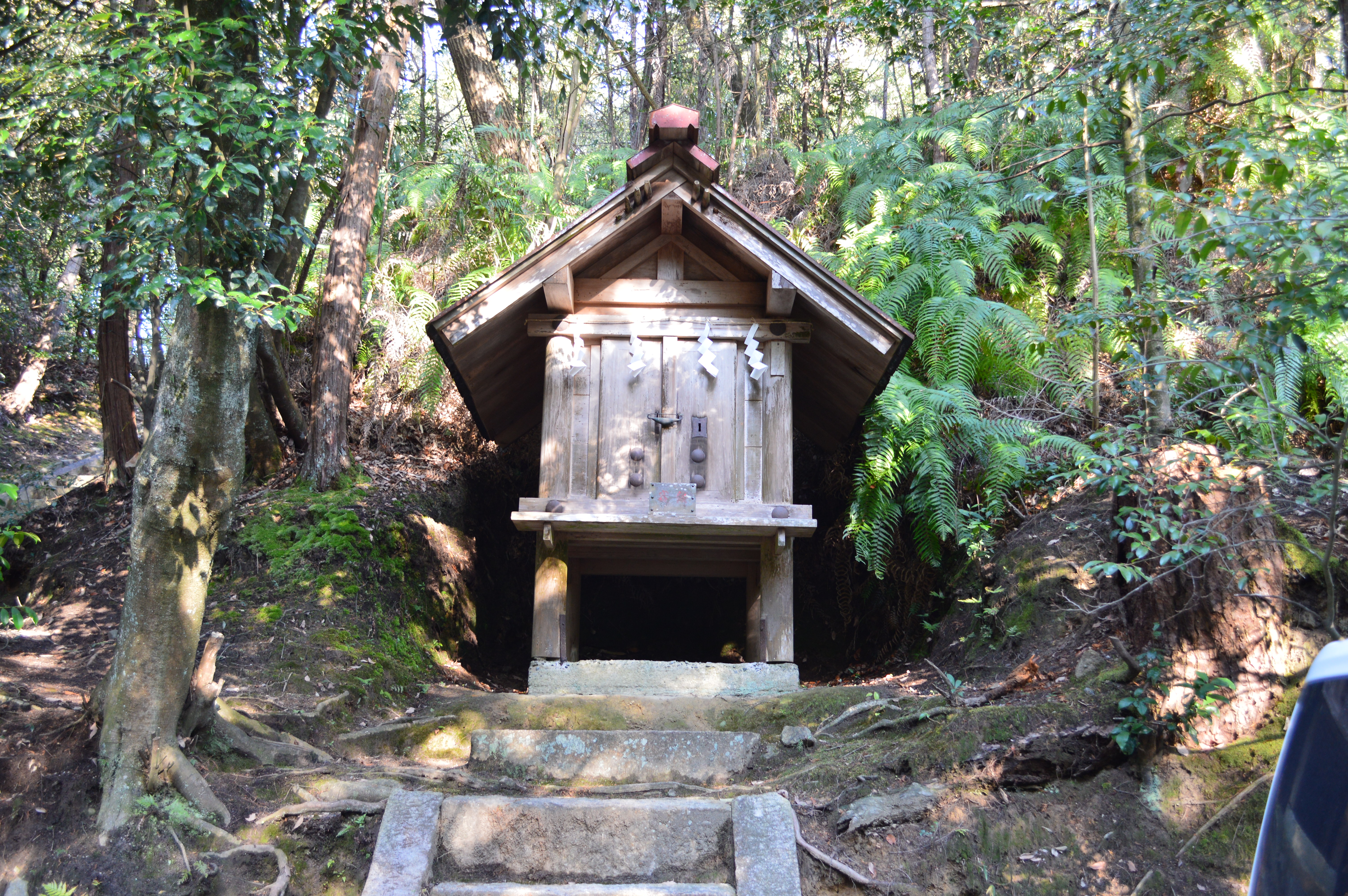
Kosazuke

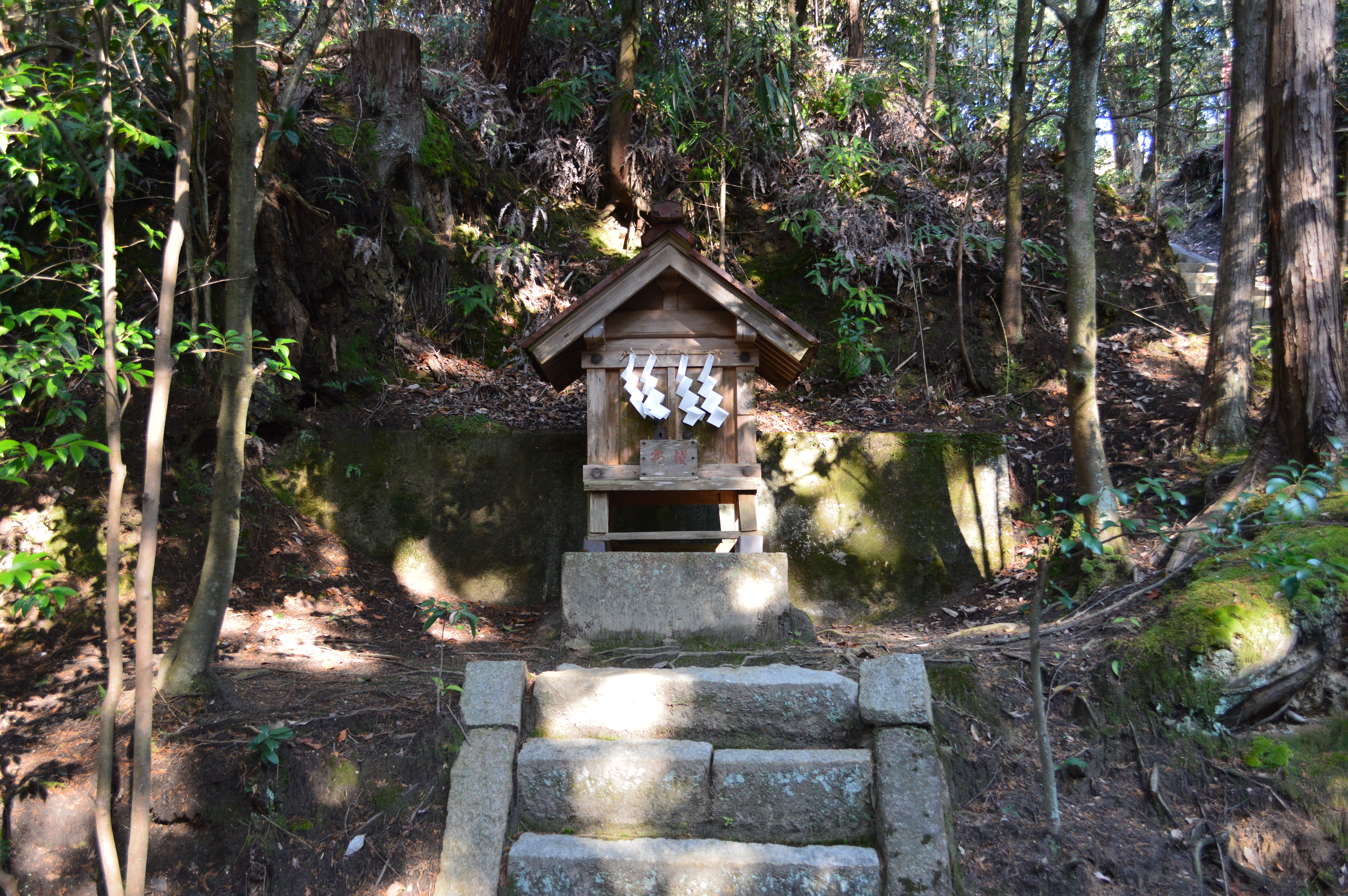
Shinmei

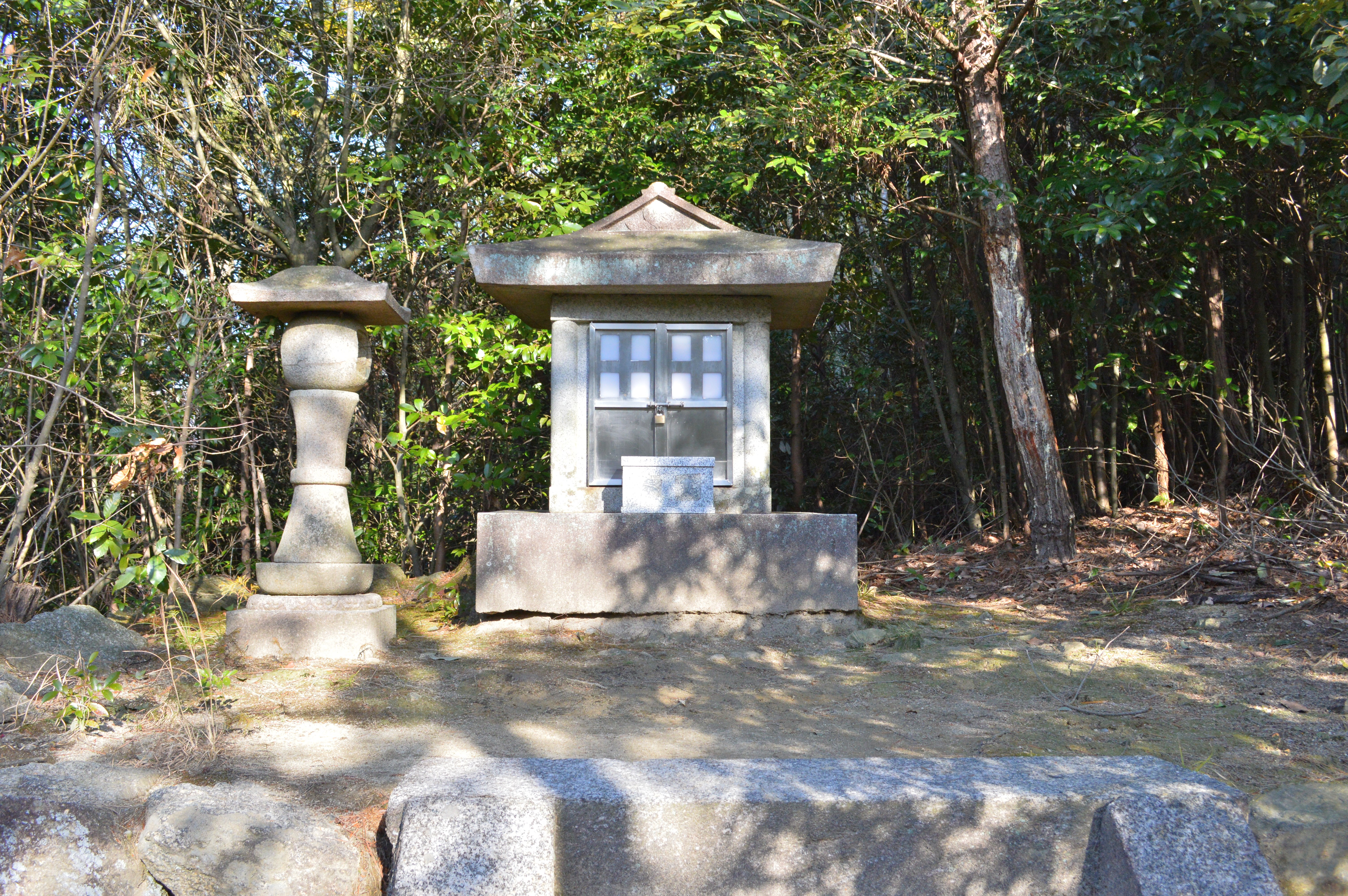
Kusunoki

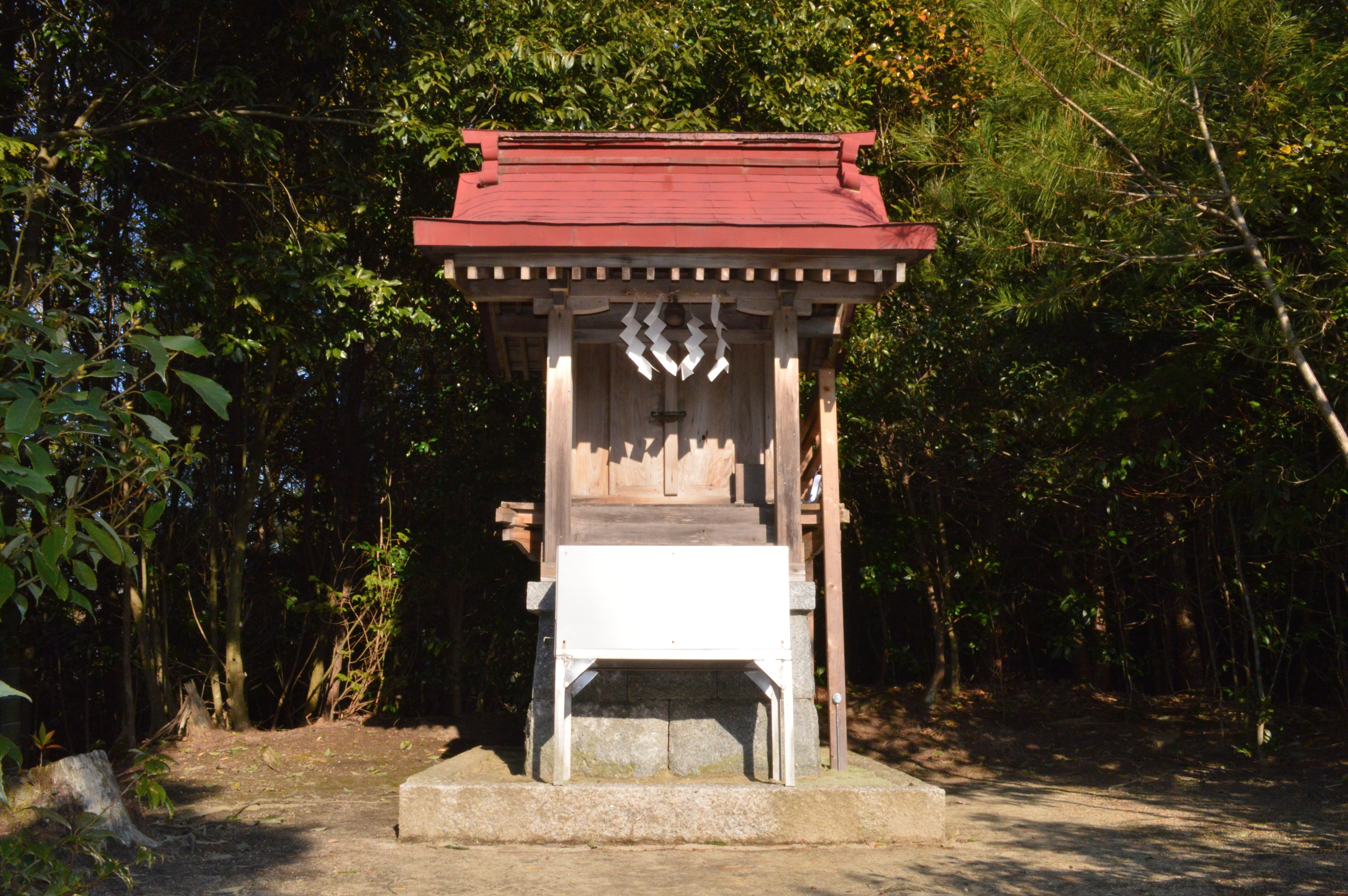
Musubi

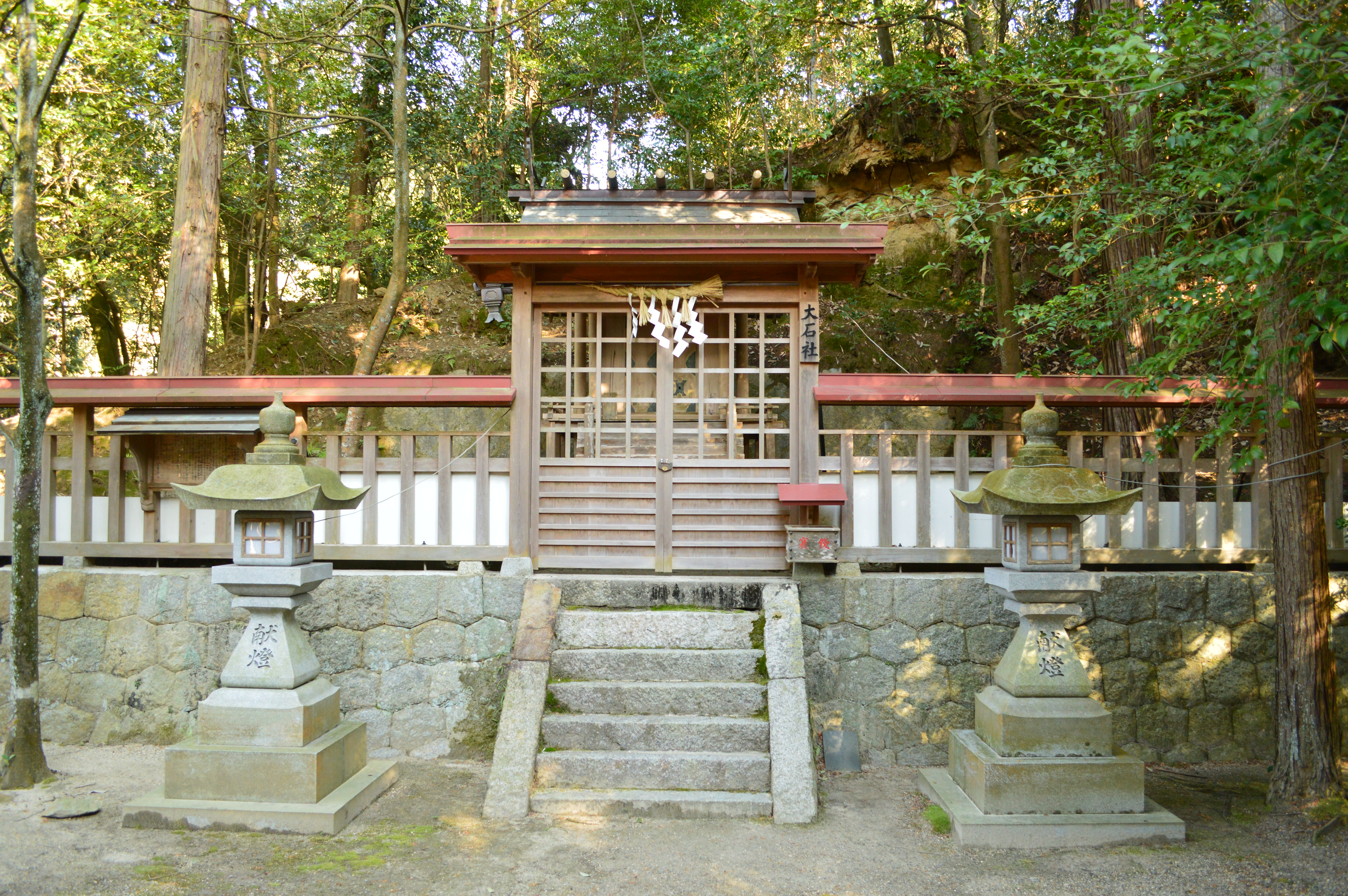
Great Stone Shrine

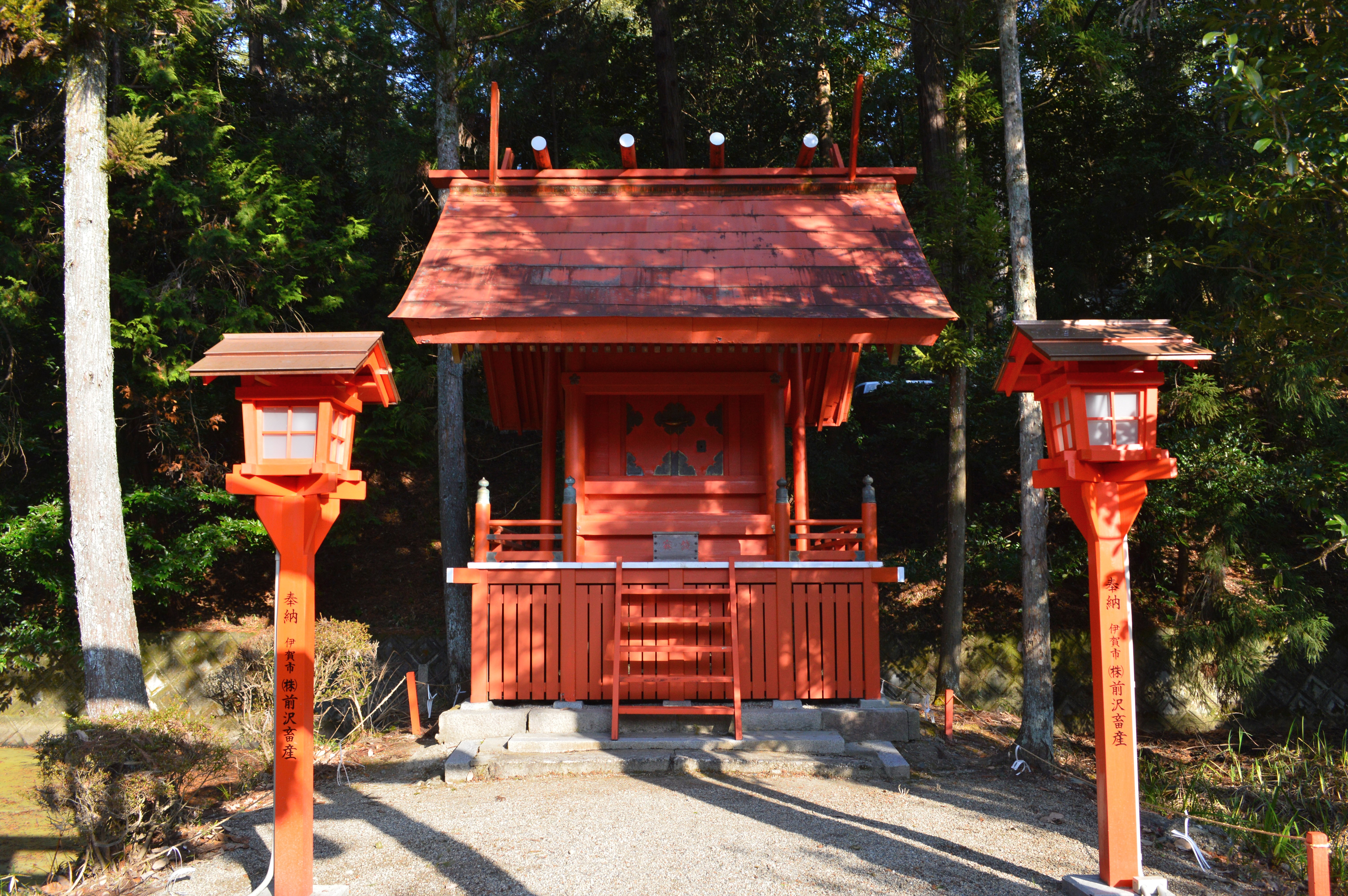
Ichikishima

== Festivals ==
- Every Month
  - Monthly festival (Held on the first of every month)
- January
  - New Year’s Day Festival (January 1)
  - First Ceremony of the Dancing Lion (January 3)
  - Festival of Reverence for Worshipers (January 11)
- February
  - Festival of Prayer for Warding off Evil (February 3)
  - Kigensai (February 11)
  - Prayer Festival (February 17)
  - Great Stone Shrine’s Festival of Prayer (February 17)
- April
  - Great Festival of Spring (April 17)
  - Festival of the Dancing Lion (April 17)
  - Great Stone Shrine’s Spring Festival (April 24)
  - Ichinomiya District’s Prayer Festival for Traffic Safety (April 24)
- June
  - The Association’s Annual Festival (4th Sunday of June)
  - Great Purification Festival (June 30)
- July
  - Great Stone Shrine’s Gion Festival (July 28)
- August
  - Shinto Ritual for the Circle of Thatch (August 1)
- September
  - Ichinomiya District’s Respect for the Elderly Festival (First Sunday of September)
  - Memorial service for those who have died related to the shrine (September 21)
- October
  - Kosha Grand Festival (The Sunday near October 10)
- November
  - The Emperor’s Harvest Ceremony (November 23)
  - Kokutou-sai (November 25)
- December
  - Asama Shrine Festival (December 1)
  - Idol Procession Festival (December 4)
  - Habitual Festival (December 5)
  - The Emperor’s Birthday (December 23)
  - Great Purification Festival (December 30)
  - New Year’s Eve (December 31)
- Full Moon Festival (Every full moon)

Kagura is performed at Aekuni Shrine’s Festivals of the Dancing Lion on January 3 and April 17, and at the annual shrine festival on December 5. It is said that kagura originated in the Keicho Era (1596 - 1615 AD). Across various parts of Iga are models of the lion kagura, and they have been designated a genuine intangible traditional cultural property of Mie Prefecture.

== Cultural properties ==
=== Mie Prefecture Designated Tangible Cultural Properties ===
- Paintings of 36 Immortals of Poetry (三十六歌仙扁額), Edo Period, 12 frames. Portraits of the 36 poets have been divided among twelve frames. It appears that these paintings were part of an article from “Koushitsu Nenpu Ryaku” in the 14th year of the Keicho Era (1609 AD), but the same article can be found in “Yamatoku”, in which the creator is wrongly attributed to be Kano Sanraku. The paintings are actually Konoe Nobutada’s brushwork. They were designated on March 17th, 2005.

=== Mie Prefecture Designated Intangible Cultural Folk Properties ===
- Aekuni Shrine’s Lion Dance (敢国神社の獅子舞). It was designated on April 1, 1954.

=== Iga City Designated Tangible Cultural Properties ===
- Yugama iron craftwork - Dedicated in the third year of the Keicho Era (1598). It was designated on November 22nd, 1958.
- Stone lantern craftwork - It was designated on February 26th, 2004.

== Local information ==
=== Location ===
- 877 Ichinomiya, Iga City, Mie Prefecture

=== Transportation access ===
- Bus
  - From the “Sindo Station South Exit” bus stop in front of Shindo Station (JR West Japan Kansai Main Line), take the Mie Kotsu bus (heading for the Ueno Industry Meeting Hall) and get off at the “Aekuni Shrine” stop
  - From the “Ueno Industry Meeting Hall” bus stop in front of Uenoshi Station (Iga Railway Iga Line), take the Mie Kotsu bus (heading for the Iga branch office) and get off at the “Aekuni Shrine” stop
- Car
  - Off Meihan National Highway (National Highway no. 25 Bypass), immediately from the Iga Ichinomiya Interchange

== See also ==
- Mihakayama Kofun
- List of Shinto shrines
- ichinomiya

== Related literature ==
- 『古事類苑』Imperial Shrine, Aekuni Shrine
  - 『古事類苑 第9冊』(National Diet Library Digital Collection) Refer to frames 168-171
- Anzu Motohiko's『神道辞典』Shrine News, 1968, p. 1
- 『神社辞典』published by Tokyodo, 1979, p. 3
