= Emperor Kōrei =

Legendary emperor of Japan

Emperor Kōrei 孝霊天皇
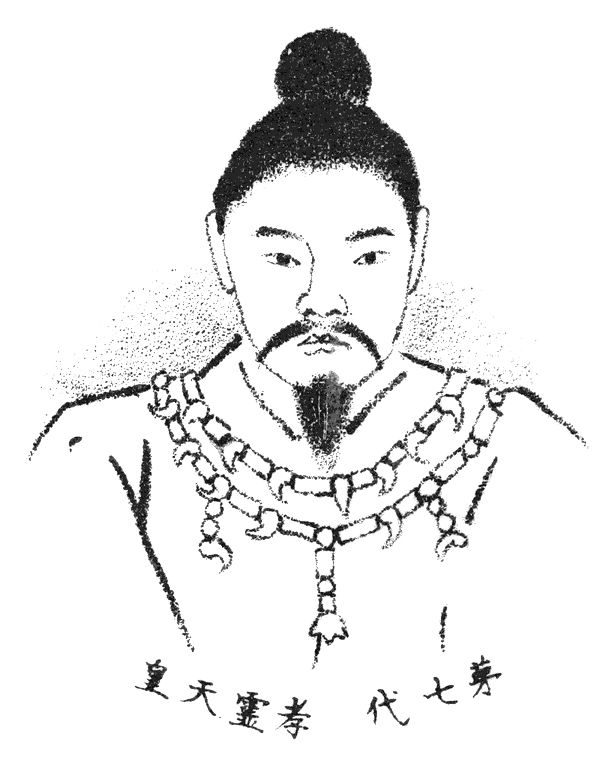

Emperor of Japan
- Reign: 290 BC – 215 BC (traditional)
- Predecessor: Kōan
- Successor: Kōgen
- Born: 342 BC
- Died: 215 BC (aged 127)
- Burial: Kataoka no Umasaka no misasagi (片丘馬坂陵) (Ōji)
- Spouse: Kuwashi-hime
- Issue among others...: Emperor Kōgen; Yamatototohimomoso-hime; Kibitsuhiko-no-mikoto
Posthumous name
- Chinese-style shigō: Emperor Kōrei (孝霊天皇) Japanese-style shigō: Ō-yamato-nekohiko-futoni no Sumeramikoto (大日本根子彦太瓊天皇)
- House: Imperial House of Japan
- Father: Emperor Kōan
- Mother: Oshihime
- Religion: Shinto

Emperor Kōrei (孝霊天皇, Kōrei-tennō), also known as Ōyamatonekohikofutoni no Mikoto (大倭根子日子賦斗邇命) was the seventh legendary emperor of Japan, according to the traditional order of succession. Very little is known about this Emperor due to a lack of material available for further verification and study. Kōrei is known as a "legendary emperor" among historians as his actual existence is disputed. Nothing exists in the Kojiki other than his name and genealogy. Kōrei's reign allegedly began in 290 BC. He had one wife and three consorts with whom he fathered seven children. After his death in 215 BC, one of his sons supposedly became the next emperor. Kōrei is traditionally accepted as the first emperor of the Yayoi period, which is named after the Yayoi people who migrated to the Japanese archipelago from mainland Asia.

== Legendary narrative ==
In the Kojiki and Nihon Shoki, only his name and genealogy were recorded. The Japanese have traditionally accepted this sovereign's historical existence, and an Imperial misasagi or tomb for Kōrei is currently maintained; however, no extant contemporary records have been discovered that confirm a view that this historical figure actually reigned. Kōrei was born in 342 BC and is believed to be the eldest son of Emperor Kōan. His mother is believed to have been Oshihime, who was the daughter of Ametarashihiko-Kunio-shihito-no-mikoto. Kōrei's pre-ascension name was Prince O-Yamato-Neko Hiko-futo-ni no Mikoto, and the Kojiki records that he ruled from the palace of Kuroda-noi-odo-no-miya (黒田廬戸宮) at Kuroda in what would come to be known as Yamato Province. It is noted in the Kojiki that sometime during Kōrei's reign, Kibi was conquered by the emperor. Kōrei was the first emperor since Jimmu to take on consorts, and fathered seven children with them along with his chief wife Empress: Kuwashi-hime. Kōrei is recorded as having a long life, reigning from 290 BC until his death in 215 BC. His eldest son was then subsequently enthroned as the next emperor.

== Known information ==
The existence of at least the first nine Emperors is disputed due to insufficient material available for further verification and study. Kōrei is thus regarded by historians as a "legendary Emperor", and is considered to have been the sixth of eight Emperors without specific legends associated with them. (Note: Also known as the "eight undocumented monarchs" (欠史八代, Kesshi-hachidai).) The name Kōrei-tennō was assigned to him posthumously by later generations. His name might have been regularized centuries after the lifetime ascribed to Kōrei, possibly during the time in which legends about the origins of the imperial dynasty were compiled as the chronicles known today as the Kojiki. As with Emperor Kōan, Kōrei's exceptional age of 127 is considered unlikely due to verification issues among other things. While the actual site of Kōrei's grave is not known, the Emperor is traditionally venerated at a memorial Shinto shrine (misasagi) in Ōji. The Imperial Household Agency designates this location as Kōrei's mausoleum, and its formal name is Kataoka no Umasaka no misasagi.

Like Emperor Kōshō, there is a possibility that "Kōrei" could have lived instead in the 1st century (AD). Historian Louis Frédéric notes this idea in his book Japan Encyclopedia where he says it is "very likely", but this remains disputed among other researchers. The first emperor that historians state might have actually existed is Emperor Sujin, the 10th emperor of Japan. Outside of the Kojiki, the reign of Emperor Kinmei (Note: The 29th Emperor) (c. 509 – 571 AD) is the first for which contemporary historiography is able to assign verifiable dates. The conventionally accepted names and dates of the early Emperors were not confirmed as "traditional" though, until the reign of Emperor Kanmu (Note: Kanmu was the 50th sovereign of the imperial dynasty) between 737 and 806 AD.

== Consorts and children ==
- Empress: Kuwashi-hime (細媛命), Shiki no Agatanushi Oome's daughter
  - Son: Prince Ōyamatonekohikokunikuru (大日本根子彦国牽尊), later Emperor Kōgen
- Consort: Kasuga no Chichihayamawaka-hime (春日之千千速真若比売)
  - Daughter: Princess Chichihaya-hime (千千速比売命)
- Consort: Yamato no Kunika-hime (倭国香媛), Wachitsumi's daughter
  - Daughter: Yamatototohimomoso-hime (倭迹迹日百襲媛命), buried in Hashihaka tumulus (there exists a claim that she is the shaman-queen Himiko)
  - Son: Prince Kojiki (古事記)
  - Son: Prince Kibitsuhiko-no-mikoto (吉備津彦命), ancestor of Kibi clan
  - Daughter: Princess Yamatototowakaya-hime (倭迹迹稚屋姫命)
- Consort: Haeirodo (絙某弟), Yamato no Kunikahime's sister
  - Son: Prince Hikosashima (彦狭島命)
  - Son: Wakatakehiko (稚武彦命), ancestor of Kibi clan
- Consort: Mashita-hime (真舌媛), Toshihiko Ohihiko's daughter

== See also ==
- Emperor of Japan
- List of Emperors of Japan
- Imperial cult

== Notes ==
Regnal titles
Preceded by Emperor Kōan	Legendary Emperor of Japan; 290 BC – 215 BC (traditional dates)	Succeeded by Emperor Kōgen
