= Utsushikome =

Utsushikome 欝色謎命

Empress consort of Japan
- Tenure: 208 BC – 157 BC

Empress dowager of Japan
- Tenure: appointed 157 BC
- Spouse: Emperor Kōgen
- Issue: Prince Ōhiko; Prince Sukunaokokoro; Emperor Kaika; Princess Yamatototo-hime
- Father: Oyaguchi Sukune
- Mother: Sakado Yuramiyakohime

Utsushikome (欝色謎命) was empress consort of Japan from 208 BC to 157 BC, and empress dowager from 157 BC. Her father was a man named Oyaguchi Sukune and her mother was a woman named Sakado Yuramiyakohime.

== Life ==
She was the wife of Emperor Kōgen. However little information exists about her. Her husband belongs to a group of Emperor's known as "Kesshi-hachidai" or "eight generations lacking history". As such there is little information about her and her husband. However, both her parents are mentioned whereas typically only the fathers of Empress Consorts were ever recorded (if any of the parents were recorded in the first place).

== Notes ==
Japanese royalty
Preceded by Kuwashi-hime	Empress consort of Japan; 208–157 BC	Succeeded by Ikagashikome
Preceded by Kuwashi-hime	Empress dowager of Japan appointed in 157 BC	Succeeded by Ikagashikome
