= Ikagashikome =

Japanese Empress

Empress consort of Japan
- Tenure: 14 June, 1st year of Kaika

Empress dowager of Japan
- Tenure: appointed on January 13, 1st year of Sujin
- Spouse: Emperor Kōgen; Emperor Kaika
- Issue: Prince Hikofutsuoshinomakoto (彦太忍信命), grandfather of Takenouchi no Sukune (武内宿禰), Emperor Sujin, Princess Mimatsuhime (御真津比売命)
- House: Mononobe clan Imperial House of Japan
- Father: Ōhesoki

Ikagashikome (伊香色謎 or 伊迦賀色許売命, ? – after January 13, 1st year of Sujin) (Note: 伊香-色謎 (Ikaga-shikome)) was a legendary concubine of Emperor Kōgen and Empress consort of Emperor Kaika. She is written as 伊香色謎 in Nihon Shoki, and is written as 伊迦賀色許売 in Kojiki.

She was the daughter of Ōhesoki. As a concubine of Emperor Kōgen, she gave birth of Prince Hikofutsu-oshi-no-makoto (彦太忍信命) no mikoto, who is a father of Takenouchi no Sukune (武内宿禰) (also known as Takeshiuchi no Sukune). After the death of Kōgen, she married Emperor Kaika and became Empress consort of him and mother of Emperor Sujin and Princess Mimatsu-hime (御真津比売命). She was the empress dowager from the 1st year of Sujin.

== Family ==
- Paternal grandfather: Ōyakuchi-no-sukune no mikoto (大矢口宿禰命)
- Paternal grandmother: Sakato-no-yuratsu-hime (坂戸由良都姫)
  - Father: Ōhesoki no mikoto (大綜麻杵命) [ancestor of the Mononobe clan]
  - Mother: Takaya-no-awara-hime (高屋阿波良姫)
    - Elder brother: Ikaga-shiko-o no mikoto (伊香色雄命)
- Spouse: Emperor Kōgen
  - Son: Hiko-futsu-oshi-no-makoto no mikoto (彦太忍信命)
    - Grandson: Takenouchi no Sukune (武内宿禰) in Nihon Shoki
- Spouse: Emperor Kaika
  - Son: Emperor Sujin
    - Grandson: Emperor Suinin
    - Grandson: Yasaka-no-irihiko no mikoto (八坂入彦命)
  - Daughter: Mimatsu-hime (御真津比売命)

== Note list ==
Japanese royalty
Preceded by Utsushikome	Empress consort of Japan; 1st year of Kaika -	Succeeded by Mimaki-hime
Preceded by Utsushikome	Empress dowager of Japan appointed in 1st year of Sujin -	Succeeded by Mimaki-hime
