= Koshiō Shrine =

Shrine in Akita, Japan

Coordinates: 39.7362°N 140.0831°E

- 古四王神社
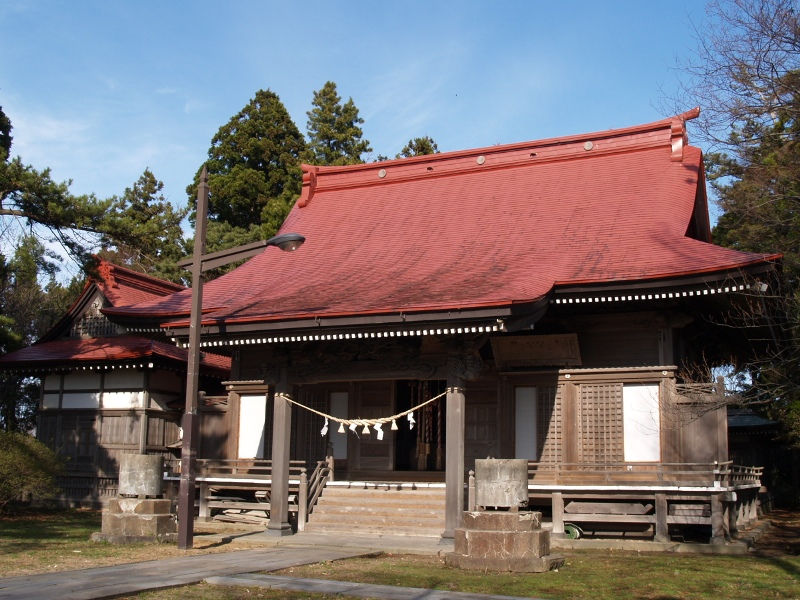

Religion
- Affiliation: Shinto
- Prefecture: Akita Prefecture
- Deity: Ōhiko no Mikoto, Takemikazuchi
- Festival: May 8
- Type: Kokuhei Shōsha, Beppyo

Location
- Location: 1 Chome-5-55 Terauchikozakura, Akita, 011-0909
- Interactive map of Koshiō Shrine
- Prefecture: Akita Prefecture

Architecture
- Established: 658; 1368 years ago

Koshiō Shrine (古四王神社, Koshiō jinja) is a Shinto shrine located in Akita, Akita Prefecture, Japan. It enshrines the kami of Ōhiko no mikoto (大彦命) and Takemikazuchi no mikoto (武甕槌命). Its annual festival takes place on May 8. According to legend, was established in 658.

== See also ==
- List of Shinto shrines in Japan
