= Kuwashi-hime =

Japanese empress

Kuwashi-hime 細媛命

Empress consort of Japan
- Tenure: 289 – 214 BC

Empress dowager of Japan
- Tenure: appointed in 214 BC
- Spouse: Emperor Kōrei
- Issue: Emperor Kōgen
- Father: Shikinoagatanushi no Oome

Kuwashi-hime no Mikoto (細媛命; also read as Hoso-hime no Mikoto), was the empress of Emperor Kōrei. She was also the birth mother of Emperor Kōgen.

== Life ==
Kuwashi-hime, was born as the daughter to the governor of Ise Province. She married Emperor Kōrei and gave birth to Emperor Kōgen. However, little information exists about her. Her husband belongs to a group of Emperor's known as "Kesshi-hachidai" or "eight generations lacking history". As such there is little information about her and her husband.

== Notes ==
Japanese royalty
Preceded by Oshihime	Empress consort of Japan; 289–214 BC	Succeeded by Utsushikome
Preceded by Oshihime	Empress dowager of Japan appointed in 214 BC	Succeeded by Utsushikome
