= Yamato-totohi-momoso-hime =

Japanese legendary princess and kami

Yamato-totohi-momoso-hime (倭迹迹日百襲姫) is a figure in Japanese legend and a kami in Shinto who is the primary character of the Hashihaka Legend where she is said to have divination abilities. According to legend, she was the daughter of Emperor Kōrei and wife of Emperor Sujin.

She is now enshrined in Tamura Shrine in Kagawa Prefecture and Kibitsu Shrine in Okayama.

She is also known by the name Yamato-tomomoso-bime (夜麻登登母母曾毘売).
