= Kibitsuhiko-no-mikoto =

Son of emperor Korei

Kibitsu-hiko-no-mikoto (吉備津彦命), also known as Hiko Isuseri-hiko no mikoto, was a legendary Japanese prince.

According to the Nihon Shoki, he was the son of Emperor Kōrei. Legend says this prince slayed an ogre called Ura, which may be the demonization of the Kingdom of Kibi, destroyed during the reign of Kōrei-Tennō.

His kami is enshrined at Shinto shrines in Okayama Prefecture and Hiroshima Prefecture.
