= Emperor Kōgen =

Legendary emperor of Japan

Emperor Kōgen 孝元天皇
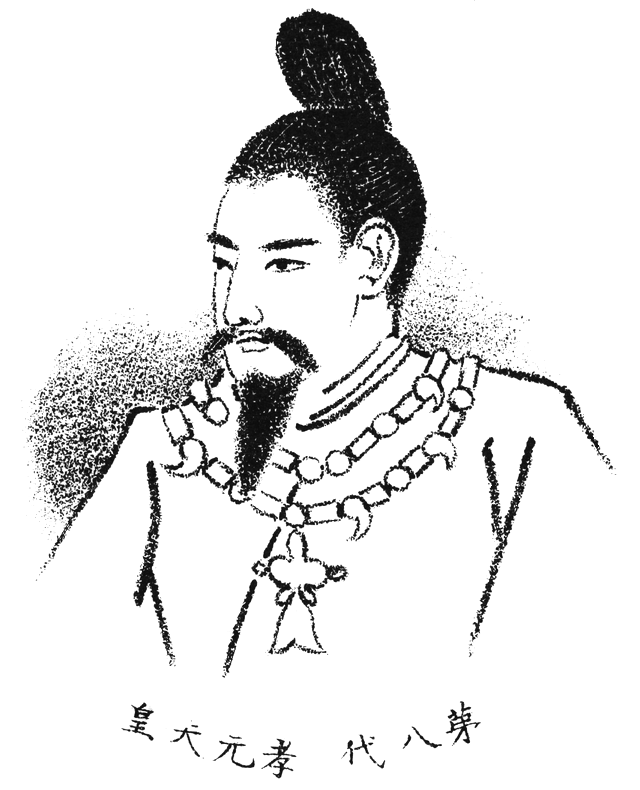

Emperor of Japan
- Reign: 214 BC – 158 BC (traditional)
- Predecessor: Kōrei
- Successor: Kaika
- Born: 273 BC
- Died: 158 BC (aged 115)
- Burial: Tsurugi no ike no shima no e no misasagi (劔池嶋上陵) (Kashihara)
- Spouse: Utsushikome-no-Mikoto
- Issue among others...: Emperor Kaika
Posthumous name
- Chinese-style shigō: Emperor Kōgen (孝元天皇) Japanese-style shigō: Ō-yamato-nekohikokuni-kuru no Sumeramikoto (大日本根子彦国牽天皇)
- House: Imperial House of Japan
- Father: Emperor Kōrei
- Mother: Kuwashi-hime
- Religion: Shinto

Emperor Kōgen (孝元天皇, Kōgen-tennō), also known as Ōyamatonekohikokunikuru no Mikoto (大倭根子日子国玖琉命) was the eighth legendary emperor of Japan, according to the traditional order of succession. Very little is known about this Emperor due to a lack of material available for further verification and study. Kōgen is known as a "legendary emperor" among historians as his actual existence is disputed. Nothing exists in the Kojiki other than his name and genealogy. Kōgen's reign allegedly began in 214 BC, he had one wife and two consorts whom he fathered six children with. After his death in 158 BC, one of his sons supposedly became Emperor Kaika.

== Legendary narrative ==
In the Kojiki and Nihon Shoki, only Kōgen's name and genealogy were recorded. The Japanese have traditionally accepted this sovereign's historical existence, and an Imperial misasagi or tomb for Kōgen is currently maintained; however, no extant contemporary records have been discovered that confirm a view that this historical figure actually reigned. Kōgen was born sometime in 273 BC, and is recorded as being the eldest son of Emperor Kōrei. His empress mother was named "Kuwashi-hime", who was the daughter of Shiki no Agatanushi Oome. Before he was enthroned sometime in 214 BC, his pre-ascension name was Prince Ō-yamato-neko-hiko-kuni-kuru no Mikoto. The Kojiki records that he ruled from the palace of Sakaihara-no-miya (軽之堺原宮; and in the Nihon Shoki as 軽境原宮) at Karu in what would come to be known as Yamato Province. Emperor Kōgen had a chief wife (empress) named Utsushikome, along with two consorts. His first son was named Prince Ōhiko, and according to the Nihon Shoki was the direct ancestor of the Abe clan. One of Kōgen's other sons, Prince Hikofutsuoshinomakoto, was also the grandfather of the legendary Japanese hero-statesman Takenouchi no Sukune. Emperor Kōgen reigned until his death in 158 BC; his second son was then enthroned as the next emperor.

== Known information ==
The existence of at least the first nine Emperors is disputed due to insufficient material available for further verification and study. Kōgen is thus regarded by historians as a "legendary Emperor", and is considered to have been the seventh of eight Emperors without specific legends associated with them. (Note: Also known as the "eight undocumented monarchs" (欠史八代, Kesshi-hachidai).) The name Kōgen-tennō was assigned to him posthumously by later generations. His name might have been regularized centuries after the lifetime ascribed to Kōgen, possibly during the time in which legends about the origins of the imperial dynasty were compiled as the chronicles known today as the Kojiki. While the actual site of Kōgen's grave is not known, the Emperor is traditionally venerated at a memorial Shinto shrine (misasagi) in Kashihara. The Imperial Household Agency designates this location as Kōgen's mausoleum, and its formal name is Tsurugi no ike no shima no e no misasagi.

The first emperor that historians state might have actually existed is Emperor Sujin, the 10th emperor of Japan. Outside of the Kojiki, the reign of Emperor Kinmei (Note: The 29th Emperor) (c. 509 – 571 AD) is the first for which contemporary historiography is able to assign verifiable dates. The conventionally accepted names and dates of the early Emperors were not confirmed as "traditional" though, until the reign of Emperor Kanmu (Note: Kanmu was the 50th sovereign of the imperial dynasty) between 737 and 806 AD.

== Consorts and children ==
- Empress: Utsushikome (欝色謎命; d.157 BC), Oyakuchisukune's daughter
  - Prince Ōhiko (大彦命), ancestor of all the Abe clan's descendants. (Note: The first "Abe" was known as Abe no Omi (阿倍臣).)
  - Prince Sukunaokokoro (少彦男心命)
  - Prince Wakayamatonekohikooobi (稚日本根子彦大日日尊), later Emperor Kaika.
  - Princess Yamatototo-hime (倭迹迹姫命)
- Consort: Ikagashikome (伊香色謎命), Ōhesoki's daughter
  - Prince Hikofutsuoshinomakoto (彦太忍信命), grandfather of Takenouchi no Sukune (武内宿禰).
- Consort: Haniyasu-hime (埴安媛), Kawachi-no-Aotamakake's daughter
  - Prince Takehaniyasuhiko ((武埴安彦命; d.88 BC)

== See also ==
- Emperor of Japan
- List of Emperors of Japan
- Imperial cult

== Notes ==
Regnal titles
Preceded by Emperor Kōrei	Legendary Emperor of Japan; 214 BC – 158 BC (traditional dates)	Succeeded by Emperor Kaika
