= Louis Frédéric =

French Indologist

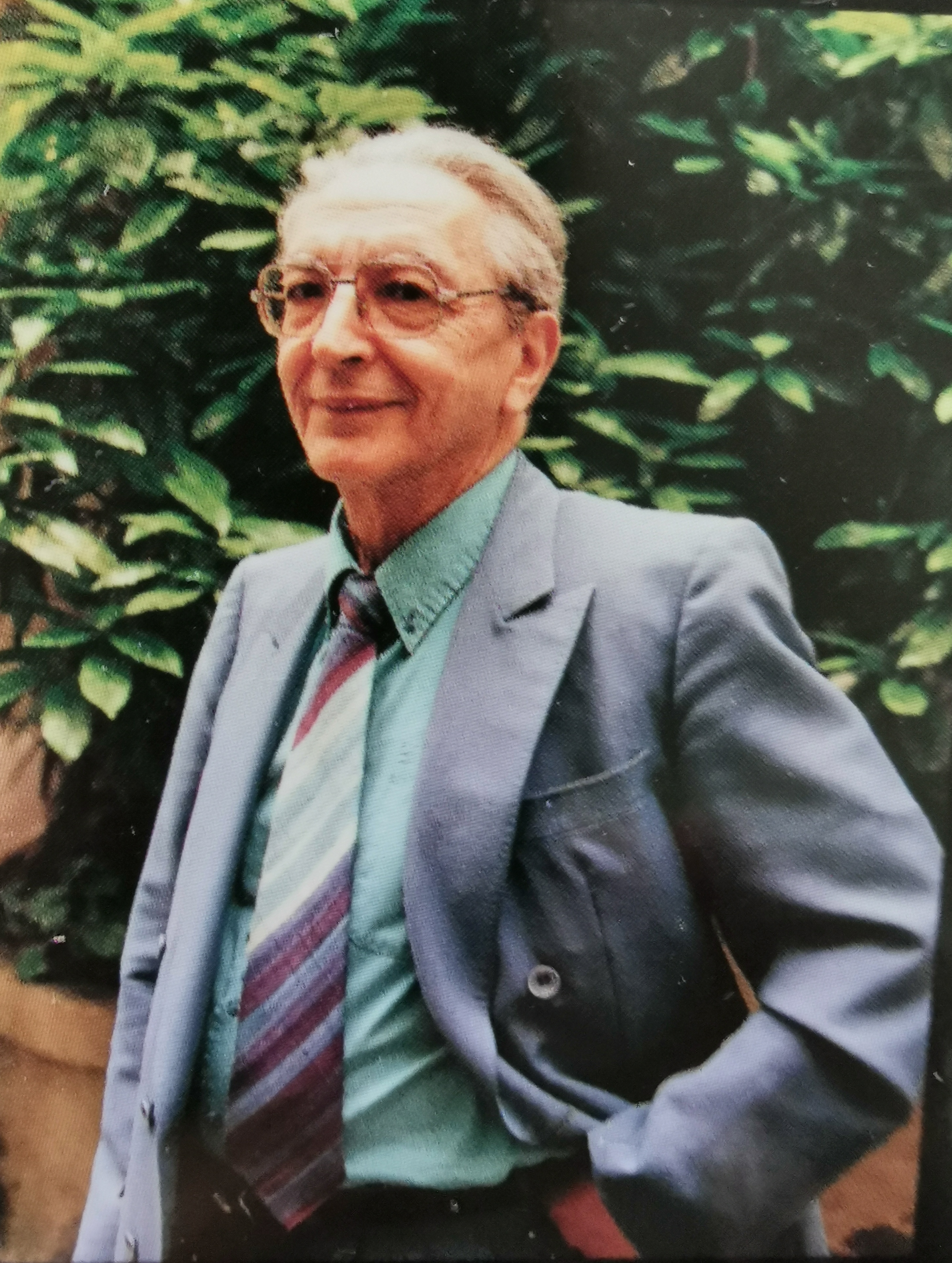
Louis Frédéric

Louis-Frédéric Nussbaum, also known as Louis Frédéric or Louis-Frédéric (1923–1996), was a French scholar, art historian, writer and editor. He was a specialist in the cultures of Asia, especially India and Japan.

== Early life ==
Louis-Frédéric was born in Paris in 1923. He studied at the Sorbonne and the École Pratique des Hautes Études.

== Career ==
Louis-Frédéric wrote many books on India, Japan and Southeast Asia. He was the editor of the 10-volume Encyclopaedia of Asian Civilizations which was published in eight editions in English between 1977 and 1987. Louis-Frédéric's Japan Encyclopedia is published by the Harvard University Press; and it has six editions in English and French between 1996 and 2005.

== Selected works ==
- Dans les pas du Bouddha, introduction de Jean Filliozat, professeur au Collège de France, Edition Hachette, Paris, 1957, 128p.
- L'Inde jour et nuit, Edition Julliard, Paris, 1957.
- La Danse sacrée de l'Inde, Éditions Arts et Métiers Graphiques, Paris, 1957, 136 p., rééd. 2010, 144 p.
- L'Inde, temples et sculptures, Éditions Arts et Métiers Graphiques, introduction de Jean Naudou, Paris, 1959, 470 p. traduction Thames and Hudson, Londres; Abrams, New York; Kohlhammer Verlag, Stuttgart.
- Yoga-asanas, Éditions J. Olivien, Paris, 1957, réédition 1959,1961.
- Dieux et brâhmanes, Edition Livre de Paris, Paris, 1961.
- Le Règne des idoles, Edition Hachette, Paris, 1961. traduction Codex, Buenos Aires.
- Tout autour de toi, Prix Lica 1962, Edition Emile Paul, Paris, 1960.
- L'Inde au fil des jours, collection Connaissance de l'Asie, Société continentale d'éditions modernes illustrées, Paris, 1963, 337 p. réédition 1970.
- Sud-Est asiatique, temples et sculptures, Éditions Arts et Métiers Graphiques, Paris, 1964, 434 p. traduction Abrams, New York; Burkhardt, Essen.
- Trésors de l'art des Indes, Edition Marabout, Verviers, 1965.
- Manuel pratique d'archéologie, Éditions Robert Laffont, Paris, 1967,432 p., réédition 1978 et 1983, traduction Marabout, Bruxelles; Ugo Mursia, Milan; Almedina, Coimbra.
- La Vie quotidienne au Japon à l'époque des samouraï (1185–1603), Éditions Hachette, 1968, 258 p. traduction Famot, Genève; Allen & Unwin, Londres; Praeger, New York; Tuttle, Tôkyô; Gondolat, Budapest; Panstwovy, Varsovie; Rizzoli, Milan; Mondadori, Milan.
- Fêtes et traditions au pays du Soleil Levant, collection Connaissance de l'Asie, Editions Société continentale d'éditions modernes illustrées, Paris, 1970, 364 p.réédition Chiron, 1975.
- Tôkyô, Éditions Tallandier, Paris, 1969.
- Japon, art et civilisation, Editions Arts et Métiers Graphiques, Paris, 1969 (traduction Thames and Hudson, Londres; Abrams, New York).
- Le Shintô, esprit et religion du Japon, Éditions Bordas, Paris, 1972, 159 p.
- L'Inde, phénomène spirituel, Edition Bordas, Paris, 1972.
- Le Japon en collaboration avec J.Pezeu-Masabuau, Encyclopoche, Larousse, Paris, 1977.
- In Quest of the Bible ( Archeology and the Scriptures), Ferni, Genève, 1978; Montréal, Canada, 1978.
- Encyclopædia of Asian Civilizations (10 vol.), J.-M. Place, Paris 1977–1987.
- Le Tir à l'Arc, technique et matériel, Edition Robert Laffont, Paris, 1979, réédition 1985.
- La Peinture indienne, Edition Famot, Genève, 1980.
- La Vie quotidienne dans la péninsule indochinoise à l'époque d'Angkor (800–1300), Edition Hachette, Paris, 1981.
- Dictionnaire de l'archéologie en collaboration avec Guy Rachet, Edition Robert Laffont, 1983.
- La Vie quotidienne au Japon au début de l'ère moderne (1868–1912), Éditions Hachette, 1984, 404 p. traduction Panstwovy Varsovie; Hollandia, Amsterdam.
- Le Tigre et la Rose (vie de Nûr Jahân), Edition Robert Laffont, Paris, 1984.traduction Nea Synora, Athènes.
- La Route de la Soie, en collaboration avec des auteurs chinois, Edition Arthaud, Paris, 1985.
- Kangxi, grand Khân de Chine, Edition Arthaud, Paris, 1985.
- Japon, l'empire éternel, Éditions du Félin, collection « Les Racines de la connaissance », Paris, 1985.
- Akbar, le Grand Moghol, Edition Denoël, Paris, 1986.
- Japon intime, Éditions du Félin, coll. « Les Racines de la connaissance », 1985, 396 p.
- Le Japon, hier et aujourd'hui, Belford, Paris, 1986; traduction Scala, Milan.
- Dictionnaire de la civilisation indienne, édition Robert Laffont, collection Bouquins, 1987, 1276 p.
- Le Lotus, Edition le Félin, Paris, 1988.
- Dictionnaire des Arts martiaux, Edition Le Félin, Paris, 1988; réédition 1993 (traduction Athlon Pres, Londres; Sperling & Kupfer, Milan).
- Dictionnaire de la Corée, Préface de Christine Shimizu, Edition Le Félin, Paris, 1988.
- L'Inde de l'Islâm, Edition Arthaud, Paris, 1989, 304 p.
- Les Miniatures indiennes, Edition Crémille, Genève, 1989.
- Les Estampes japonaises, en collaboration avec Christine Shimizu, Edition Crémille, Genève, 1990.
- Les Noces indiennes de Râma et Sîtâ ( Le Râmâyana), Edition le Rocher, Paris, 1990.
- A Dictionary of the Martial Art, Éditions Charles E. Tuttle Company Inc., 1991, 288 p.
- Khajurâho, Edition Bordas, Paris, 1991; traduction Dumont, Cologne.
- Les Dieux du bouddhisme, Éditions Flammarion, Paris, 1992, collection « Tout l'Art » réédition 2006, 360 p., traduction New York, 1995).
- L'Art de l'Inde et de l'Asie du Sud-Est, édition Flammarion, Paris,|collection Tout l'art, Paris, 1994, 479 p.
- L'Inde mystique et légendaire, Edition Le Rocher, Paris, 1994.
- Borobudur, photos de Jean Louis Nou, Imprimerie nationale, Paris, 1994; traduction Jaca Books, Milan; Hirmer, Münich, 1995; Abrams, New York, 1996.
- Majestueuse Indonésie, photos De Wilde, Edition Atlas, Paris, 1994.
- L'Arc et la Flèche, Edition le Félin, Paris, 1995.
- Bouddha en son temps, Le Félin, Paris, 1995.
- Inde, vision de lumière, photos de Suzanne Held, Edition Hermé, Paris, 1995.
- Birmanie, vision du Myanmar, photos de Suzanne Held, Edition Hermé, Paris, 1996.
- Histoire de l'Inde et des Indiens, Critérion, coll. « Histoire et histoires », 1996, 816 p.
- Japon. Dictionnaire et civilisation, Éditions Robert Laffont, coll. « Bouquins », Paris, 1996, 1419 p.
