= Japan Encyclopedia =

Japan Encyclopedia (French: Le Japon: Dictionnaire et Civilisation) is an encyclopedia that covers a broad range of topics on Japan.

== History ==
The text was originally published in French as Le Japon: Dictionnaire et Civilisation in 1996, and written by Louis-Frédéric Nussbaum.

The English version was translated by Käthe Roth and published by Harvard University Press in 2002.

== Criticism ==
Both the English and French editions of the work were critically praised. Describing Nussbaum as "one of the greatest experts on Japan", political scientist René Servoise deemed the French original "an excellent dictionary" with a comprehensive scope and "an exceptional bibliography". An equally positive review was published by L'Express. Donald Richie referred to the English edition as "large, beautiful and indispensable" and compared it favorably with the single-volume edition of the Kodansha Encyclopedia of Japan. Peter O'Connor, professor at Musashino University, likewise found the book "a splendid addition to the small but essential body of dictionaries and encyclopedias on Japan", arguing that "this new encyclopedia is just as readable and just as browsable" as the Kodansha Encyclopedia, "and all the more impressive in being the work of a single mind." James Hoare, writing for the journal Asian Affairs, found that among historical and cultural dictionaries of Japan "none covers as much ground as this", despite the presence of a few errors that "do not detract from the overall value of the book."

Roy Andrew Miller, on the other hand, in his 2003 review of the work in the Journal of Asian History, harshly criticized it for its errors, which he concluded were present in the vast majority, if not all, of his sample of several hundred articles. He surmised that many of the errors were rooted in Nihonjinron, speculating that some of the mistakes were mistranslations from the French, and questioned why Harvard University Press would publish such a book, which included misrepresentation of a former Harvard professor, Edwin O. Reischauer.
