= Futaji Irihime =

Legendary Japanese princess and Empress Dowager; wife of Yamato Takeru

Futaji Irihime 両道入姫命

Empress dowager of Japan
- Tenure: appointed in 192
- Spouse: Yamato Takeru
- Issue: Ineyoriwake; Emperor Chūai; Nunoshiirihime; Waketake
- House: Imperial house of Japan
- Father: Emperor Suinin
- Mother: Otokaribatatobe

Futaji Irihime (両道入姫命) was the mother of Emperor Chūai, and wife of Prince Yamato Takeru. She was also appointed empress dowager under the reign of her son, Emperor Chūai.

== Life ==
Futaji Irihime was born the daughter of Emperor Suinin, and a concubine named Otokaribatatobe. She married her nephew, Prince Yamato Takeru and gave him four children, including Emperor Chūai. Emperor Seimu's wife, Oto-takara, bore the emperor one child named Prince Wakanuke. The prince died young however, and Oto-takara did not give birth to any more children. As such, it was decided that Yamato Takeru's son by Futaji Irihime, Prince Tarashinakahiko, would succeed. Prince Tarashinakahiko came to the throne as Emperor Chūai. The Nihon Shoki records that following Emperor Chūai's ascension, his mother was honoured as the empress dowager. However, because Yamato Takeru was not the emperor, Futaji Irihime was never the empress consort. Aside from this, both the Kojiki and Nihon Shoki do not record her accomplishments.

Japanese royalty
Preceded by Yasakairi-hime	Empress dowager of Japan appointed in 192	Succeeded by Nakatsu-hime
