= Himiko =

3rd-century Queen of Yamataikoku

Queen of Yamataikoku
- Reign: c. 190 – 247/248
- Successor: Unknown king
- Born: c. 170 AD
- Died: 247/248 AD
- Burial: Hashihaka Kofun near Nara (proposed)

Himiko (卑弥呼; c. 170–247/248 AD), also known as the Shingi Waō (親魏倭王; "Ruler of Wa, Friend of Wei"), (Note: Middle Chinese pronunciation (ZS): *t͡sʰiɪn-ŋʉi^{H}-ʔuɑ-ɦʉɐŋ; Eastern Han Chinese *tsʰin-ŋui^{C}-ʔuɑi-wɑŋ) (Note: Shin (親), as a prefix, means "friendly to" or "allied to", for example as in shinbei (親米, "pro-America"). Ō (王, "king"), as with other words for rulers in the East Asian cultural sphere, is used gender-neutrally, so Waō (倭王) may be translated specifically as "Queen of Wa".) was a shamaness-queen of Yamatai-koku in Wakoku (倭国). Early Chinese dynastic histories record tributary diplomatic relations between Queen Himiko and the Cao Wei court and state that the Yayoi period people of Wa chose her as ruler following a period of warfare. Early Japanese histories do not mention Himiko, but historians associate her with legendary figures such as Empress Consort Jingū, who is said to have served as regent from 201 to 269.

Scholarly debates over the identity of Himiko and the location of her domain, Yamatai, have raged since the Edo period, with opinions divided between northern Kyūshū or traditional Yamato Province in present-day Kinki. The "Yamatai controversy", writes Keiji Imamura, is "the greatest debate over the ancient history of Japan." Hashihaka Kofun in Nara Prefecture has been proposed by many scholars as a candidate for her burial site.

She has been estimated to have come to power around 190 at about age twenty, and she died in either 247 or 248.

== Biography ==
=== Accession and rule ===
The earliest surviving account of Himiko, in the Book of Wei in the Records of the Three Kingdoms, gives neither her birth date nor her birthplace. It recounts how she was chosen as ruler following years of warfare among the communities of Wa and describes her as mature, without giving her age. Modern historian Christopher Harding estimates that she came to power around 190 CE at about twenty years old.

The Book of Wei describes her religious practice as 鬼道 (kidō in Japanese). Her younger brother assisted her in governing the country. After becoming queen, she was seldom seen and resided in a palace surrounded by towers and stockades that were constantly protected by armed guards. A male palace attendant served her meals and carried messages in and out. Historian Akiko Yoshie argues against treating Himiko as a mere religious figurehead while viewing her brother as the actual ruler, noting that the text describes him as an assistant. Yoshie also emphasizes Himiko's active diplomacy with Wei. In the same account, an official stationed at Ito supervised the polities located north of the queen's domain, and arriving envoys were inspected at the port before diplomatic documents and gifts were forwarded to the queen.

=== Relations with Wei and conflict with Kuna ===
In 238, according to the transmitted text of the Book of Wei, (Note: The transmitted text of the Book of Wei dates this embassy to 238, whereas a quotation of the passage in the Nihon Shoki gives 239; historians Atsushi Nito and Yoshinobu Tsukaguchi have argued for 238 and 239 respectively.) Himiko sent her first recorded embassy, including Nashonmi, to Daifang Commandery on the Korean Peninsula, where the governor arranged an escort to the Cao Wei court. In response, the Wei emperor issued a decree granting her the title "Queen of Wa Friendly to Wei" and awarding her a gold seal with a purple ribbon, while also listing gifts that included one hundred bronze mirrors. A delegation dispatched from Daifang delivered the imperial decree and insignia to Wa in 240, after which Himiko sent a memorial of thanks.

Himiko dispatched another embassy to the Wei court in 243, and in 245 the court issued an imperial decree granting Nashonmi a yellow banner to be presented at Daifang Commandery. In 247, Himiko sent envoys to Daifang to report ongoing fighting with the ruler of Kuna, and the commandery dispatched the official Zhang Zheng to Wa bearing an imperial decree along with the yellow banner intended for Nashonmi.

=== Death and succession ===
Himiko's death is generally dated to 247 or 248; the Book of Wei places the notice after the events of 247 in its narrative without explicitly dating it. The record describes a great mound raised for her burial measuring more than a hundred paces across. Following her death, an unnamed male ruler was placed on the throne, but the people did not accept him and internal fighting resumed until order was restored by installing Himiko's thirteen-year-old relative Iyo (also rendered Toyo) as queen. Iyo subsequently dispatched a delegation of envoys who escorted Zhang Zheng's party on their return journey and presented tribute to the Wei court.

== Historical references ==
The shaman queen Himiko is recorded in various ancient histories, dating back to 3rd-century China, 8th-century Japan, and 12th-century Korea.

=== Chinese sources ===
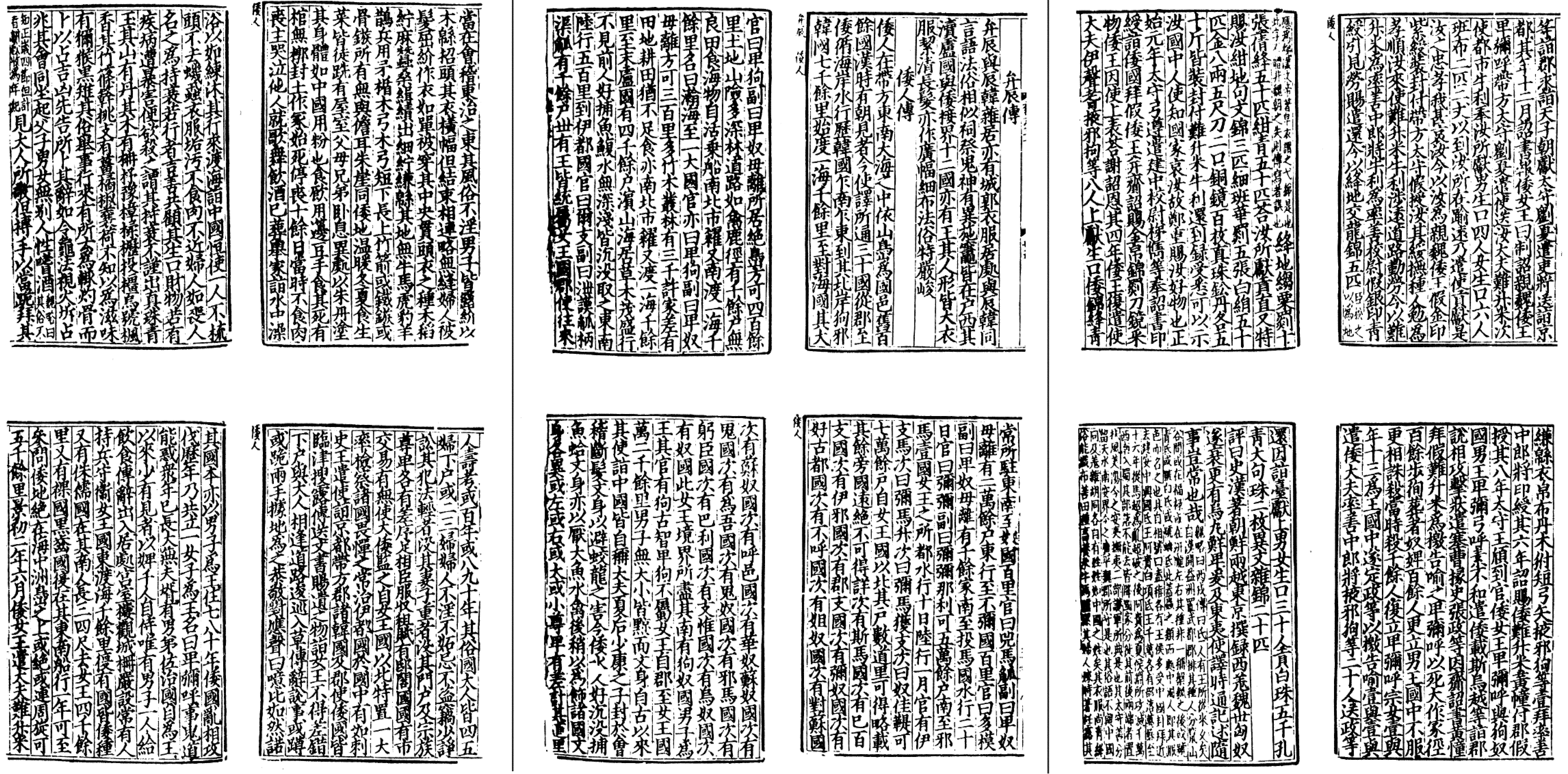
The Wajinden from the Book of Wei (Wei Zhi, 魏志), part of the Records of the Three Kingdoms, c. 297, containing the first mention of Yamatai and Himiko.

The first historical records of Himiko are found in the Records of the Three Kingdoms (Sanguo Zhi), a Chinese classic text dating to c. 297. Japanese scholars excerpted the passages relating to the Wa from volume 30 of the "Book of Wei" (魏書) of the Records and refer to them as the Gishi Wajinden (魏志倭人伝, "Records of Wei: Account of Wajin"). This section is the first description of Himiko and Yamatai:

The people of Wa dwell in the middle of the ocean on the mountainous islands southeast of [the prefecture of] Tai-fang. They formerly comprised more than one hundred communities. During the Han dynasty, [Wa envoys] appeared at the Court; today, thirty of their communities maintain intercourse [with us] through envoys and scribes.

This early history describes how Himiko came to the throne:

The country formerly had a man as ruler. For some seventy or eighty years after that there were disturbances and warfare. Thereupon the people agreed upon a woman for their ruler. Her name was Pimiko. (Note: These quotations retain the romanization Pimiko used in Tsunoda's 1951 translation, rather than the usual modern spelling Himiko. In the history of the Japanese language, word-initial h developed from an earlier labial p through the bilabial fricative ɸ (p → ɸ → h).) She occupied herself with magic and sorcery, bewitching the people. Though mature in age, she remained unmarried. She had a younger brother who assisted her in ruling the country. After she became the ruler, there were few who saw her. She had one thousand women as attendants, but only one man. He served her food and drink and acted as a medium of communication. She resided in a palace surrounded by towers and stockades, with armed guards in a state of constant vigilance.

The "Records of Wei" also records envoys travelling between the Wa and Wei courts. Himiko's emissaries first visited the court of Wei emperor Cao Rui in 238, and he replied:

Herein we address Pimiko, Queen of Wa, whom we now officially call a friend of Wei. […] They have arrived here with your tribute, consisting of four male slaves and six female slaves, together with two pieces of cloth with designs, each twenty feet in length. You live very far away across the sea; yet you have sent an embassy with tribute. Your loyalty and filial piety we appreciate exceedingly. We confer upon you, therefore, the title 'Queen of Wa Friendly to Wei', together with the decoration of the gold seal with purple ribbon. The latter, properly encased, is to be sent to you through the Governor. We expect you, O Queen, to rule your people in peace and to endeavor to be devoted and obedient.

Finally, the "Records of Wei" records that in 247 when a new governor (Note: This governor was Wang Qi; his grandson Wang Mi later became a rebel during the Jin dynasty.) arrived at Daifang Commandery in Korea, Queen Himiko officially complained of hostilities with Himikoko (卑弥弓呼; or Pimikuko), the king of Kuna (ja) (狗奴, literally "dog slave"), one of the other Wa states. The governor dispatched "Chang Chêng, acting Secretary of the Border Guard" with a "proclamation advising reconciliation", and subsequently:

When Pimiko passed away, a great mound was raised, more than a hundred paces in diameter. Over a hundred male and female attendants followed her to the grave. Then a king was placed on the throne, but the people would not obey him. Assassination and murder followed; more than one thousand were thus slain. A relative of Pimiko named Iyo, a girl of thirteen, was [then] made queen and order was restored. Chêng issued a proclamation to the effect that Iyo was the ruler.

Commentators take this 'Iyo' (壹與, with 壹, "one", an old variant of 一) as a miscopy of Toyo (臺與, with 臺 "platform; terrace") paralleling the Wei Zhi writing Yamatai (邪馬臺) as Yamaichi (邪馬壹).

Two other Chinese dynastic histories mentioned Himiko. While both clearly incorporated the Wei Zhi reports, they made some changes, such as specifying the "some seventy or eighty years" of Wa wars occurred between 146 and 189, during the reigns of Han Emperors Huan and Ling. The c. 432 Book of Later Han (Hou Han Shu 後漢書) says "the King of Great Wa resides in the country of Yamadai", rather than the Queen:

The Wa dwell on mountainous islands southeast of Han [Korea] in the middle of the ocean, forming more than one hundred communities. From the time of the overthrow of Chao-hsien [northern Korea] by Emperor Wu (B.C. 140-87), nearly thirty of these communities have held intercourse with the Han [dynasty] court by envoys or scribes. Each community has its king, whose office is hereditary. The King of Great Wa resides in the country of Yamadai.

During the reigns of Huan-ti (147-168) and Ling-ti (168-189), the country of Wa was in a state of great confusion, war and conflict raging on all sides. For a number of years, there was no ruler. Then a woman named Pimiko appeared. Remaining unmarried, she occupied herself with magic and sorcery and bewitched the populace. Thereupon they placed her on the throne. She kept one thousand female attendants, but few people saw her. There was only one man who was in charge of her wardrobe and meals and acted as the medium of communication. She resided in a palace surrounded by towers and stockade, with the protection of armed guards. The laws and customs were strict and stern.

The 636 Book of Sui (Sui Shu) changes the number of Himiko's male attendants:

During the reigns of the Emperors Huan and Ling, that country was in great disorder, and there was no ruler for a period of years. [Then] a woman named Pimiko attracted the populace by means of the practice of magic. The country became unified and made her queen. A younger brother assisted Pimi[ko] in the administration of the country.

Queen [Pimiko] kept one thousand maids in attendance. Her person was seldom seen. She had only two men [attendants]. They served her food and drink and acted as intermediaries.

The Queen lived in a palace, which was surrounded by walls and stockades protected by armed guards; their discipline was extremely strict.

=== Japanese sources ===
Neither of the two oldest Japanese histories – the c. 712 Kojiki nor c. 720 Nihon Shoki – mentions Queen Himiko. The circumstances under which these books were written is a matter of unending debate, and even if Himiko were known to the authors, they may have purposefully decided not to include her. However, they include three legendary imperial-family figures whom later scholars have compared or proposed identifying with her: Princess Yamato-totohi-momoso, the daughter of Emperor Kōrei and aunt of Emperor Sujin; Yamatohime-no-mikoto, the daughter of Emperor Suinin; and Empress Jingū, the wife of Emperor Chūai. The traditional chronology of these figures is not historically established.

One remarkable exception to early Japanese histories overlooking Himiko is the Nihon Shoki, quoting the Wei Zhi three times. In 239, "the queen [女王] of Wa" sent envoys to Wei; in 240, they returned "charged with an Imperial rescript and a seal and ribbon;" and in 243, "the ruler [王 "king"] of Wa again sent high officers as envoys with tribute".

Princess Yamato-totohi-momoso, the shaman aunt of Emperor Sujin, supposedly committed suicide after learning her husband was a trickster snake-god. The Kojiki lists her in Emperor Kōrei's genealogy, but the Nihon Shoki describes her as "the Emperor's aunt by the father's side, a shrewd and intelligent person, who could foresee the future". After a series of national calamities, the Emperor "assembled the 80 myriads of Deities" and inquired by divination. Yamato-totohi-momoso was inspired by Ōmononushi-nushi ("Great Deity of All Deities and Spirits"), to say: "Why is the Emperor grieved at the disordered state of the country? If he duly did us reverent worship it would assuredly become pacified of itself." The Emperor inquired, saying: "What God is it that thus instructs me?" The answer was: "I am the God who dwells within the borders of the land of Yamato, and my name is Oho-mono-nushi no Kami." While imperial worship of this god (from Mount Miwa) was "without effect", Yamato-totohi-momoso later married him.

After this Yamato-toto-hi-momo-so-bime no Mikoto became the wife of Oho-mono-nushi no Kami. This God, however, was never seen in the day-time, but at night. Yamato-toto-hi-momo-so-bime no Mikoto said to her husband: "As my Lord is never seen in the day-time, I am unable to view his august countenance distinctly; I beseech him therefore to delay a while, that in the morning I may look upon the majesty of his beauty." The Great God answered and said: "What thou sayest is clearly right. To-morrow morning I will enter thy toilet-case and stay there. I pray thee be not alarmed at my form." Yamato-toto-hi-momo-so-bime no Mikoto wondered secretly in her heart at this. Waiting until daybreak, she looked into her toilet-case. There was there a beautiful little snake, of the length and thickness of the cord of a garment. Thereupon she was frightened, and uttered an exclamation. The Great God was ashamed, and changing suddenly into human form, spake to his wife, and said: "Thou didst not contain thyself, but hast caused me shame; I will in my turn put thee to shame." So treading the Great Void, he ascended to Mount Mimoro. Hereupon Yamato-toto-hi-momo-so-bime no Mikoto looked up and had remorse. She flopped down on a seat and with a chopstick stabbed herself in the pudenda so that she died. She was buried at Oho-chi. Therefore the men of that time called her tomb the Hashi no haka [Chopstick Tomb].

The Hashihaka Kofun ("chopstick tomb") in Sakurai, Nara is associated with this legend.

Yamatohime-no-mikoto, the daughter of Emperor Suinin, supposedly founded the Ise Shrine to the sun-goddess Amaterasu. The Kojiki records her as the fourth of Suinin's five children, "Her Augustness Yamato-hime, (was the high-priestess of the temple of the Great Deity of Ise)". The Nihon Shoki likewise records "Yamato-hime no Mikoto" and provides more details. The Emperor assigned Yamato-hime to find a permanent location for Amaterasu's shrine, and after wandering for years, the sun-goddess instructed her to build it at Ise "where she first descended from Heaven".

Empress Consort Jingū (or Jingō (神功)) supposedly served as regent after the death of her husband Emperor Chūai (c. 200) until the accession of her son Emperor Ōjin (legendary 15th emperor, r. 270–310). The Kojiki and Nihon Shoki have similar accounts. Emperor Chūai wanted to invade Kumaso, and while he was consulting with his ministers, Jingū conveyed a shamanistic message that he should invade Silla instead. Compare these:

Her Augustness Princess Okinaga-tarashi, was at that time, divinely possessed (Note: The 2008 reprint of Chamberlain adds a footnote after "possessed": "Himeko [sic] in the Chinese historical notices of Japan was skilled in magic, with which she deluded the people.") […] charged him with this instruction and counsel: "There is a land to the Westward, and in that land is abundance of various treasures dazzling to the eye, from gold and silver downwards. I will now bestow this land upon thee." At this time a certain God inspired the Empress and instructed her, saying: "Why should the Emperor be troubled because the Kumaso do not yield submission? It is a land wanting in backbone. Is it worth while raising an army to attack it? There is a better land than this, a land of treasure, which may be compared to the aspect of a beautiful woman – the land of Mukatsu [meaning 'opposite'; 'across'], dazzling to the eyes. In that land there are gold and silver and bright colours in plenty. It is called the Land of Silla of the coverlet of paper-mulberry. If thou worshippest me aright, the land will assuredly yield submission freely, and the edge of thy sword shall not be all stained with blood."

The Emperor thought the gods were lying, said he had only seen ocean to the West, and then died, either immediately (Kojiki) or after invading Kumaso (Nihon Shoki). Jingū allegedly discovered she was pregnant, personally planned and led a successful conquest of Silla, gave birth to the future emperor, and returned to rule Yamato. The Nihon Shoki adds that since Jingū wanted to learn which gods had cursed Chūai, she constructed a shamanic "palace of worship", "discharged in person the office of priest", and heard the gods reveal themselves as coming from Ise (Amaterasu) and Mukatsu (an unnamed Korean divinity). Jingū was formally excluded from the imperial genealogy in 1926, when an imperial rescript described her as Chūai's consort rather than a reigning empress.

=== Korean sources ===
The oldest extant Korean history text, the Samguk Sagi ("Chronicles of the Three [Korean] Kingdoms", completed in 1145), records that Queen Himiko sent an emissary to King Adalla of Silla in May 173.

== Interpretations ==
Researchers have struggled to reconcile accounts of Himiko between Chinese and Japanese historical sources. While the Wei Zhi described her as an important ruler in 3rd-century Japan, the Nihon Shoki does not name Himiko even when quoting the Wei Zhi on envoys from Wa, an omission that Laura Miller interprets as deliberate.

=== Name ===
The historical Chinese transcription of her name is 卑彌呼 (modern Japanese form 卑弥呼), read Himiko in modern Japanese. Jeffrey L. Richey romanizes the name as bēimíhū and Andrew Jones uses bìmíhū. Taken individually, the characters have literal meanings such as 卑 'low, humble', 彌 (弥) 'extend', and 呼 'call, shout'.

In historical Chinese phonology, scholars have represented the pronunciation of the characters across differing historical stages and notation systems (卑, 彌, and 呼, respectively):

- Karlgren's Middle Chinese (as used by Miller): pjiḙ, mjiḙ, χuo.
- Karlgren's system as modified by Li Fang-kuei (Qieyun): pjie^{4}, mjie^{4}, xuo.
- Baxter–Sagart Middle Chinese notation: pjie, mjie, xu.
- Pulleyblank Early Middle Chinese, with Qieyun distinctions: pjiə̆, mjiə̆, xɔ.
- Pulleyblank Early Middle Chinese, later seventh-century stage: pji, mji, xɔ.
- Schuessler Late Han Chinese (selected forms): pie, mie, hɑ.

In Japanese phonology, modern word-initial /h/ developed from an earlier phonetic bilabial fricative [ɸ] and originally from *p (*p > [ɸ] > /h/). J. Edward Kidder writes that the archaic Japanese pronunciation of the name was probably close to Pimeko. Roy Andrew Miller criticizes the supposed Old Japanese lexical form *Fimeko as a lexicographic error, arguing that it was a dictionary creation derived from the Wei Zhi transcription:

Most perplexing of the entire list is the name of the queen of the Yeh-ma-t'ai community, Pi-mi-hu, Middle Chinese pjiḙ-mjiḙ-χuo. This has traditionally been explained and understood in Japan as a transcription of a supposed Old Japanese form *Fimeko, said to be an early term meaning "high born woman; princess," and to derive from Old Japanese Fime (also sometimes Fimë), a laudatory title for women going with Fiko for men. Later Fime comes to mean "princess," but this meaning is anachronistic for the earlier texts. […] The difficulty concerns the supposed Old Japanese word *Fimeko. Even though such a form has found its way into a few modern Japanese dictionaries (for example even Kindaichi's otherwise generally reliable Jikai), it is in fact simply one of the ghost words of Japanese lexicography; when it does appear in modern lexical sources, it is a "made-up" form listed there solely on the basis of the Wei chih account of early Japan. There never was an Old Japanese *Fimeko; furthermore, the Middle Chinese spirant χ of the transcription suggests that the final element of the unknown original term did not correspond to Old Japanese -ko, which is rendered elsewhere—in Fiko, for example—with Middle Chinese -k- as one would expect. The final element of this transcription, then, remains obscure, though there is certainly a good chance that the first portion does correspond to a form related to Old Japanese Fime. Beyond that, it is at present impossible to go.

— Roy Andrew Miller, 1967:22

Miller notes a commonly proposed derivation of the older form Fime (later hime, 姫, 'princess') from Fi (日, 'sun') and me (女, 'woman').

Tsunoda notes that "Pimiko is from an archaic Japanese title, himeko, meaning 'princess'". Barbara Ambros notes that the name has been interpreted as corresponding to possible titles resembling hime-miko, hi-miko, or hi-meko, which have been variously associated with royal lineage, shamanic function, or a solar cult.

Bentley considers the Baekje word *pye, 'west', the honorific prefix *me and *hɔ, 'heir', and thus interprets 卑彌呼 as 'the honorific heir of the west'.

=== Identity and historicity ===
The 3rd-century Chinese Wei Zhi ("Records of Wei") describes shaman Queen Himiko and her exchange of envoys with the Wei court. The 8th-century Japanese Kojiki and Nihon Shoki do not name Himiko (though the Nihon Shoki quotes the Wei Zhi in its account of Jingū). Arai Hakuseki proposed equating Himiko with Empress Jingū, while later scholars have compared her with Yamatohime-no-mikoto and Yamato-totohi-momoso-hime.

Comparing these figures with the Chinese account depends on the chronological model used. Scholars date Himiko's death to around 248 on the basis of the Wei Zhi. While traditional Japanese dating places Empress Jingū in the 3rd century, Naka Michiyo's adjusted chronology shifts Jingū's reign into the 4th century, and Kidder instead places Yamato-totohi-momoso-hime within a 3rd-century time bracket.

William Wayne Farris reviews the history of scholarly debates over Himiko and her domain Yamatai. The Edo-period philosophers Arai Hakuseki and Motoori Norinaga began the controversies over whether Yamatai was located in Northern Kyushu or Yamato Province in the Kinki region of central Honshū and whether the Wei Zhi or the Nihon Shoki was historically more trustworthy. The Confucianist scholar Arai Hakuseki accepted the Wei Zhi account, equated Himiko with Jingū, and initially located Yamatai in Yamato before later proposing Chikugo Province in Kyushu. The kokugaku scholar Motoori Norinaga doubted the reliability of the Wei Zhi details and hypothesized that people from southern Kyushu, such as the Kumaso, had sent unofficial envoys pretending to represent Jingū. Farris states that "Motoori's usurpation hypothesis (gisen setsu) carried great weight for the next century."

In the Wei Zhi itinerary, Yamatai is distinguished from Nakoku (Na), which has been located near present-day Hakata in northern Kyūshū and received a gold seal from Emperor Guangwu of the Han dynasty in 57. Kidder notes Nakayama Heijirō's hypothesis that a conflict occurred between Na and Yamatai prior to Himiko's rule. The Wei Zhi records that Himiko was in conflict with Kunakoku, whose king was Himikuko. Shiratori Kurakichi proposed associating Kunakoku with the Kumaso.

Naka Michiyo believed the Nihon Shoki chronology was inaccurate prior to the 4th century, and thus "Jingū became a fourth-century queen whose reign could not possibly have coincided with Himiko's." The sinologist Shiratori Kurakichi regarded Himiko as a religious ruler and rejected equating her with Jingū. Naitō Torajirō identified Himiko with Yamatohime-no-mikoto, an Ise priestess.

One scholar [Higo Kazuo] asserted that Himiko was really Yamato-toto-momo-so-hime-no-mikoto, aunt of the legendary Emperor Sūjin on his father's side, because her supposed tomb at Hashihaka in Nara measured about a hundred paces in diameter, the measurement given for Himiko's grave. This theory gained adherents in the postwar period. Another [Shida Fudomaru] saw in Himiko an expression of women's political authority in early Japan.

Some later Japanese historians analyzed the society described in the Wei Zhi account through the framework of Marxist historiography. William Wayne Farris summarizes Masaaki Ueda as arguing that Himiko's polity was a despotic state with a generalized slave system. Inoue Mitsusada argued that Himiko was chosen by multiple Wa polities rather than by Kinki or Yamatai alone, reflecting a less centralized political structure. A late 1960s "Yamatai boom" followed popular publications in 1967 and 1968 by Miyazaki Kōhei and the mystery writer Matsumoto Seichō, alongside numerous studies of Himiko and Yamatai by historians, linguists, and archaeologists.

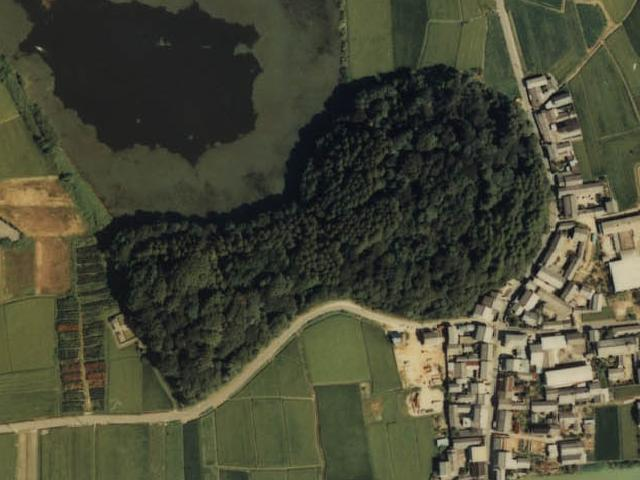
Aerial view of the Hashihaka Kofun. Made based on National Land Image Information (Color Aerial Photographs), Ministry of Land, Infrastructure, Transport and Tourism

In Japanese historical and archeological periodization, the 2nd- and 3rd-century era of Queen Himiko was between late Yayoi period and early Kofun period. The Wei Zhi account of Himiko's burial states that "a great mound was raised, more than a hundred paces in diameter". Archaeological excavations of early Kofun sites in the Kinki region, such as the Kurozuka and Tenjinyama tombs, have uncovered bronze mirrors, including triangular-rimmed mirrors decorated with gods and animals (shinju-kyo) at Kurozuka. Scholars debate whether these mirrors correspond to the "one hundred bronze mirrors" that the Wei Zhi records Emperor Cao Rui presented to Himiko. The Hashihaka Kofun in Sakurai, Nara was given a recent boost by radio-carbon dating circa 240–60. Conditional on identifying Himiko with Jingū or her era, Robert S. Ellwood interpreted her figure in relation to religious changes seen as a "patriarchal revolution" replacing female deities and priestesses with male counterparts. Mori Kōichi compared the joint rule of Himiko and her younger brother to early imperial patterns of tandem rule by a female shaman and a male secular leader. As summarized by J. Edward Kidder, Seichō Matsumoto understood Himiko's religious role as acting on behalf of her group in dealings with the spirit world.

In a separate debate concerning the legend of Empress Jingū rather than the historical Himiko, Toshio Akima notes that the Jingū narrative of a conquest of Korea was used to justify Japan's colonization of Korea.

== Modern depictions ==
Depictions of Himiko in Japanese popular media include archetypes such as Himiko as a wise, old priestess; Himiko as an adorable shrine attendant; or Himiko as a seductive sorceress. Modern representations depict her with several ritual objects, including dotaku (Yayoi-period bronze bells), the sakaki branch, and Chinese bronze mirrors. The Wei Zhi uses the term guidao (Japanese kidō), which generally refers to Daoist folk practices, to describe Himiko's practices. Some modern depictions interpret this negatively as black magic, while others portray her more positively. Because she ruled in the transitional period between the Yayoi and Kofun eras, depictions of Himiko often display her wearing clothing originating from a variety of time periods. A queen during the late Yayoi, Himiko likely wore a one-piece, wide-sleeved kosode under a vest and sash. She is also often depicted wearing magatama beads and a diadem. However, no one can be certain what Himiko wore.

=== Town mascots ===
Himiko's legend has been used to market a variety of objects. Various small towns seek to use Himiko as their mascot, claiming their town as her birthplace, although the archaeological evidence supports regions in the Nara basin as her capital. Yoshinogari in Saga Prefecture and Sakurai City in Nara prefecture both employ images of Himiko to attract tourists, with Sakurai using a cute city mascot, Himiko-chan, on signs welcoming visitors.

=== Himiko contests ===
In the Queen Himiko contests documented by Laura Miller in 2014, entrants were judged on charm and appearance, cash prizes were usual, and most competitions she described were open to women over the age of eighteen. One of the earliest of these contests began in Yamatokoriyama in Nara. Another contest, Himikon, was held in Moriyama City, and Asakura in Kyushu also held a Himiko contest during its Yamataikoku Festival of Flowers.

== Namesake ==
The proper name Himiko has been used in modern Japanese transport and astronomy. The Amagi Railway railcar AR401 formerly carried the nickname Himiko (卑弥呼). The water bus Himiko (ヒミコ) is operated by Tokyo Cruise Ship and was designed by Leiji Matsumoto.

In 2009, researchers reported the discovery of Himiko, a large Lyman-alpha blob (a massive cloud of hydrogen gas) named after the queen. Located 12.9 billion light years away in the direction of the constellation Cetus, it was described by the discovery team as unusually large for that early epoch of the universe.

The one million dollar filly of 2015 American Triple Crown winner American Pharoah and Untouched Talent (mother of 2012 Kentucky Derby second Bodemeister) was named Himiko.

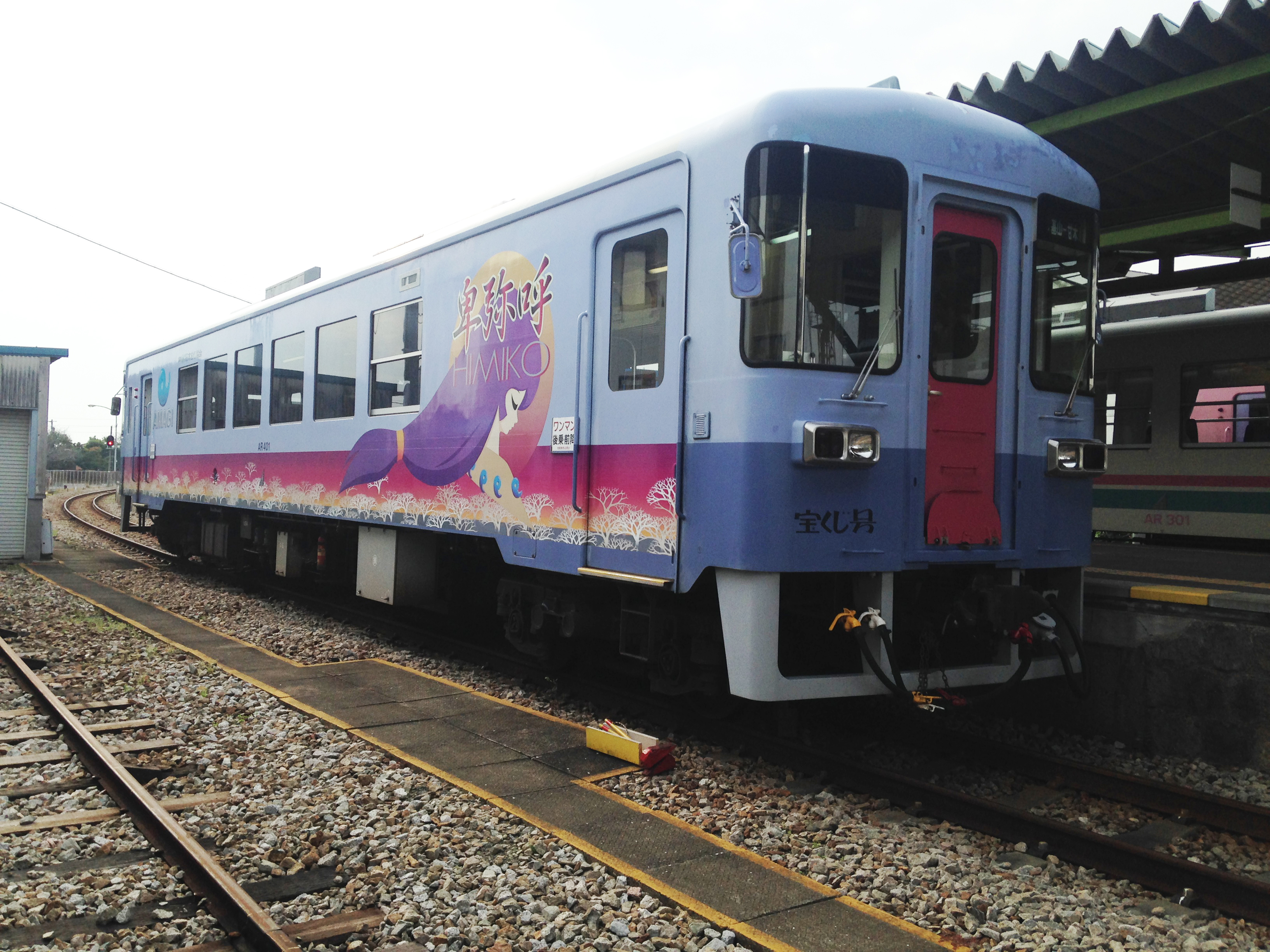
Amagi Railway AR401 at Amagi Station

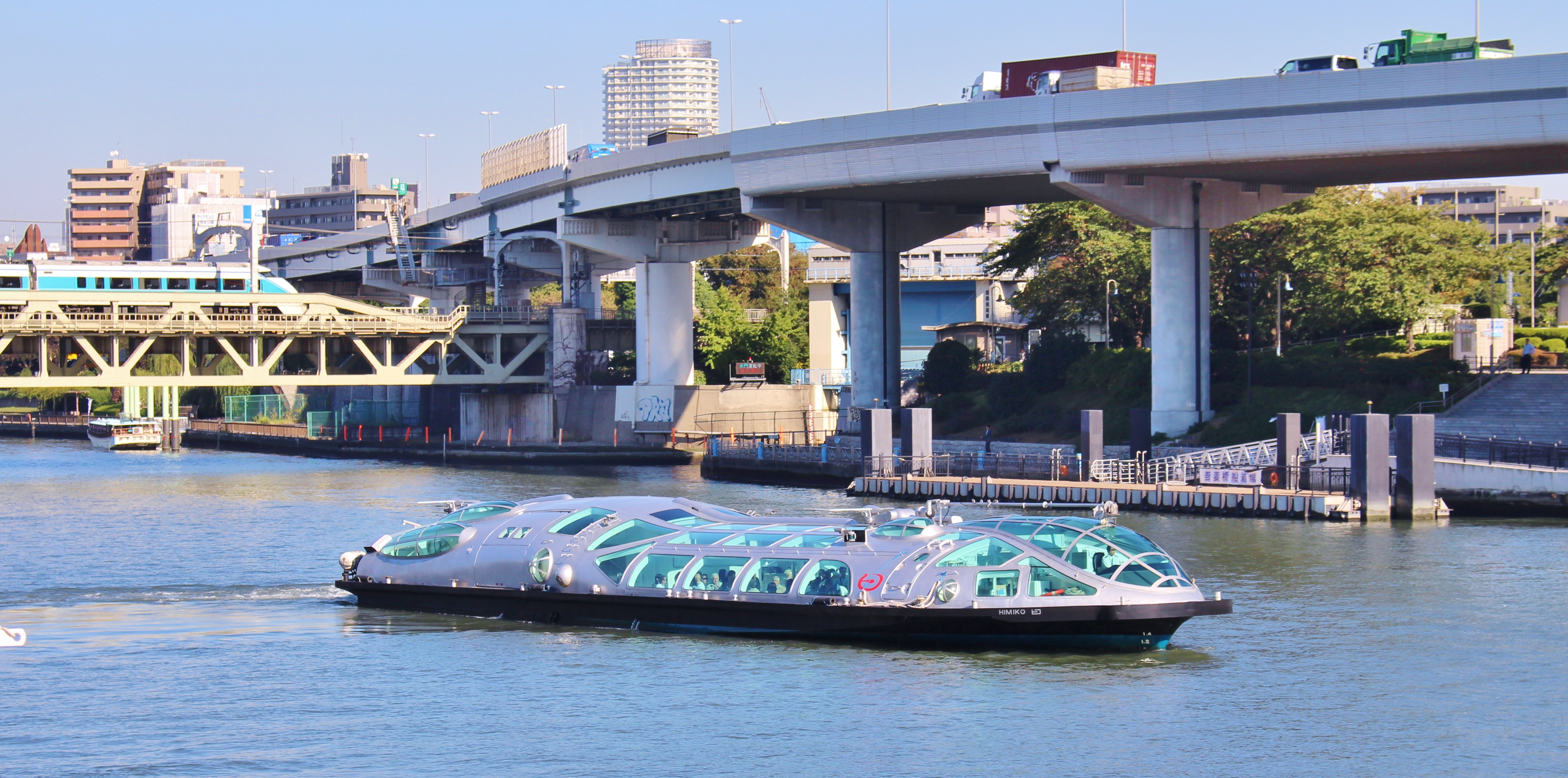
The water bus Himiko on the Sumida River

== See also ==
- Empress Jingu
- List of female castellans in Japan
- Onna-musha
