= Kukochihiko =

Official of the Kununokuni

Kukochihiko (狗古智卑狗) as described in the Wajinden was an official of the Kununokuni and a described as the real power behind the government there.

The original text of Wajinden reads.

其南有狗奴國 男子爲王 其官有狗古智卑狗 不属女王

== Various theories ==
- Since the Wamyō Ruijushō is written as "Kikuchi", it is thought that Kikuchi-jibei dog is "Kikuchihiko" (Japanese) and is associated with Kumamoto Prefecture Kikuchi-gun.。
- Since his name is written before Himikoko it is theorized he had the true power in Kununokuni
- Some think that the derogatory meaning is removed from the official name. The word "狗" is fierce, and is thought to be "commitment (建, Takeru; タケル)," meaning a heroic and brave man. Kochi (古智)" means "old wisdom," but the opposite of "new (古い, Furui)" is "New (新しい, Atarashii)," and it is thought to be originally "New wisdom (新しい知恵, Atarashii Chie). The word "(卑狗)" is "Hiko," which is thought to be "Prince (彦)" or "High sun (日高)" or "Sun child (日子)".

== In popular culture ==
Kukochihiko is a character in Fate/Grand Order. In it he is depicted as a villain who overthrew Himikoko and conquered Kununokuni, and attempted to conquer Yamatai.

== See also ==
- Himikoko
- Kununokuni
