= Yamatohime-no-mikoto =

Japanese figure, daughter of Emperor Suinin

Yamatohime-no-mikoto 倭比売命 or 倭姫命
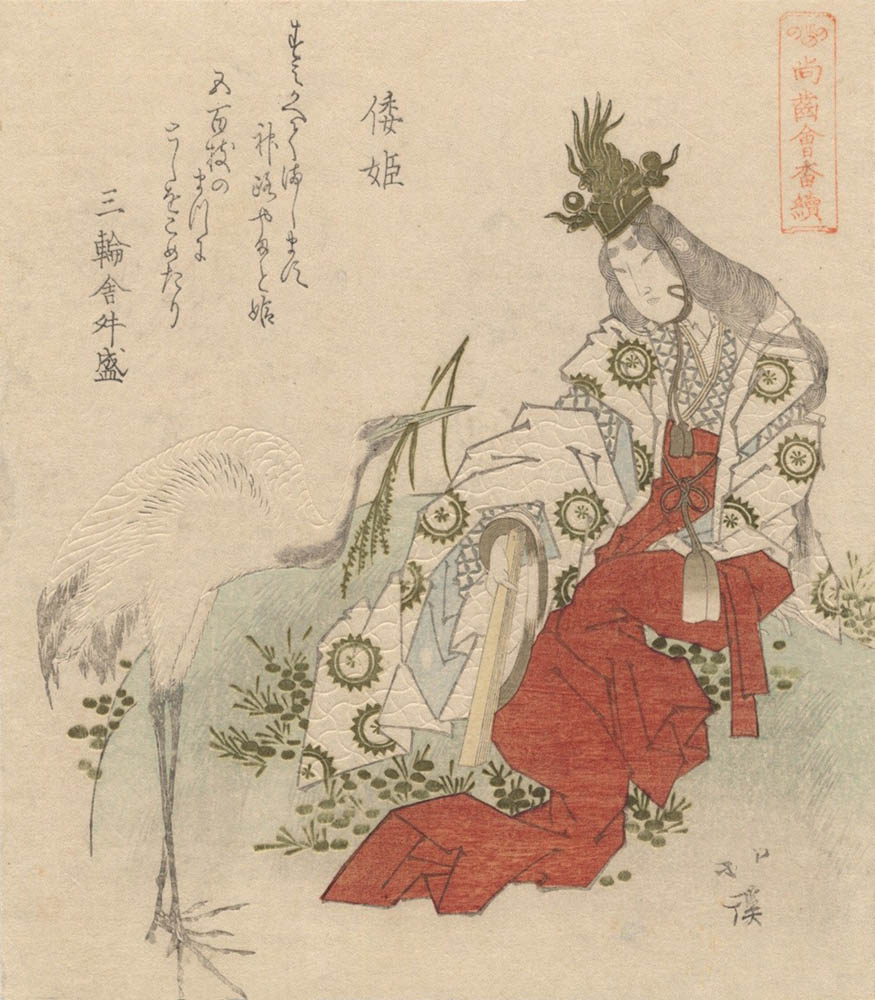
- A painting of Yamato hime by Totoya Hokkei

Saiō
- Predecessor: Position established (Note: Toyosukiirihime worshipped at Ise Jingū before Yamatohime-no-mikoto according to the Kojiki. However she is not considered the first Saiō, with Ise Jingū preferring to use the Nihon Shoki's version of events.)
- Successor: Princess Iyono (Note: Princess Yamatohime is generally considered to be the first Saiō according to tradition with Princess Ōku being the first saiō after the establishment of the Saikū. However Princess Iyono pre-dates Ōku as the saiō.)
- Died: after the 40th year of Emperor Keikō's reign (supposedly hundreds of years old)
- Burial: Ujiyamada mausoleum (Note: There's multiple places she's considered to be buried. But Ujiyamada mausoleum is the most accepted answer.)
- House: Imperial house of Japan
- Father: Emperor Suinin
- Mother: Hibasu-hime

Yamatohime-no-mikoto (倭比売命 or 倭姫命) (Note: Yamatohime is the figure's name; no-mikoto is an honorific applied to the names of nobles or gods.) is a Japanese figure who is said to have established Ise Shrine, where the goddess of the sun, Amaterasu, is enshrined. Yamatohime-no-mikoto is recorded as being the daughter of Emperor Suinin, Japan's 11th emperor.

== Traditional historical view ==
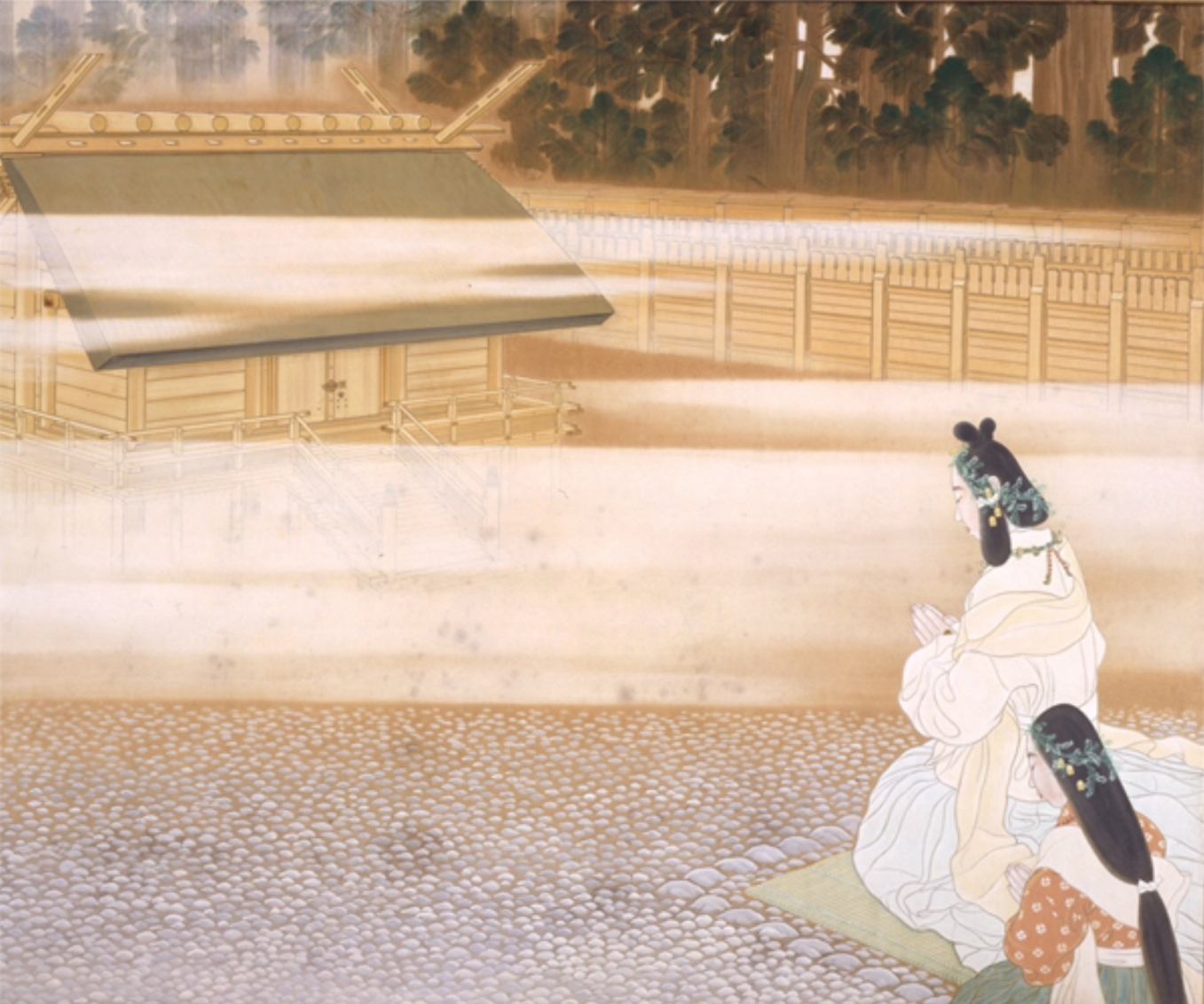
Princess Yamatohime praying

Legend says that about 2,000 years ago, Emperor Suinin ordered his daughter, Princess Yamatohime-no-mikoto, to set out and find a suitable permanent location from which to hold ceremonies for Amaterasu Ōmikami. Prior to this, Amaterasu Ōmikami had been worshiped within the Imperial Palace at Yamato, before a temporary location was created in the eastern Nara Basin. Yamatohime-no-mikoto is said to have set out from Mt. Miwa and wandered for 20 years through the regions of Ōmi and Mino in search of a suitable location.

The shrines she and her sister Toyosukiirihime brought Amaterasu through until Ise are called Moto-Ise Shrines

When she arrived at Ise, she is said to have heard the voice of Amaterasu Ōmikami saying that she wanted to live forever in the richly abundant area of Ise, near the mountains and the sea, and it was here that Yamatohime-no-mikoto established Naiku, the Inner Shrine.

Jien records that during the reign of Emperor Suinin, the first High Priestess (Saiō, also known as saigū) was appointed to serve at Ise Shrine.

Later, during the reign of Emperor Keikō, she gave her dress then holy sword Kusanagi-no-tsurugi to Yamato Takeru.

== Alternate historical perspectives ==
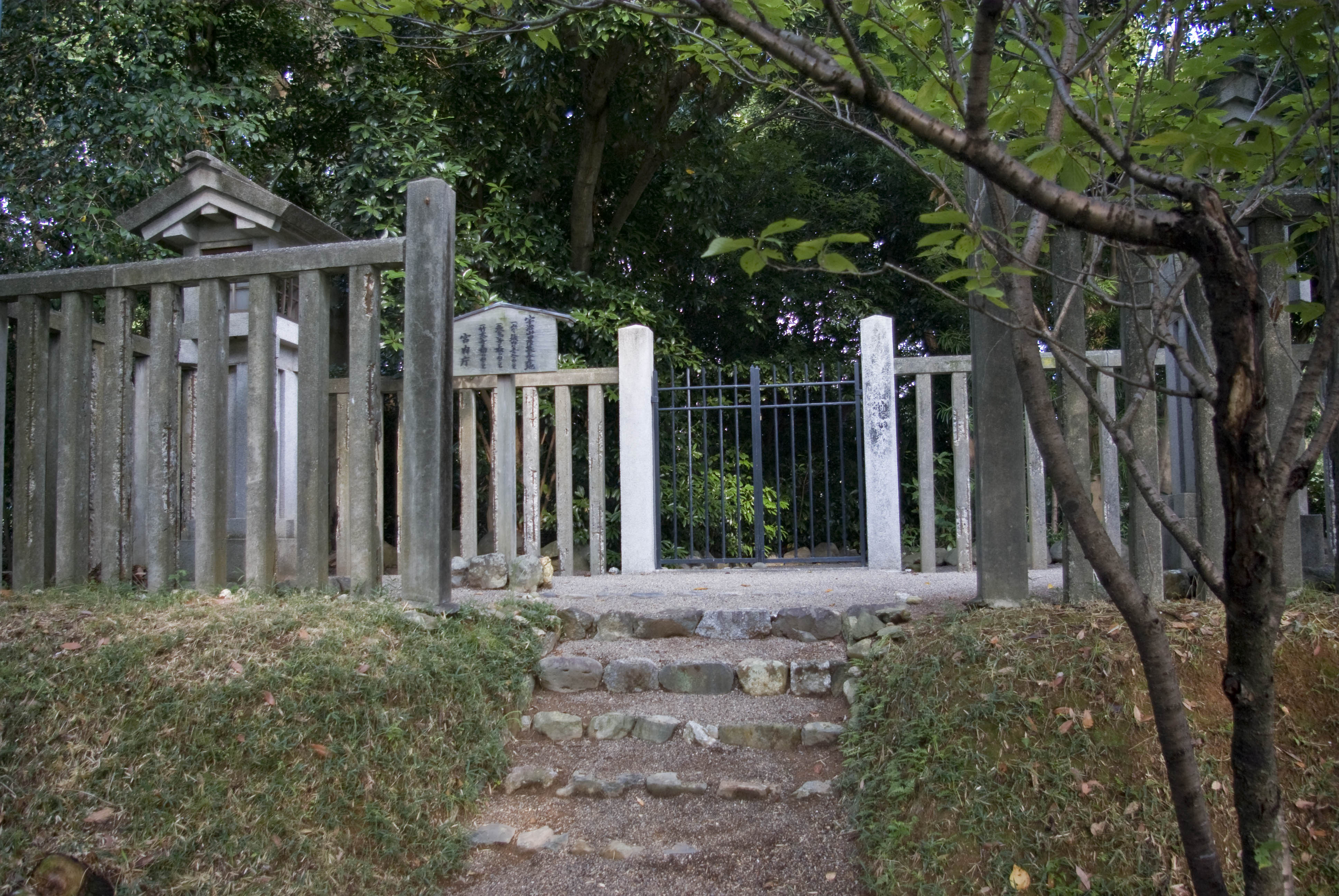
The legendary burial ground of Yamatohime-no-mikoto near Ise Shrine designated by the Imperial Household Agency

Some sources point out the parallels between Yamatohime-no-mikoto and Queen Himiko, a female ruler of Japan referred to in 3rd-century Chinese sources, namely the Records of Three Kingdoms and the Wajinden. Himiko was recorded as an unmarried queen and priestess, whose name means "sun child", or "sun daughter". Parallels can be drawn between Yamatohime-no-mikoto's role as both princess and priestess and the descriptions of Himiko, as well as the meaning of Himiko's name and that of the role of Yamatohime-no-mikoto as priestess and descendant of the sun goddess, or "daughter of the sun". Queen Himiko is recorded as having ruled the land of "Yamatai", whereas Yamatohime-no-mikoto left her home of Yamato to establish Ise Shrine.

The nature of Queen Himiko has been a point of great debate since the late Edo period, with other theories linking her with Empress Jingū or even a real person upon whom the myth of the sun goddess Amaterasu was built. As the earliest extant Japanese sources of information about Yamatohime-no-mikoto date from the Kojiki in the early 8th century, it remains difficult to see how the historical figure of Yamatohime-no-mikoto can be delineated in fuller depth or with a sense of better verified accuracy.

== Ceremonies ==
A Shinto ceremony is conducted on May 5 and November 5 each year at the sanctuary of Yamatohime-no-miya, near Ise Shrine, to celebrate the contribution of Yamatohime-no-mikoto in the establishment of the shrine.

== See also ==
- Saiō
