= Toyosukiirihime =

Japanese princess

Toyosukiirihime 豊鍬入姫命
- House: Imperial House of Japan
- Father: Emperor Sujin
- Mother: Tootsuayumemagwashihime
- Religion: Shinto

Toyosukiirihime (豊鍬入姫命) was a Japanese princess and daughter of Emperor Sujin.

== Life ==
According to tradition, both Toyosukiirihime and Yamatohime-no-mikoto are considered to be the origins of the role of saiō and Ise Shrine. In the Kojiki, Toyosukiirihime is considered the first maiden of the Ise Shrine, with Yamatohime-no-mikoto succeeding her.

The Nihon Shoki however states that originally, Toyosukiirihime was entrusted with finding a place to worship Amaterasu. But unlike the Kojiki, Toyosukiirihime does not end up finishing the task, as Yamatohime-no-mikoto takes over and goes travelling across Japan.

The Nihon Shoki's account is the accepted version, and is the version of events that Ise Shrine promotes today as opposed to the Kojiki.
