= Harima no Inabi no Ōiratsume =

Harima no Inabi no Ōiratsume 播磨稲日大郎姫

Empress consort of Japan
- Tenure: 72 – 122
- Died: 122
- Spouse: Emperor Keikō
- Issue: Prince Kushitsunowake; Prince Ōsu; Yamato Takeru
- Father: Wakatakehiko

Harima no Inabi no Ōiratsume (播磨稲日大郎姫) was the first wife of Emperor Keikō and Empress of Japan from the year 72 until her death in 122.

== Life ==
The Empress bore the Emperor three sons, including Yamato Takeru. According to tradition, her father is the ancestor of the Kibi clan. Little information exists about her, as with most Empress Consorts. She simply serves as a name for the genealogy. The Empress died in 122, and soon after her husband remarried to Yasakairi-hime.

== Notes ==
Japanese royalty
Preceded by Hibasu-hime	Empress consort of Japan; 72–122	Succeeded by Yasakairi-hime
