= Kununokuni =

Historical Japanese country

Kununokuni (狗奴国)(Kunu no kuni/kunukoku Kuna no Kuni/Kunakoku Konanokuni / Konakoku) was a Japanese country that was in conflict with Yamatai, which is mentioned in the "Wajinden" in the "Book of Wei" portion of the Chinese history book "Records of the Three Kingdoms" (Sanguozhi) by Chen Shou of the Western Jin Dynasty, which recorded the history of the Three Kingdoms period.

== Outline ==
Wakoku in the 3rd century, located in the south where Yamataikoku ends. Its name suggests that it was originally a branch of Nakoku. There is also a Shiga Island. As the knob on the gold seal excavated on Shika Island was a Snake, Nukuni was a nation of tribes that believed in dragons and snakes (Sea People (Japan), broadly speaking Yayoi people), whereas Nukuni was named after a tribe of people who believed in the dog-wolf religion (Jomon people). In fact, the Ngu-barking, Inu-mai and Tsukiboshi beliefs were prominent in southern Kyushu.

There was a male king Himikoko, and his official was Kukochihiko. Himiko, the queen of Yamatai, and Himikoko were in a state of battle, saying that they were "not at peace from the bare minimum", and it was during this battle that Himiko died.

Hisao Houga explains that the "kuma" of Kumaso represents the totem of "bear" (熊), and that the Habaku Kumawashi eagle and others who fought against Jingō are the names of the "bear" and "eagle" or the ".... The eagle is strong and healthy. He also has wings on his body, and flies well and high...". The theory that he was a descendant of the Itokoku royal family and the Imperial family was also proposed. He also refuted the theory of Tsuda Yokichi and others, and assumed that Gūnakuni represented the totem of the "dog" and was the land of the Jōmon people, who believed in the dog-wolf and had a legend of the ancestors of the dog-wolf beast. The Hayato, meaning "barkers" (people who bark like dogs), advocated that the descendants of the Nigunokuni were the Hayato people.

== Theories on location ==
In both cases, the place names "Kuno (久野)" or "Kuno (久能)" are found all over the country, so it is meaningless to search for a candidate location in Gunnu Province based on place names alone.

=== Zainan theory ===
There are three theories depending on interpretation.

1. The theory that interprets the description in Wei-Zhi-Wa-jin-Den that Gu-no-Kuni was south of "the end of the queen's boundary" as being in the south from the countries centering on Yamataikoku.
2. The theory that interprets the description of Nukuni as being located "south of Nukuni" from the fact that Nukuni is the last of the 21 countries listed in the "Queen's Boundary Ends" section of Wei Zhi-Wa-jin Den.
3. The theory that it was located "south of the Queen Country" from the fact that "Wei Oyaku" says "south of the Queen".

The theory of "Southern Kyushu" is based on the fact that the "Wei Oryaku" says "south of the Queen Country", which means that it was located "south of the Queen Country".

- Southern Kyushu theory
  - Higo theory: Until recently, this was the most major theory, regardless of the Kyushu or Kinai theory of the Yamataikoku. It is still the prevailing theory today. Higo Province Kuma County is a relic of Kumakuni, or Kumano-Agata in the Chronicles, and is designated as Gu-nu-kuni, and Kikuchi County in the same country is associated with Kukochi-hitogu. Naitō Konan also identified the Ngunu Province as Higo Province, and its center as Jōno Township, Kikuchi-gun.
  - Other Southern Kyushu theories: various locations in Southern Kyushu. This is the case of the "Evil Kyushu" theory, which compares the location of Gunnu Province to one of the places in Southern Kyushu. Many theories have weak similarity of place names.
- Kumano theory. The Kumano theory is based on the theory that the Kumano region is located south of the Nara Basin in the Kinai theory of the Yamataikoku (Shida Fudomaro, Kasai Shin'ya, etc.).

=== The theory of Zaitō ===
There are two theories, one according to Sanguozhi and the other according to the Book of the Later Han.

1. The theory according to the Book of the Later Han: Although Wei Zhi/Wei Biographies identifies "eastward across the sea, there is another country, Minna Waju" and "Gu-nu-koku" as different, it assumes Gu-nu-koku to the east, not south, as the Gohanshu Dongyiden identifies the two, which is somewhat weak from a literary criticism point of view.
2. This theory assumes that the direction of the Wei biography is tilted 90 degrees, and reads all south as east. In this case, it is assumed that Gu-nu-no-kuni was located to the east of Yabatai-kuni.
3. The theory interprets Nguni Province to be located "south of Nguni Province," which is "where the boundary of the queen ends," rather than "south of Yabataikoku," from the Wei-Zhi-Wa-jin-den, and puts it in the east. (Since the direction of "where the boundary of the queen ends" is not specified, it can also be interpreted as east.)
- Shikoku theory: This theory is based on the theory of the Kyushu region of Yamataikoku.
  - Iyo theory: Motoori Norinaga compared it to Kazahaya County Kono Township in Iyo Province.
  - Sanuki theory: Takehiko Furuta identifies Takehiko Furuta as a "Kununokuni province" in the Seto Inland Sea. The Kinki theory: argued by Takehiko Furuta and others in his later years, the author of the Kinki theory and some Kyushu theorists.
- The Kinki theory: argued by Takehiko Furuta and others in his later years, as well as by the Kibi theory of the Yamataikoku and some Kyushu theorists.
- Izumo theory: The Yamataikoku was located in Kyushu.
- The other theories have been attracting attention since the 1980s and are more recent and influential.
  - The Omi theory is based mainly on archaeological evidence and is centered on Omi and includes parts of Mino.
  - Ohari theory: Centered on Owari, including parts of Ise and parts of Mino. The Aichi Prefecture Ichinomiya City and other Ise Bay sites, where large numbers of S-shaped jars have been excavated, suggest that Ise Bay may have been the site of large, backward-facing, square mound tombs, Nōbi Plain. Some people also associate it with the place name "Kano" in Gifu City, located at the northern edge of the Nōbi Plain, and "Kuwana" in Kuwana City, Mie Prefecture, which is adjacent to the western edge of the Nōbi Plain. (This power was later considered to be the forerunner of the forces in eastern Japan that built forward-backward burial mounds in the first half of the Kofun era).(There is also a Omi theory).
  - Tōmi theory: The western part of Shizuoka Prefecture is considered to be the center of the Nuku-no-kuni. Some consider Shizuoka Prefecture's western part (Omi) to be the center of Gnu-no-kuni (some consider the eastern part of Suruga to be included).
  - Kanto theory: Identifies the Kununokuni Province as Mono Province (Gunma Prefecture and Tochigi Prefecture).

== Theories about the descendants ==
Just as there are various theories about the relationship between Yamato Kingship and the Yamatai, there are also conflicting theories about what happened to the Kununokuni Kingdom afterwards.

- Theory of extinction (lost in war to the Yamataikoku and perished)
- Absorption theory (Himiko was integrated into the Yabataikoku federation shortly after her death and gradually absorbed)
- Inheritance theory (a Kununokuni state that existed somewhere else continued to exist as a local power)
- Hayato/Kumaso theory (The Nguni nation in Kyushu became Kumaso or Hayato)
- Theory that the Yamato kingdom became the Yamato kingdom
- Conquest theory (the "Gunokoku" that existed somewhere destroyed the "Yamataikoku" that existed somewhere and became the Yamato kingdom)
- Theory of the eastward migration of the Yamato kingdom (the Nuku-no-kuni from Kyushu conquered the Yamataikoku in the Kinai region and became the Yamato kingdom).
- Fugitive theory (The Yamato kingdom fled from the oppression of the Yamataikoku coalition in Kyushu, moved to the Kinai region, and became the Yamato kingdom)

== The period in which the Kununokuni Kingdom existed ==
- Yayoi Era

== See also ==
- Chinese literature related to Wajin
- Wajinden
- Yamatai
