= Takahashi Ujibumi =

Japanese clan record

Takahashi Ujibumi (高橋氏文) is a historical Japanese clan record of the Takahashi clan. It served as an appeal for court arbitration between two fighting clans.

The author(s) is unknown, but the contents suggest that it was composed prior to 789 AD. The text only survives today in fragments quoted in other texts, such as Honchō Gatsuryō (本朝月令, c. 930-946), Seiji Yōryaku (政事要略, 1002), and Nenjū Gyōji Hishō (年中行事秘抄).

Both the Takahashi and Azumi clans served in the Royal Table Office. Conflict between the two clans erupted with many conflicts occurring after 716 AD. Seeking arbitration and a resolution to the conflict, both clans submitted their clan records to the imperial court. This is the Takahashi record; the Azumi clan record is unknown.

== Contents ==
Pieced together, the text consists of three major sections:

- Takahashi clan ancestor Iwakamutsukari no Mikoto served Emperor Keikō meals and received the title "Kashiwade" (chief).
- The imperial proclamation after Iwakamutsukari died.
- A record of the 792 arbitration by the Department of State regarding the conflicts between the two clans.

== Value ==
The text is highly valued as the oldest existing clan record. In addition, the Nihon Shoki (720) makes reference to the Kashiwade clan, a title bestowed up the Takahashi clan. This suggests the possibility that the Takahashi clan record, at least in part, was used as a reference in compiling Nihon Shoki while also suggesting that parts of it may be even older.

Linguistically, the text includes a number of passages utilizing the archaic Jōdai Tokushu Kanazukai spellings. However, there are some inconsistencies which indicate that parts of it date to a late 8th century.

== See also ==
- Historiography of Japan
