= Mimaki-hime =

Legendary empress consort of Japan

Mimaki-hime 御間城姫

Empress consort of Japan
- Tenure: 97–29 BC

Empress dowager of Japan
- Tenure: appointed in 29 BC
- Spouse: Emperor Sujin
- Issue: Emperor Suinin; Izanomawaka; Kunikatahime; Chijitsukuyamatohime; Igahime; Yamatohiko
- Father: Prince Ōhiko

Mimaki-hime (御間城姫) was the legendary empress consort of Japan from 97 BC to 29 BC, and then empress dowager from 29 BC according to traditional dates.

== Life ==
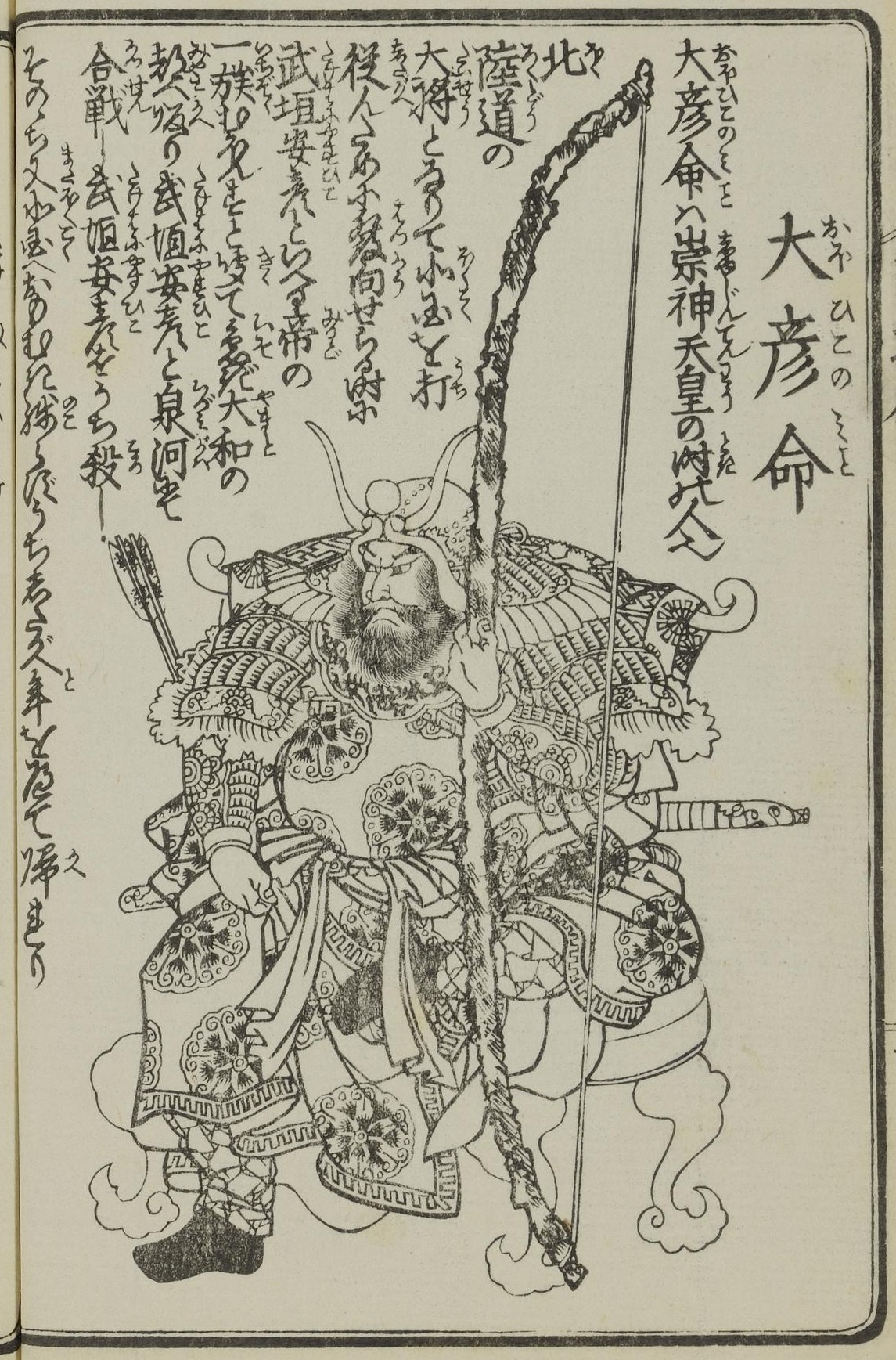
Mimaki-hime's father, Prince Ōhiko

The Nihon Shoki mentions her children as Emperor Suinin, Izanomawaka, Kunikatahime, Chijitsukuyamatohime, and Yamatohiko, whereas in the Kojiki she has another child named Igahime. The Nihon Shoki also states that she had her children with Emperor Sujin before her ascension as empress consort. While the Nihon Shoki does not give a name for her father, the Kojiki gives her father's name as Prince Ōhiko.

== Notes ==
Japanese royalty
Preceded by Ikagashikome	Empress consort of Japan; 97–29 BC	Succeeded by Saho-hime
Preceded by Ikagashikome	Empress dowager of Japan appointed in 29 BC	Succeeded by Yasakairi-hime
