= Emperor Suinin =

Legendary emperor of Japan

Emperor Suinin 垂仁天皇
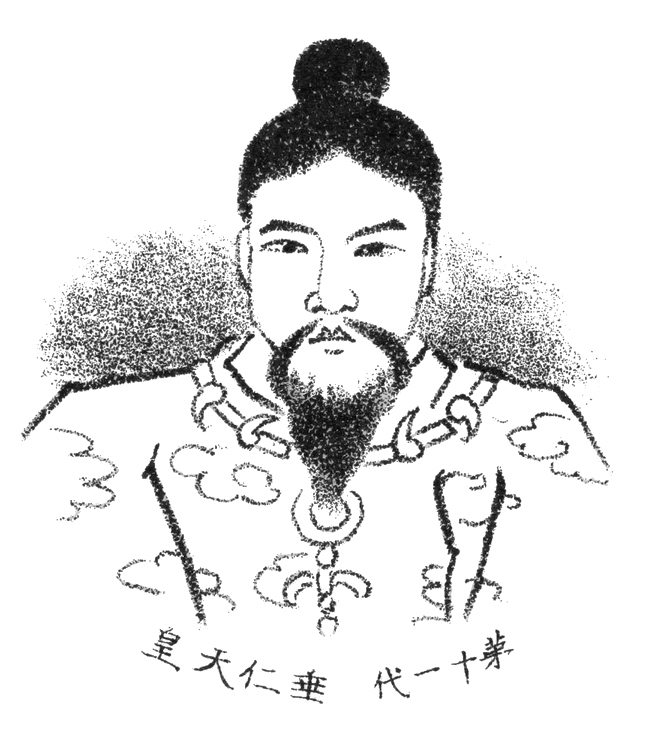

Emperor of Japan
- Reign: 29 BC – 70 (traditional)
- Predecessor: Sujin
- Successor: Keikō
- Born: Ikume (活目尊); 69 BC
- Died: 70 (aged 139)
- Burial: Sugawara no Fushimi no higashi no misasagi (菅原伏見東陵) (Nara)
- Spouses: Saho-hime; Hibasu-hime
- Issue among others...: Emperor Keikō
Posthumous name
- Chinese-style shigō: Emperor Suinin (垂仁天皇) Japanese-style shigō: Ikumeiribikoisachi no Sumeramikoto (活目入彦五十狭茅天皇)
- House: Imperial House of Japan
- Father: Emperor Sujin
- Mother: Mimaki-hime
- Religion: Shinto

Emperor Suinin (垂仁天皇, Suinin-tennō), also known as Ikumeiribikoisachi no Sumeramikoto (活目入彦五十狭茅天皇) was the 11th legendary Emperor of Japan, according to the traditional order of succession. Less is known about Suinin than his father, and likewise he is also considered to be a "legendary emperor". Both the Kojiki, and the Nihon Shoki (collectively known as the Kiki) record events that took place during Suinin's alleged lifetime. This legendary narrative tells how he ordered his daughter Yamatohime-no-mikoto to establish a new permanent shrine for Amaterasu (the Sun Goddess), which eventually became known as the Ise Grand Shrine. Other events that were recorded concurrently with his reign include the origins of Sumo wrestling in the form of a wrestling match involving Nomi no Sukune.

Suinin's reign is conventionally considered to have been from 29 BC to AD 70. During his alleged lifetime, he fathered seventeen children with two chief wives (empress) and six consorts. One of his sons became the next emperor upon his death in 70 AD, but the location of his father's grave (if any) is unknown. Suinin is traditionally venerated at a memorial Shinto tomb (misasagi) at Nishi-machi, Amagatsuji, Nara City.

== Legendary narrative ==
The Japanese have traditionally accepted this sovereign's historical existence, and a mausoleum (misasagi) for Suinin is currently maintained. There remains no conclusive evidence though that supports this historical figure actually reigning. The following information available is taken from the pseudo-historical Kojiki and Nihon Shoki, which are collectively known as Kiki (記紀) or Japanese chronicles. These chronicles include legends and myths, as well as potential historical facts that have since been exaggerated and/or distorted over time. The records state that Suinin was born sometime in 69 BC, and was the third son of Emperor Sujin. Suinin's empress mother was named Mimaki-hime, who is also former Emperor Kōgen's daughter. Before he was enthroned sometime in 29 BC, his pre-ascension name was Prince Ikumeiribikoisachi no Sumeramikoto. He appears to have ascended the throne a year before his father's death in 30 BC, and ruled from the palace of Tamaki-no-miya (師木玉垣宮; and in the Nihon Shoki as 纒向珠城宮) at Makimuku in what later became Yamato Province.

Suinin is best known for events that surround the founding of the Ise Grand Shrine. The Nihon Shoki states that around 2,000 years ago the Emperor ordered his daughter Yamatohime-no-mikoto, to find a permanent location to worship the goddess Amaterasu-ōmikami (the Sun Goddess). Yamatohime searched for 20 years before settling on a location in Ise, where she established Naiku, (Note: The Ise Grand Shrine is a complex composed of a large number of Shinto shrines centered on two main shrines, Naikū (内宮) and Gekū (外宮).) the Inner Shrine. She is said to have chosen the location after she heard the voice of Amaterasu say; "(Ise) is a secluded and pleasant land. In this land I wish to dwell." Amaterasu had previously been enshrined and worshipped in Kasanui, which was set up by Suinin's father in an attempt to alleviate a devastating plaque. The Kojiki records that during the reign of Emperor Suinin, the first Saiō (High Priestess) was appointed for Ise Grand Shrine. This recording is also noted by Jien, who was a 13th-century historian and poet. This remains disputed though, as the Man'yōshū (The Anthology of Ten Thousand Leaves) states that the first Saiō to serve at Ise was Princess Ōku. If the latter is true then it would date the Saiō appointments to the reign of Emperor Tenmu (c. 673 – 686 AD).

There were other events during Suinin's reign as well that include an Asama Shrine tradition regarding Mount Fuji. The earliest veneration of Konohanasakuya-hime at the base of the mountain was said to be during the 3rd year of Emperor Suinin's reign. The Nihon Shoki also records a wrestling match in which Nomi no Sukune and Taima no Kehaya held during his era, as the origin of Sumai (Sumo wrestling). Meanwhile, Emperor Suinin's family grew to consist of 17 children with eight variously ranked wives. One of his consorts named Kaguya-hime-no-Mikoto, is mentioned in the Kojiki as a possible basis for the legend of Kaguya-hime regarding the couple's love story. Emperor Suinin died in 70 AD at the age of 138, and his son Prince Ootarashihikoosirowake was enthroned as the next emperor the following year.

== Known information ==
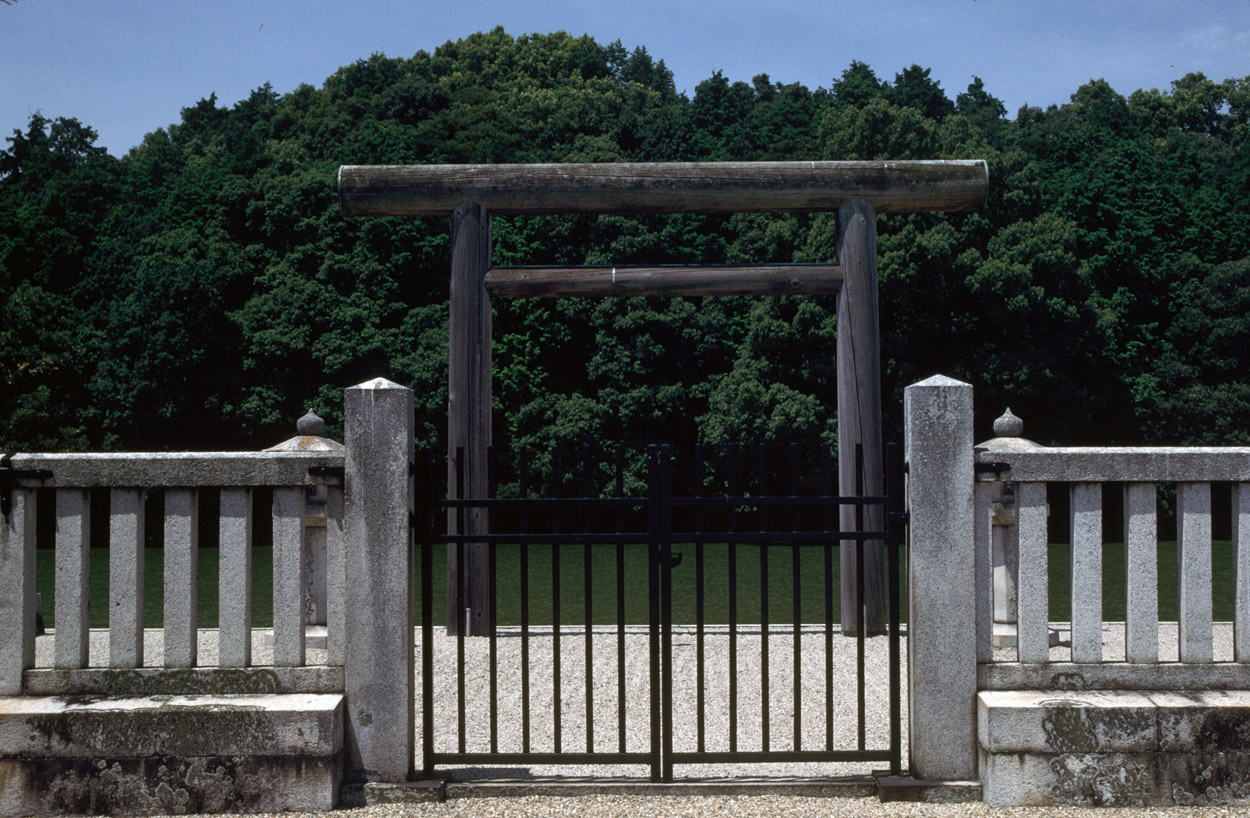
Official mausoleum (misasagi) of Emperor Suinin, Nara Prefecture

Emperor Suinin is regarded by historians as a "legendary Emperor" as there is insufficient material available for further verification and study. Unlike Emperor Sujin, there is less known about Suinin to possibly support his existence. In either case (fictional or not), the name Suinin-tennō was assigned to him posthumously by later generations. His name might have been regularized centuries after the lifetime ascribed to Suinin, possibly during the time in which legends about the origins of the imperial dynasty were compiled as the chronicles known today as the Kojiki. Suinin's longevity was also written down by later compilers, who may have unrealistically extended his age to fill in time gaps. While the actual site of Suinin's grave is not known, the Emperor is traditionally venerated at a memorial Shinto shrine (misasagi) at Nishi-machi, Amagatsuji, Nara City. The Imperial Household Agency designates this location as Suinin's mausoleum, and is formally named Sugawara no Fushimi no higashi no misasagi.

While the Ise Grand Shrine is traditionally said to have been established in the 1st century BC, other dates in the 3rd and 4th centuries have also been put forward for the establishment of Naikū and Gekū respectively. The first shrine building at Naikū was allegedly erected by Emperor Tenmu (678–686), with the first ceremonial rebuilding being carried out by his wife, Empress Jitō, in 692. Outside of the Kiki, the reign of Emperor Kinmei (Note: The 29th Emperor) (c. 509 – 571 AD) is the first for which contemporary historiography has been able to assign verifiable dates. The conventionally accepted names and dates of the early Emperors were not confirmed as "traditional" though, until the reign of Emperor Kanmu (Note: Kanmu was the 50th sovereign of the imperial dynasty) between 737 and 806 AD.

== Consorts and children ==
Emperor Suinin had two chief wives (aka Empress), it is recorded in the Kiki that the first empress was named Saho. Not much is known about her other than that her father was Emperor Kaika's son and she allegedly died sometime in 34 AD. As with the first empress there is also not much known about Suinin's second chief wife Hibasu. She was the daughter Prince Tanba-no-Michinoushi, who was Prince Hikoimasu's son and Emperor Kaika's grandson. Hibasu's third son later became known as Emperor Keikō (the next emperor), she allegedly died sometime in 61 AD. Suinin also had six named consorts with an additional one remaining unknown. Prince Tanba-no-Michinoushi (previously mentioned), was also the father to three of Suinin's consorts. In all the Emperor's family consisted of 17 children with these variously ranked wives.

=== Spouse ===
| Position | Name | Father | Issue |
|---|---|---|---|
| Empress (1st) | Saho-hime (狭穂姫命) | Prince Hikoimasu | • First Son: Prince Homutsuwake (誉津別命) |
| Empress (2nd) | Hibasu-hime (日葉酢媛命) | Prince Tanba-no-Michinoushi | • Prince Inishikiirihiko (五十瓊敷入彦命) • Third Son: Prince Ootarashihikoosirowake (大足彦忍代別尊) • Princess Oonakatsu-hime (大中姫命) • Princess Yamato-hime (倭姫命) (Note: Yamato is said to have established Ise Grand Shrine where the Sun Goddess, Amaterasu Omikami is enshrined. It remains unverified and up for debate if she was the first Saiō (high priestess) as alternate theories exist .) • Prince Wakakiniirihiko (稚城瓊入彦命) |

=== Concubines ===
| Name | Father | Issue |
|---|---|---|
| Nubataniiri-hime (渟葉田瓊入媛) | Prince Tanba-no-Michinoushi | • Prince Nuteshiwake (鐸石別命) • Princess Ikatarashi-hime (胆香足姫命) |
| Matono-hime (真砥野媛) | Prince Tanba-no-Michinoushi | —N/a |
| Azaminiiri-hime (薊瓊入媛) | Prince Tanba-no-Michinoushi | • Prince Ikohayawake (息速別命) • Princess Wakaasatsu-hime (稚浅津姫命) |
| Kaguya-hime (迦具夜比売) | Prince Ootsutsukitarine | • Prince Onabe (袁那弁王) |
| Kanihatatobe (綺戸辺) | Yamashiro no Ookuni no Fuchi | • Prince Iwatsukuwake (磐撞別命) • Princess Futaji Irihime (両道入姫命) |
| Karihatatobe (苅幡戸辺) | Yamashiro no Ookuni no Fuchi | • Prince Oochiwake (祖別命) • Prince Ikatarashihiko (五十日足彦命) • Prince Itakeruwake (胆武別命) |
| Unknown | —N/a | • Prince Tuburame (円目王) |

=== Issue ===
| Status | Name | Mother | Comments |
|---|---|---|---|
| Prince | Homutsuwake (誉津別命) | Saho-hime | —N/a |
| Prince | Inishikiirihiko (五十瓊敷入彦命) | Hibasu-hime | —N/a |
| Prince | Ootarashihikoosirowake (大足彦忍代別尊) | Hibasu-hime | Later known as Emperor Keikō |
| Princess | Oonakatsu-hime (大中姫命) | Hibasu-hime | —N/a |
| Princess | Yamato-hime (倭姫命) | Hibasu-hime | Possibly the first Saiō. |
| Prince | Wakakiniirihiko (稚城瓊入彦命) | Hibasu-hime | —N/a |
| Prince | Nuteshiwake (鐸石別命) | Nubataniiri-hime | Ancestor of the Wake clan (Wake no Kiyomaro). |
| Princess | Ikatarashi-hime (胆香足姫命) | Nubataniiri-hime | —N/a |
| Prince | Ikohayawake (息速別命) | Azaminiiri-hime | —N/a |
| Princess | Wakaasatsu-hime (稚浅津姫命) | Azaminiiri-hime | —N/a |
| Prince | Onabe (袁那弁王) | Kaguya-hime | —N/a |
| Prince | Iwatsukuwake (磐撞別命) | Kanihatatobe | Ancestor of the Mio clan (三尾氏), and maternal ancestor of Emperor Keitai. |
| Princess | Futajiiri-hime (両道入姫命) | Kanihatatobe | Later married Prince Ōsu, was the mother of Emperor Chūai. |
| Prince | Oochiwake (祖別命) | Karihatatobe | —N/a |
| Prince | Ikatarashihiko (五十日足彦命) | Karihatatobe | —N/a |
| Prince | Itakeruwake (胆武別命) | Karihatatobe | —N/a |
| Prince | Tuburame (円目王) | Unknown | —N/a |

== See also ==
- Emperor of Japan
- List of Emperors of Japan
- Imperial cult

== Notes ==
Regnal titles
| Preceded by Emperor Sujin | Legendary Emperor of Japan; 29 BC – 70 (traditional dates) | Succeeded by Emperor Keikō |
