= Toyo (queen) =

Toyo/Iyo

Queen of Yamataikoku
- Reign: c. 248 CE – Unknown
- Predecessor: Unknown king (successor of Queen Himiko)
- Successor: Unknown
- Born: 235 CE; Yamatai, Japan
- Died: Unknown

Toyo (臺與/台与), also known as Iyo (壹與/壱与), (235–?) was a queen regnant of Yamatai-koku in Japan. She was, according to the "Records of Wei" and other traditional sources, the successor of Queen Himiko. Some historians believe she is the mother of Emperor Sujin.

== Reign ==
Iyo is not cited in many historical records, and her origin is unknown. Records claim that Iyo was a close relative of Himiko, and she acquired great political power at a very young age. Information obtained from Chinese sources and from archeological and ethnological discoveries has led Japanese scholars to conclude that Iyo was Himiko's niece. Himiko and Iyo were female shamans and that sovereignty had both a political and a religious character.

After Himiko's death, a man took power in Yamatai as ruler. However, warfare soon engulfed the polity. The ruling council met and decided to put another woman on the throne. The one chosen was Iyo, a girl only 13 years old, who succeeded in reinstating peace in her government by following the same political line adopted by Queen Himiko.

The Records of Wei describes Himiko's death and Iyo's rise in the following terms:

When Himiko passed away, a great mound was raised, more than a hundred paces in diameter. Over a hundred male and female attendants followed her to the grave. Then a king was placed on the throne, but the people would not obey him. Assassination and murder followed; more than one thousand were thus slain. A relative of Himiko named Iyo [壹與], a girl of thirteen, was [then] made queen and order was restored. (Zhang) Zheng (張政) (an ambassador from Wei), issued a proclamation to the effect that Iyo was the ruler. (tr. Tsunoda 1951:16)

Iyo continued, or restored, tributary relations between Wa and Wei; Wei officials were included among her advisors, and she sent an embassy of twenty individuals, led by her grand steward Isako, to accompany some of these Chinese officials back to China. Her embassy presented 30 Japanese female and male slaves to China as tribute, along with five thousand white pearls, two large green hooked beads, and twenty pieces of varied brocade with unique patterns.

== In popular culture ==
- Appears as the titular character in the novel series Matsura Iyohime (まつら伊世姫) by Junji Hasegawa (1991)
- Appears in the novel Kishin (kishin -姫神-) by Shinji Sadakane (2001)
- Appears in manga series Raika (雷火), story by Yū Terashima, art by Kamui Fujiwara (1987-1997)
- Appears as a main character in the manga series Yamato Gensōki (邪馬台幻想記) by Kentaro Yabuki (1999)
- Appears in the manga series Ao no Jidai (青青の時代) by Ryoko Yamagishi (1998-2000)
- Appears in the mobile game Fate/Grand Order as a Ruler-class Servant voiced by Ari Ozawa, developed by Lasengle and published by Aniplex (2022)
- Appears in the mobile game Magia Record as a playable character voiced by Misaki Yamada, developed by f4samurai and published by Aniplex (2023)
