= Saho-hime =

Legendary empress consort of Japan, goddess of spring

Saho-hime 狭穂姫命
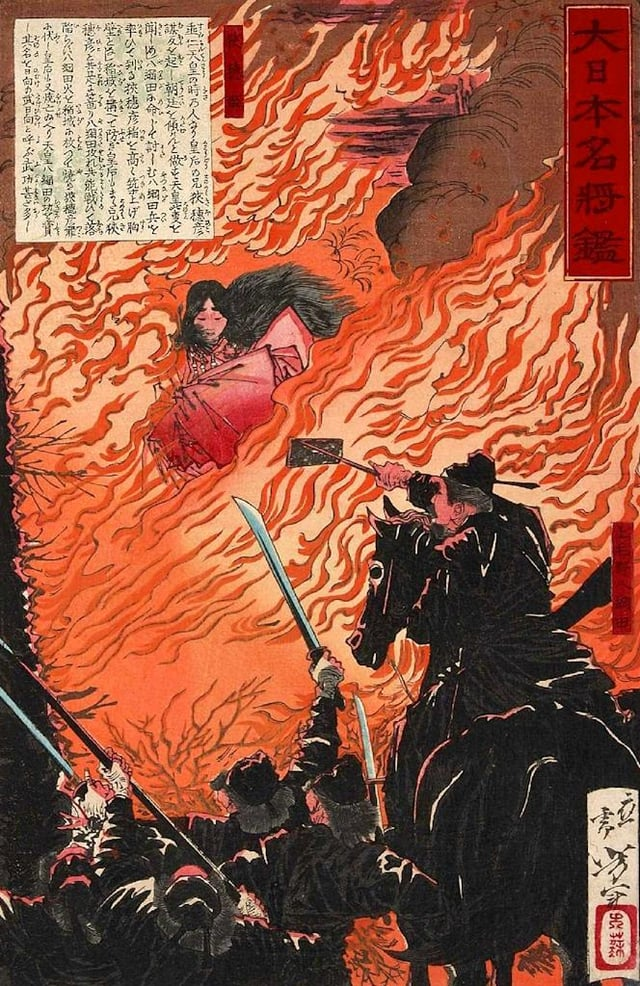
- Saho-hime burning in her brother's palace (by Tsukioka Yoshitoshi)

Empress consort of Japan
- Tenure: 28–25 BC
- Born: Unknown
- Died: 25 BC
- Spouse: Emperor Suinin
- Issue: Homutsuwake no Mikoto
- Father: Hikoimasu
- Mother: Sahono Okuramitome
- Religion: Shinto

Saho-hime (Note: Saho-hime's name is also spelt as Sahobime, or Sahajihime.) (狭穂姫命) was the legendary empress consort of Japan from 28 BC to 25 BC.

== Life ==
In both the Nihon Shoki and the Kojiki, she was a granddaughter of Emperor Kaika and gave birth to one son who, according to the Nihon Shoki could not speak. Saho-hime died during a rebellion caused by her older brother, Sahohiko. Sahohiko tried to persuade her to kill her husband Emperor Suinin. He asked her whom she loved more, him or the Emperor. When she said the Emperor he reminded her that he had other mistresses. This plan worked and she agreed to kill Emperor Suinin. Saho-hime almost killed the Emperor but she cried and her tears woke the Emperor up. She revealed the plot by her brother to him out of guilt. Infuriated that his brother-in-law tried to make his wife kill him, the Emperor sent his troops to his brother-in-law's palace to take his life.

== The Nihon Shoki's account of her demise ==
After her husband sent troops to her brother's castle, in the Nihon Shoki, Saho-hime went to her brother's palace with their son out of guilt for attempting to kill the Emperor, and refused to leave until it burned down. As it was burning, her brother escaped, along with Saho-hime's son but the Empress died.

== The Kojiki's account of her demise ==
In the Kojiki, after Emperor Suinin woke up and Saho-hime went to her brother's castle she gave birth. The Emperor ordered his guards to turn away until she gave birth, and then retrieve her. While the palace was still burning she gave birth. As the Emperor's men came to retrieve Saho-hime's newborn, the child was placed outside the fortress and Saho-hime shaved her head. As the men took Saho-hime, her clothes fell off, as did her hair allowing her to escape due to the soldiers being stunned in shock. The Emperor was angered and as she was escaping asked her to choose a name for the child. She chose the name Homutsuwake (fire-possessing lord) as the palace was burning whilst she was giving birth. Whilst she and her brother were escaping Suinin killed her brother and Saho-hime herself.

== Legacy ==
It is believed Saho-hime is the deity that lives on Mount Saho and is the goddess of spring.

There is a poem attributed to Emperor Go-Toba about her:

"The hazy clothes of Princess Saho are faded, and the flower brocades are quickly faded"

== See also ==
- List of Japanese deities

== Notes ==
Japanese royalty
Preceded by Mimaki-hime	Empress consort of Japan; 28–25 BC	Succeeded by Hibasu-hime
