= Hibasu-hime =

Hibasu-hime 日葉酢媛命

Empress consort of Japan
- Tenure: 15 BC – 3 AD
- Died: 3 AD
- Spouse: Emperor Suinin
- Issue: Prince Inishikiirihiko; Emperor Keikō; Princess Oonakatsu-hime; Princess Yamatohime-no-mikoto; Prince Wakakiniirihiko
- Father: Tanba no Michinushi
- Mother: Tanba no Kawakami no Masurōjo

Hibasu-hime (日葉酢媛命) was the second and final wife of Emperor Suinin. She was empress consort from 15 BC until her death in 3 AD. Her husband outlived her, dying in 70 AD.

== Life ==
Hibasu-hime was born as one of five daughters. Her father was summoned to the palace a few years after the death of the Emperor's first wife, Saho-hime. In August of the same year, she became empress consort. Upon her death, the Emperor outlawed the practice of servants being buried alive during the funeral of the Empress. Instead, he started the practice of using Haniwa, to represent humans.

== Notes ==
Japanese royalty
Preceded by Saho-hime	Empress consort of Japan; 15 BC – 3 AD	Succeeded by Harima no Inabi no Ōiratsume
