= Oto-takara =

Mythical Japanese figure, wife of Emperor Seimu

Oto-takara 弟財郎女
- Spouse: Emperor Seimu
- Children: Prince Wakanuke
- Father: Takeoshiyama-Tarine

Oto-takara (弟財郎女) was the wife of Emperor Seimu, and the mother of Prince Wakanuke, who is presumed to have died young. Because she was not of imperial descent, Oto-takara was not given the title Kōgō, thus not counting her as an Empress Consort.

== Life ==
She was born the daughter of a man named Takeoshiyama-Tarine. Oto-takara was not promoted to the title of Kōgō however, as her father was not a prince. She married Emperor Seimu, and bore him one son, a prince named Wakanuke, who died young. Yamato Takeru's son was named crown prince soon after, as Oto-takara did not produce anymore children. Ultimately, in 192 this came to pass and Emperor Chūai was enthroned. Due to her not producing any more children, her husband became the last direct descendent from Emperor Jimmu, and was the first split branch; others later followed.
