= Emperor Keikō =

Legendary emperor of Japan

Emperor Keikō 景行天皇
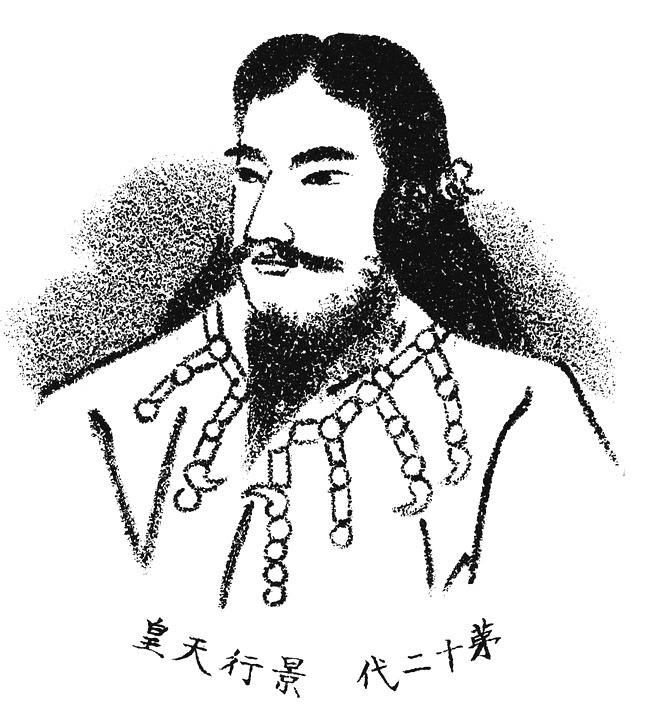

Emperor of Japan
- Reign: 71–130 AD (traditional)
- Predecessor: Suinin
- Successor: Seimu
- Born: Ōtarashihiko (大足彦尊); 13 BC
- Died: 130 (aged 143)
- Burial: Yamanobe no michi no e no misasagi (山辺道上陵) (Nara)
- Spouses: Harima no Inabi no Ōiratsume; Yasakairi-hime
- Issue among others...: Prince Ōsu; Emperor Seimu
Posthumous name
- Chinese-style shigō: Emperor Keikō (景行天皇) Japanese-style shigō: Ōtarashihiko-oshirowake no Sumeramikoto (大足彦忍代別天皇)
- House: Imperial House of Japan
- Father: Emperor Suinin
- Mother: Hibasu-hime
- Religion: Shinto

Emperor Keikō (景行天皇, Keikō-tennō), also known as Ootarashihikooshirowake no Sumeramikoto (大足彦忍代別天皇) and Ōtarashihiko-oshirowake no Mikoto (大帯日子淤斯呂和氣天皇), was the 12th (and legendary) emperor of Japan, according to the traditional order of succession. Both the Kojiki and the Nihon Shoki (collectively known as the Kiki) record events that took place during Keikō's alleged lifetime.

Keikō was recorded as being an exceptionally tall emperor who had a very large family. During his reign he sought to expand territorial control through conquest of local tribes. He had a very important son named "Prince Ōsu", now known as the folk hero Yamato Takeru, who was in possession of the Kusanagi no Tsurugi when he died. This treasure was later moved to Atsuta Shrine in Nagoya, Aichi Prefecture, and is now a part of the Imperial Regalia of Japan. It is possible that Keikō lived or reigned in the 4th century rather than the first, but more information is needed.

Keikō's reign is conventionally considered to have been from 71 to 130. During his alleged lifetime, he fathered at least 80 children with two chief wives (empress) and nine consorts. One of his sons became the next emperor upon his death in 130, but the location of Keikō's grave (if any) is unknown. Keikō is traditionally venerated at a misasagi (陵) at Nara.

== Legendary narrative ==
The Japanese have traditionally accepted this sovereign's historical existence, and a mausoleum (misasagi) for Keiko is currently maintained. The following information is drawn from the pseudo-historical Kojiki and Nihon Shoki, collectively known as Kiki (記紀) or Japanese chronicles. These chronicles include legends and myths, as well as purported historical facts that have since been exaggerated and/or distorted. The records state that Keikō was born sometime in 13 BCE, and was given the name Otarashihiko-no-mikoto. He was the third son of Emperor Suinin, and his second empress wife "Hibasu-hime". Otarashihiko-no-mikoto was allegedly chosen as crown prince over his elder brother based on a casual question on what they both had wished for. In the former's case, he said, "The Empire," while his elder brother said "Bow and arrows". Otarashi-hiko later ascended to the throne in 71 CE a year after his father's death.

Accounts in the Kojiki and Nihon Shoki are split when it comes to initial territorial expansion during Emperor Keikō's reign. In the Kojiki, the Emperor is said to have sent his son Prince Ōsu to Kyūshū to conquer local tribes. Alternatively, the Nihon Shoki records that he went there himself and won battles against local tribes. Both sources agree that Keikō later sent Yamato Takeru to Izumo Province (now eastern Shimane Prefecture) then and the eastern provinces to conquer the area and spread his territory. According to traditional sources, Yamato Takeru died in the 43rd year of Emperor Keiko's reign (景行天皇四十三年). His possessions were gathered together along with the Kusanagi sword, and his widow venerated his memory in a shrine at her home. Sometime later, these relics and the sacred sword were moved to the current location of the Atsuta Shrine.

Emperor Keikō was recorded as a giant of 10 feet 2 inches (310 cm), who had at least 80 children from multiple wives. Other than Yamato Takeru, at least three of Keikō's children were ancestors of notable clans. According to tradition, Keikō died in 130 at the age of 143, and his son Prince 'Wakatarashi-hiko was enthroned as Emperor Seimu the following year.

== Known information ==
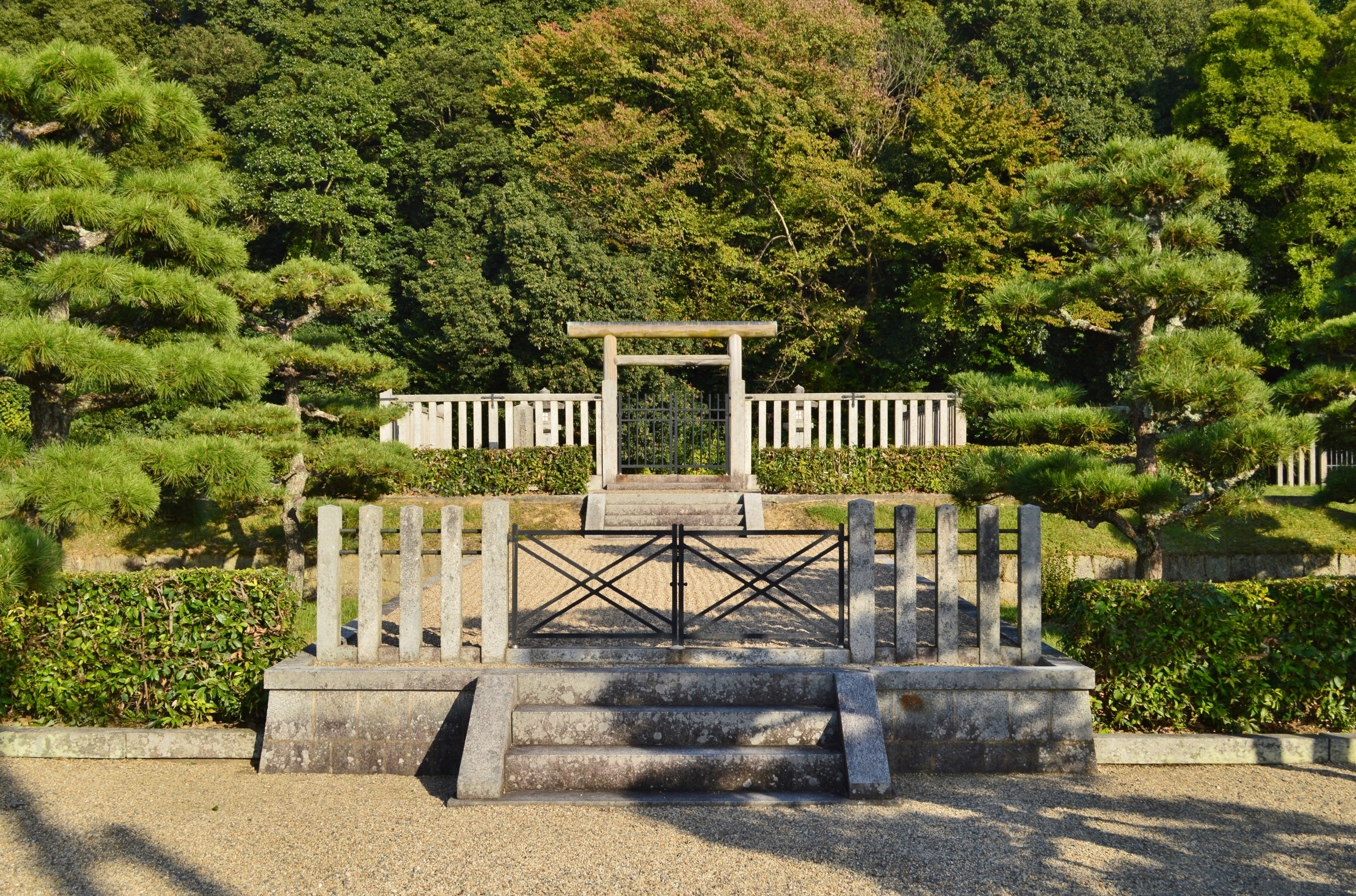
Keikō's misasagi, Tenri, Nara

Emperor Keikō is regarded by historians as a "legendary Emperor" as there is insufficient material available for further verification and study. The Sino-Japanese name Keikō and the title tennō 'emperor' were given posthumously by later generations. His name might have been regularized centuries after the lifetime ascribed to him, possibly during the time in which legends about the origins of the imperial dynasty were compiled as the chronicles known today as the Kojiki.

There is a possibility that Keikō's era was in the 4th century rather than the 1st. This period is concurrent with the Japanese missions to Tang China having an audience with the Tang emperor, though more evidence is needed to make any conclusions. Like his father before him, Keikō is also known to have an exaggerated lifespan, which is unlikely to be factual. The consecutive reigns of the emperors were compiled in the 8th century, and it is thought that age gaps were "filled up" to address numerous lacunae. For comparison, verified ages in the 110s have since been documented and recorded as the "oldest in the world".

Although the exact site of Keikō's grave is unknown, the Emperor is traditionally venerated at a misasagi in Tenri, Nara. The Imperial Household Agency designates this location as Keikō's mausoleum, and it is formally named Yamanobe no michi no e no misasagi. Outside of the Kiki, the reign of Emperor Kinmei (Note: The 29th Emperor) (c. 509 – 571) is the first for which contemporary historiography has been able to assign verifiable dates. The conventionally accepted names and dates of the early emperors were not confirmed as "traditional" though, until the reign of Emperor Kanmu (Note: Kanmu was the 50th sovereign of the imperial dynasty) between 737 and 806.

== Consorts and children ==
Emperor Keikō allegedly had a very large family which consisted of 2 wives, 9 concubines, and more than 80 children (51 of which are listed here). It is now questionable and open to debate, though, whether these numbers are genuine or not. Some of his listed children might actually be duplicates of the same person. The size of Keikō's family also could have been exaggerated over time through legends and word of mouth stories.

=== Spouse ===
Position	Name	Father	Issue
Empress (1st)	Harima no Inabi no Ōiratsume (播磨稲日大郎姫)	Prince Wakatakehiko (Note: Wakatakehiko was one of Emperor Kōrei's sons.)	• Prince Kushitsunowake (櫛角別王) • Prince Ōsu (大碓皇子) • Prince Ōsu (小碓尊)
Empress (2nd)	Yasakairi-hime (八坂入媛命)	Prince Yasakairihiko (Note: Yasakairihiko was one of Emperor Sujin's sons.)	• Prince Wakatarashihiko (稚足彦尊) • Prince Iokiirihiko (五百城入彦皇子) • Prince Oshinowake (忍之別皇子) • Prince Wakayamatoneko (稚倭根子皇子) • Prince Ōsuwake (大酢別皇子) • Princess Nunoshino-hime-miko (渟熨斗皇女) • Princess Iokiirihime-miko (五百城入姫皇女) • Princess Kagoyori-hime-miko (麛依姫皇女) • Prince Isakiirihiko (五十狭城入彦皇子) • Prince Kibinoehiko (吉備兄彦皇子) • Princess Takagiiri-hime-miko (高城入姫皇女) • Princess Oto-hime-miko (弟姫皇女)

=== Concubines ===
Name	Father	Issue
Mizuhanoiratsume (水歯郎媛)	Prince Iwatsukuwake (Note: Iwatsukuwake was one of Emperor Suinin's sons.)	• Princess Ionono-hime-miko (五百野皇女)
Ikawa-hime (五十河媛)	Unknown	• Prince Kamukushi (神櫛皇子) • Prince Inaseirihiko (稲背入彦皇子)
Abenotakada-hime (阿倍高田媛)	Abe no Kogoto	• Prince Takekunikoriwake (武国凝別皇子)
Himuka no Kaminagaootane (日向髪長大田根)	Unknown	• Prince Himuka no Sotsuhiko (日向襲津彦皇子)
Sonotake-hime (襲武媛)	Unknown	• Prince Kunichiwake (国乳別皇子) • Prince Kunisewake (国背別皇子) • Prince Toyotowake (豊戸別皇子)
Himukanomihakashi-hime (日向御刀媛)	Unknown	• Prince Toyokuniwake (豊国別皇子)
Inabinowakairatsume (伊那毘若郎女)	Prince Wakatakehiko	• Prince Mawaka (真若王) • Prince Hikohitoōe (彦人大兄命)
Igoto-hime (五十琴姫命)	Mononobe no Igui	• Prince Igotohiko (五十功彦命)
Unknown	Unknown	• See below

=== Issue ===
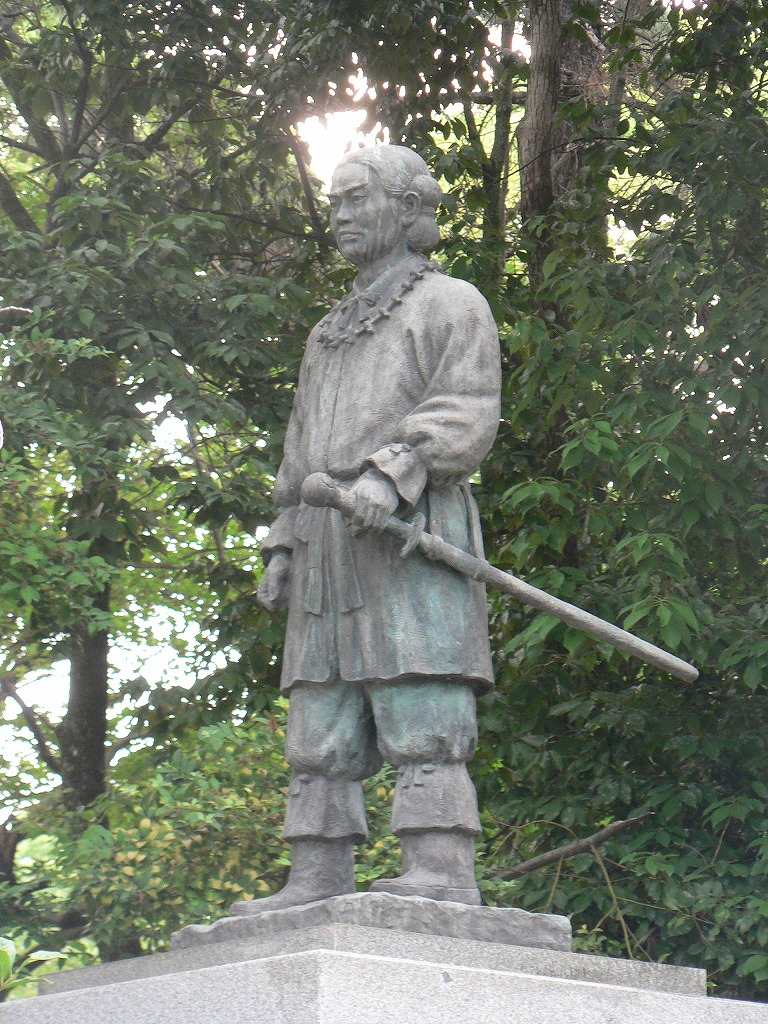
Yamato Takeru later became a legend in his own right.

Status	Name	Mother	Comments
Prince	Kushitsunowake (櫛角別王)	Harima no Inabi no Ōiratsume	
Prince	Ōusu (大碓皇子)	Harima no Inabi no Ōiratsume	Ancestor of Mugetsu no kimi (身毛津君)
Prince	Yamato Takeru (aka Ōsu) (小碓尊)	Harima no Inabi no Ōiratsume	Ōsu, later known as Yamato Takeru, was the father of Emperor Chūai.
Prince	Wakatarashihiko (稚足彦尊)	Yasakairi-hime	Wakatarashihiko became the next emperor. (Known as "Seimu" posthumously)
Prince	Iokiirihiko (五百城入彦皇子)	Yasakairi-hime	
Prince	Oshinowake (忍之別皇子)	Yasakairi-hime	
Prince	Wakayamatoneko (稚倭根子皇子)	Yasakairi-hime	
Prince	Ōsuwake (大酢別皇子)	Yasakairi-hime	
Princess	Nunoshino-hime-miko (渟熨斗皇女)	Yasakairi-hime	
Princess	Iokiirihime-miko (五百城入姫皇女)	Yasakairi-hime	
Princess	Kagoyori-hime-miko (麛依姫皇女)	Yasakairi-hime	
Prince	Isakiirihiko (五十狭城入彦皇子)	Yasakairi-hime	Isakiirihiko is the ancestor of Mitsukai no Muraji (御使連)
Prince	Kibinoehiko (吉備兄彦皇子)	Yasakairi-hime	
Princess	Takagiiri-hime-miko (高城入姫皇女)	Yasakairi-hime	
Princess	Oto-hime-miko (弟姫皇女)	Yasakairi-hime	
Princess	Ionono-hime-miko (五百野皇女)	Mizuhanoiratsume	Ionono-hime-miko was possibly also a Saiō.
Prince	Kamukushi (神櫛皇子)	Ikawa-hime	
Prince	Inaseirihiko (稲背入彦皇子)	Ikawa-hime	
Prince	Takekunikoriwake (武国凝別皇子)	Abenotakada-hime	
Prince	Himuka no Sotsuhiko (日向襲津彦皇子)	Himuka no Kaminagaootane	
Prince	Kunichiwake (国乳別皇子)	Sonotake-hime	
Prince	Kunisewake (国背別皇子)	Sonotake-hime	
Prince	Toyotowake (豊戸別皇子)	Sonotake-hime	
Prince	Toyokuniwake (豊国別皇子)	Himukanomihakashi-hime	Ancestor of Himuka no Kuni no miyatsuko (日向国造)
Prince	Mawaka (真若王)	Inabinowakairatsume	
Prince	Hikohitoōe (彦人大兄命)	Inabinowakairatsume	
Prince	Igotohiko (五十功彦命)	Igoto-hime	
Princess	Shirogane (銀王)	Unknown	Married Prince Hikohitoōe
Prince	Wakaki-no-Irihiko (若木之入日子王)	Unknown	Speculated as the same person with Prince Iokiirihiko
Prince	Wakayahiko (稚屋彦命)	Unknown	
Prince	Amatarashine (天帯根命)	Unknown	
Prince	Takekunikowake (武国皇別命)	Unknown	Speculated as the same person with Prince Takekunikoriwake
Prince	Ososhikowake (大曽色別命)	Unknown	
Prince	Iwakosowake (石社別命)	Unknown	
Prince	Takeoshiwake (武押別命)	Unknown	Speculated as the same person with Prince Oshinowake
Prince	Sonomewake (曽能目別命)	Unknown	
Prince	Tochiribiko (十市入彦命)	Unknown	
Prince	Sonowashiwake (襲小橋別命)	Unknown	
Prince	Shirokoriwake (色己焦別命)	Unknown	
Prince	Okinaga-no-hikohitoōe-Mizuki (息長彦人大兄水城命)	Unknown	Speculated as the same person with Prince Hikohitoōe
Prince	Kuma-no-Oshitsuhiko (熊忍津彦命)	Unknown	
Prince	Takeotowake (武弟別命)	Unknown	
Prince	Kusaki (草木命)	Unknown	
Prince	Tagotowake (手事別命)	Unknown	
Prince	Oaretowake (大我門別命)	Unknown	
Prince	Toyohiwake (豊日別命)	Unknown	
Prince	Mikawa-no-Sukune (三河宿禰命)	Unknown	
Prince	Toyotewaka (豊手別命)	Unknown	
Prince	Yamato-no-Sukune (倭宿禰命)	Unknown	
Prince	Toyotsuhiko (豊津彦命)	Unknown	
Prince	Okoriwake (大焦別命)	Unknown	

== See also ==
- List of Emperors of Japan
- Imperial cult
- Takahashi Ujibumi

== Notes ==
Japanese Imperial kamon — a stylized chrysanthemum blossom

Regnal titles
Preceded by Emperor Suinin	Legendary Emperor of Japan; 71–130 AD (traditional dates)	Succeeded by Emperor Seimu
