= Emperor Seimu =

Legendary emperor of Japan

Emperor Seimu 成務天皇
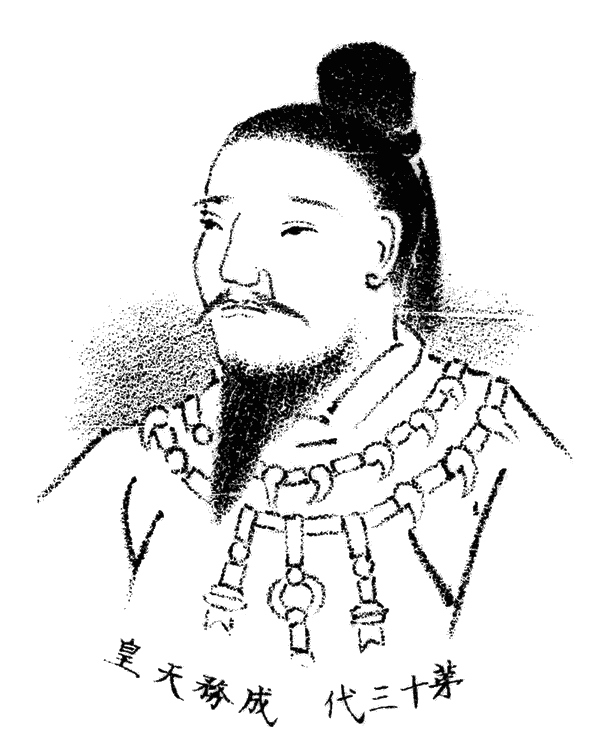

Emperor of Japan
- Reign: 131–190 (traditional)
- Predecessor: Keikō
- Successor: Chūai
- Born: Wakatarashi hiko (稚足彦尊); 84
- Died: 190 (aged 107) (Note: The Kojiki records that he was 95 when he died.)
- Burial: Saki no Tatanami no misasagi (狭城盾列池後陵) (Nara)
- Spouse: Oto-takara; Kibi-no-Iratsume
- Issue: Prince Wakanuke (Note: It is assumed by historians that Wakanuke died at a young age)
Posthumous name
- Chinese-style shigō: Emperor Seimu (成務天皇) Japanese-style shigō: Wakatarashi hiko no Sumera mikoto (稚足彦天皇)
- House: Imperial House of Japan
- Father: Emperor Keikō
- Mother: Yasakairi-hime
- Religion: Shinto

Emperor Seimu (成務天皇, Seimu-tennō), also known as Wakatarashi hiko no Sumera mikoto (稚足彦天皇), was the 13th legendary Emperor of Japan, according to the traditional order of succession. Both the Kojiki, and the Nihon Shoki (collectively known as the Kiki) record events that took place during Seimu's alleged lifetime. This legendary Emperor is best known for organizing his local governments by making the first appointments of their kind to provinces under his rule. Seimu had only one recorded wife who bore him a single child; he also had a concubine but she had no children. This is in stark contrast to his father, who is said to have had at least 80 children with multiple wives.

Seimu's reign is conventionally considered to have been from 131 to 190 AD. An issue ultimately occurred when his only son allegedly died at a young age. Seimu appointed one of his nephews to be crown prince before his death in 190 AD, marking the first of later generations which would cede the throne to a non-direct successor. While the location of Seimu's grave (if any) is unknown, he is traditionally venerated at a memorial Shinto tomb. Modern historians have come to the conclusion that the title of "Emperor" and the name "Seimu" was used by later generations to describe this legendary Emperor. It has also been proposed that Seimu actually reigned much later than he is attested.

== Legendary narrative ==
The Japanese have traditionally accepted this sovereign's historical existence, and a mausoleum (misasagi) for Seimu is currently maintained. The following information available is taken from the pseudo-historical Kojiki and Nihon Shoki, which are collectively known as Kiki (記紀) or Japanese chronicles. These chronicles include legends and myths, as well as potential historical facts that have since been exaggerated and/or distorted over time. The records state that Seimu was born to Yasakairi-hime sometime in 84 AD, and was given the name Wakatarashihiko (稚足彦尊). It is unknown how he was chosen as crown prince, but Wakatarashihiko later ascended to the throne in 131 AD. Seimu is best known for organizing his local governments by appointing the first provincial governors and district officials. While the details of his system of governing remain elusive, at the time Imperial princes were sent to important places in the provinces. These members are designated as wake, which represented their status as a branch of the Imperial family. It has been theorized by Brinkley and Kikuchi that these appointments of local governors were designed to extend the "prestige of the Court". Those that were eligible included "men of merit", Imperial princes, or chiefs of aboriginal tribes.

The records state that Seimu had a wife named Oho-takara (弟財郎女), who was the daughter of Take-oshiyama-tari-ne. Oho-takara bore the Emperor one child, named Prince Wakanuke (和訶奴気王). Seimu's only son appears to have died at a young age as the Emperor appointed Yamato Takeru's son as Crown Prince, before his own death in 190 AD at the age 107 years old. His nephew Tarashinakatsuhiko was later enthroned as the next emperor in 192 AD. Seimu's death marked an end of direct lineage from legendary Emperor Jimmu, and was the first split branch of others that later followed.

== Known information ==
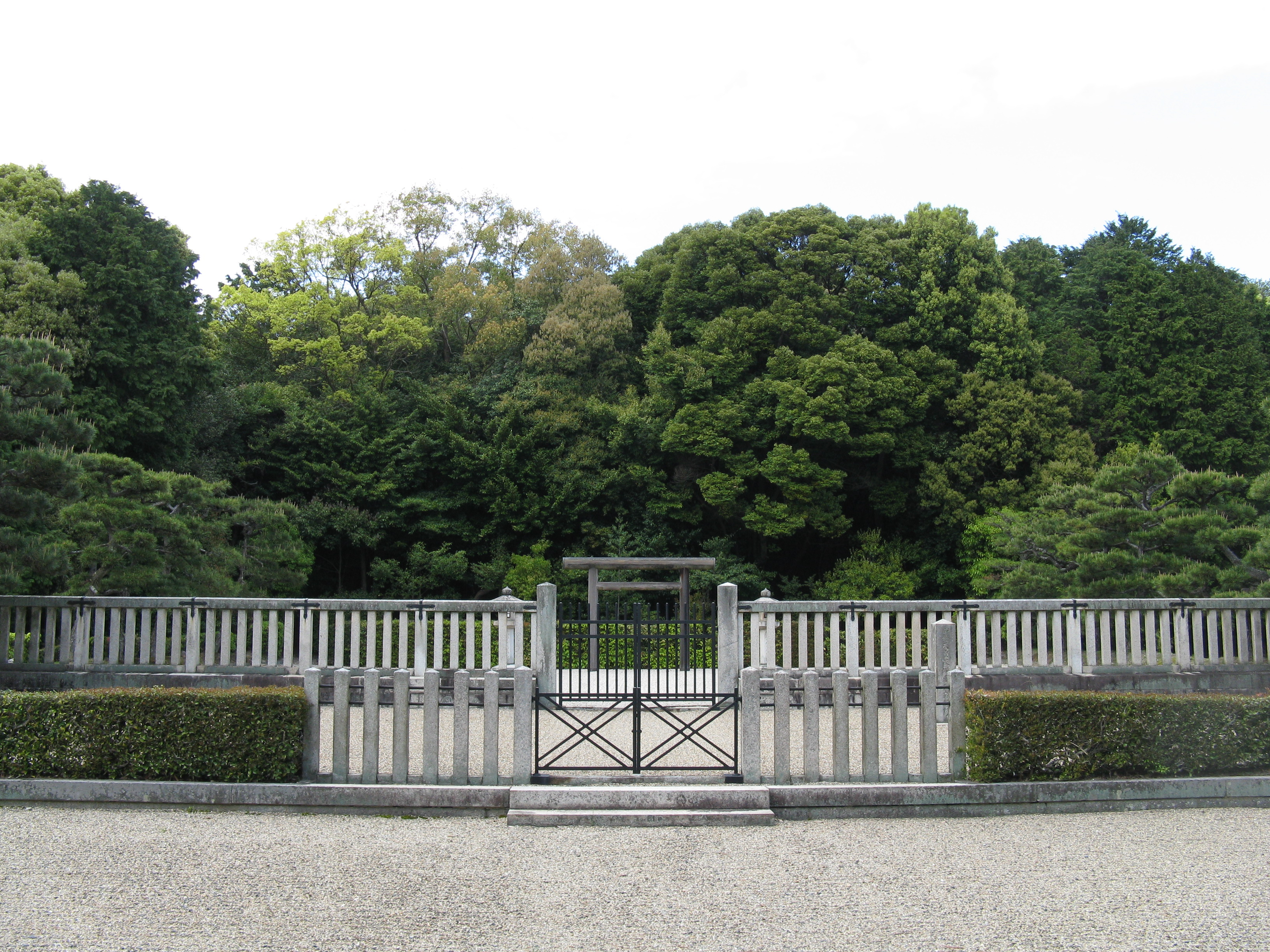
Memorial Shinto shrine and mausoleum honoring Emperor Seimu

Emperor Seimu is regarded by historians as a "legendary Emperor" as there is insufficient material available for further verification and study. His existence is open to debate given this lack of information. If Seimu did exist, there is no evidence to suggest that the title tennō was used during the time period to which his reign has been assigned. It is much more likely that he was a chieftain, or local clan leader, and the polity he ruled would have only encompassed a small portion of modern-day Japan. The name Seimu-tennō was more than likely assigned to him posthumously by later generations. His name might have been regularized centuries after the lifetime ascribed to Seimu, possibly during the time in which legends about the origins of the imperial dynasty were compiled as the chronicles known today as the Kojiki. There is a possibility that Seimu ruled during the first half of the 4th century when Japan became a unified state ruled from Yamato, making these accounts "not improbable".

While the actual site of Seimu's grave is not known, the Emperor is traditionally venerated at a memorial Shinto shrine (misasagi) at Nara. The Imperial Household Agency designates this location as Seimu's mausoleum, and is formally named Saki no Tatanami no misasagi. Outside of the Kiki, the reign of Emperor Kinmei (Note: The 29th Emperor) (c. 509 – 571 AD) is the first for which contemporary historiography has been able to assign verifiable dates. The conventionally accepted names and dates of the early Emperors were not confirmed as "traditional" though, until the reign of Emperor Kanmu (Note: Kanmu was the 50th sovereign of the imperial dynasty) between 737 and 806 AD.

== See also ==
- Emperor of Japan
- List of Emperors of Japan
- Imperial cult

== Notes ==
Regnal titles
Preceded by Emperor Keikō	Legendary Emperor of Japan; 131–190 (traditional dates)	Succeeded by Emperor Chūai
