= Himikoko =

King of Kununokuni

Himikoko (卑弥弓呼; also spelled 卑彌弓呼) was the king of Kununokuni.

== Life ==
Little is known about the life of Himikoko as he is briefly mentioned in the Records of Wei. The little information that is known suggests that he was not on good terms with Himiko, the reigning queen of Yamatai. Himiko had become the Queen of Yamatai after a civil war, and led a generally peaceful reign. However, there was a brief interlude within this peace in which Himiko, and Himikoko got into a disagreement, and Himikoko attacked Yamatai, to which he lost. It is here where Himikoko is dropped from the narrative of the Records of Wei, and little information exists about him.
