= Yasakairi-hime =

Yasakairi-hime 八坂入媛命

Empress consort of Japan
- Tenure: July 122–132

Empress dowager of Japan
- Tenure: appointed in 132
- Died: after 132
- Spouse: Emperor Keikō
- Issue: Emperor Seimu
- House: Imperial House of Japan
- Father: Yasakairihiko no Mikoto

Yasakairi-hime (八坂入媛命) was empress consort of Japan from 122 to 132, and later empress dowager from 132 until her death. Her father was Yasakairihiko no Mikoto, and her grandfather was Emperor Sujin.

== Life ==
Yasakairi-hime's father was a governor of a province, and she and her sister, Otohime were said to be very beautiful. In 122, Emperor Keikō's wife, Harima no Inabi no Ōiratsume died. After her death, the Emperor visited the province that her father was the governor of, and met his two daughters, Yasakairi-hime, and Otohime. While both were beautiful, the Emperor thought Yasakairi-hime was especially beautiful, and so he took her as his wife instead of Otohime. In July of 122, she was made empress consort of Japan. She was also the birth mother of Emperor Seimu. In 132 the Emperor died. Upon his death, his son became the Emperor and she became the Empress Dowager.

== Notes ==
Japanese royalty
Preceded by Harima no Inabi no Ōiratsume	Empress consort of Japan; 122–132	Succeeded by Okinagatarashi-hime
Preceded by Mimaki-hime	Empress dowager of Japan appointed in 132	Succeeded by Futajiiri-hime
