= Emperor Chūai =

Legendary emperor of Japan

Emperor Chūai 仲哀天皇
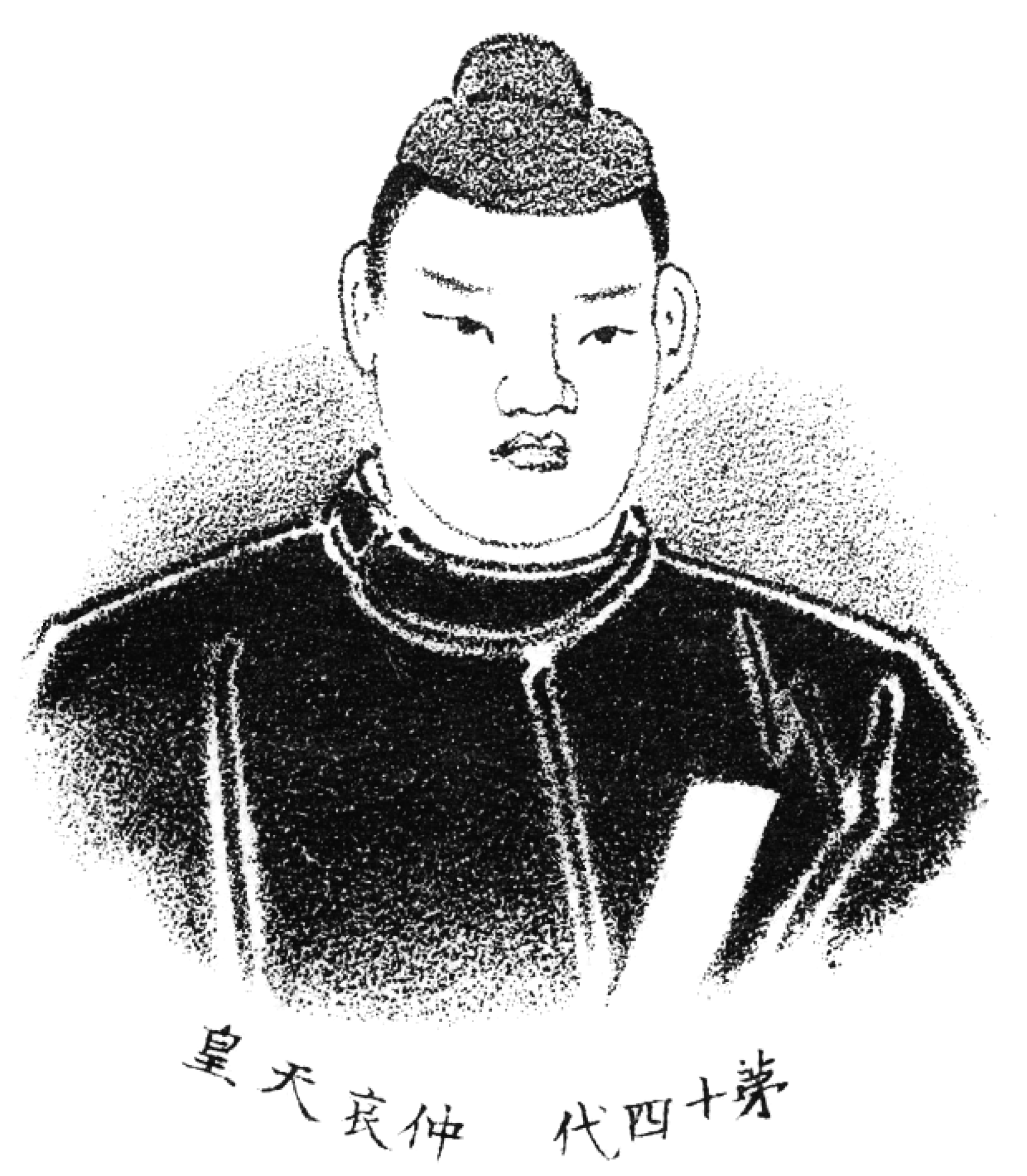

Emperor of Japan
- Reign: 192–200 (traditional)
- Predecessor: Seimu
- Successor: Jingū (de facto) (Note: Jingū's reign as Empress is now confined to legends rather than fact. Modern historians have labeled her as an "Empress regent", who was the de facto ruler until Homutawake (Ōjin) became emperor.); Ōjin (de jure) (Note: Ōjin officially became emperor in 270 AD.)
- Born: Tarashinakatsuhiko (足仲彦尊); 149
- Died: 200 (aged 50–51)
- Burial: Ega no Naganu no nishi no misasagi (恵我長野西陵) (Nara)
- Spouse: Okinagatarashihime-no-Mikoto
- Issue among others...: Emperor Ōjin
Posthumous name
- Chinese-style shigō: Emperor Chūai (仲哀天皇) Japanese-style shigō: Tarashinakatsuhiko no Sumeramikoto (足仲彦天皇)
- House: Imperial House of Japan
- Father: Yamato Takeru
- Mother: Futaji Irihime

Emperor Chūai (仲哀天皇, Chūai-tennō), also known as Tarashinakatsuhiko no Sumeramikoto (足仲彦天皇) was the 14th legendary Emperor of Japan, according to the traditional order of succession. Both the Kojiki, and the Nihon Shoki (collectively known as the Kiki) record events that took place during Chūai's alleged lifetime. Chūai is the first monarch to ascend the throne who was not a son of the previous Emperor as the latter's only child died young. He is also noted for having his capital in Kyushu, rather than Yamato like his predecessors. The records state that Chūai had a wife named Okinagatarashihime-no-Mikoto (later Jingū), and 2 consorts that all bore him 4 children.

Chūai's reign is conventionally considered to have been from 192 to 200 AD. The events leading up to the Emperor's death have been subject to interpretation as they involve a vengeful Kami (spirit) indirectly killing Chūai. This event allegedly occurred after the Emperor disrespectfully scoffed at the Kami's request. His wife Jingū carried out the Kami's request which was to invade Korea, but this has since been considered legendary rather than factual. While the location of Chūai's grave (if any) is unknown, he is traditionally venerated at a memorial Shinto tomb, and at a Hachiman shrine.

Modern historians have come to the conclusion that the title of "Emperor" and the name "Chūai" were used by later generations to describe this legendary Emperor. It has also been proposed that Chūai actually reigned much later than he is attested. Emperor Chūai is traditionally listed as the last Emperor of the Yayoi period.

== Legendary narrative ==
The Japanese have traditionally accepted this sovereign's historical existence, and a mausoleum (misasagi) for Chūai is currently maintained. The following information available is taken from the pseudo-historical Kojiki and Nihon Shoki, which are collectively known as Kiki (記紀) or Japanese chronicles. These chronicles include legends and myths, as well as potential historical facts that have since been exaggerated and/or distorted over time. The records state that Chūai was born to Futaji no Iri Hime sometime in 149 AD, and was given the name Tarashinakahiko or Tarashinakatsuhiko (足仲彦天皇). Chūai's father was allegedly the legendary prince, Yamato Takeru. He was the first Emperor who was not the child of the previous Emperor, being instead the nephew of his predecessor Emperor Seimu. The title of Crown Prince was given to him by his uncle before his death in 190 AD, two years later Chūai became the next Emperor. Unlike his predecessors who had maintained their capitals in Yamato Province, the records state his palace was first located on the northern shores of Shimonoseki Strait, then south of that in Kyushu.

Emperor Chūai is described in the Kiki as having been ten feet tall, with "a countenance of perfect beauty". He had one wife who was named Okinagatarashi (aka Jingū), and two consorts who all bore him four children. During the start of his reign, he made progress to modern day Tsuruga, and led an expedition to Kii where he heard news of a revolt. Jingū accompanied him to the west to fight against a tribe in Tsukushi (located in modern-day Fukuoka Prefecture) called Kumaso. On the eve of battle though, his wife was suddenly possessed by some unknown kami who advised Chūai to invade and conquer Korea. The Kami gave the reasoning that the Kumaso were not worthy of "his steel". Chūai refused with scorn for a number of reasons which included giving up a military campaign, and doubting that such a land even existed. It is said that the Kami was so enraged by this disrespect, that Emperor Chūai was later killed in a battle that beat down his troops.

The death of the Emperor was kept quiet by Jingū, who vanquished the Kumaso soon afterwards in a fit of revenge. Jingū then respected the wishes of the Kami by invading Korea, and subjugated the eastern Korean kingdom of Shiragi. The other two Korean kingdoms at the time voluntarily submitted, and Jingū ascended to the throne as Empress. Jingū's occupation of the Korean Peninsula, and reign as Empress are now considered to be legendary rather than factual. The modern traditional view is that Chūai's son (Homutawake) became the next Emperor after Jingū acted as a regent. She would have been de facto ruler in the interim.

== Known information ==
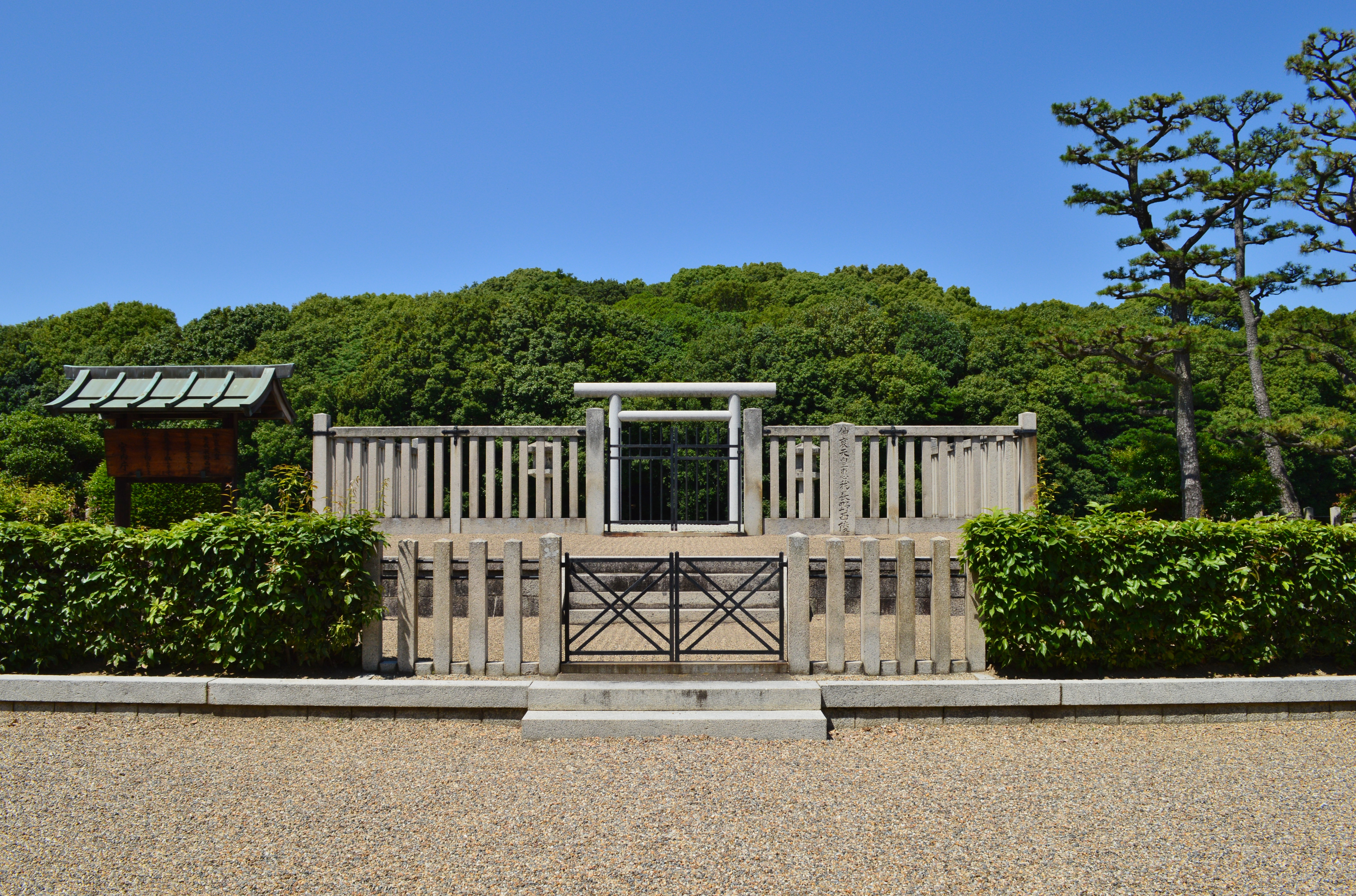
Okamisanzai Kofun the possible resting spot of Emperor Chuai

Emperor Chūai is regarded by historians as a "legendary Emperor" as there is insufficient material available for further verification and study. The lack of this information has made his very existence open to debate. There is no evidence to suggest that the title tennō was used during the time to which Chūai's reign has been assigned. It is certainly possible that he was a chieftain or local clan leader, and that the polity he ruled would have only encompassed a small portion of modern-day Japan. The name Chūai-tennō was more than likely assigned to him posthumously by later generations. His name might have been regularized centuries after the lifetime ascribed to Chūai, possibly during the time in which legends about the origins of the imperial dynasty were compiled as the chronicles known today as the Kojiki.

The manner in which Chūai died has since been broken down to at least two theories. In his book Confucianism O - Z, professor Xinzhong Yao notes that it is possible the late Emperor could have succumbed to illness rather than death on the battlefield. Sources which include Yao, Francis Brinkley, and Kikuchi Dairoku also cite the enemy arrow scenario. While the actual site of Chūai's grave is not known, the Emperor is traditionally venerated at a memorial Shinto shrine (misasagi) at Nara. The Imperial Household Agency designates this location as Chūai's mausoleum, and is formally named Ega no Naganu no nishi no misasagi. The Kami (spirit) of Chūai is also enshrined at the Tamukeyama Hachiman Shrine in Nara. Chūai is traditionally listed as the last Emperor of the Yayoi period, who could have in reality ruled in the 4th century. The next era is known as the Kofun period, where more is known about the Emperors based on modern day archaeological evidence.

Outside of the Kiki, the reign of Emperor Kinmei (Note: The 29th Emperor) (c. 509 – 571 AD) is the first for which contemporary historiography has been able to assign verifiable dates. The conventionally accepted names and dates of the early Emperors were not confirmed as "traditional" though, until the reign of Emperor Kanmu (Note: Kanmu was the 50th sovereign of the imperial dynasty) between 737 and 806 AD.

== Consorts and children ==
Empress: Okinagatarashi-hime (気長足姫尊), later Empress Jingu, Prince Okinaga no sukune's daughter

- Prince Homutawake (誉田別命), later Emperor Ōjin

Consort: Ōnakatsu-hime (大中姫命), Prince Hikohitoōe's daughter (Emperor Keiko's son)

- Prince Kagosaka (麛坂皇子; d.201)
- Prince Oshikuma (忍熊皇子; d.201)

Consort: Oto-hime (弟媛), Ōsakanushi's daughter

- Prince Homuyawake (誉屋別皇子)

== See also ==
- Emperor of Japan
- List of Emperors of Japan
- Imperial cult

== Notes ==
Regnal titles
Preceded by Emperor Seimu	Legendary Emperor of Japan; 192–200 (traditional dates)	Succeeded by Emperor Ōjin
