= Danpusan Kofun =

Ancient burial ground in Atsuta-ku, Nagoya, Japan

Dampusan Kofun
- 断夫山古墳 (Japanese)
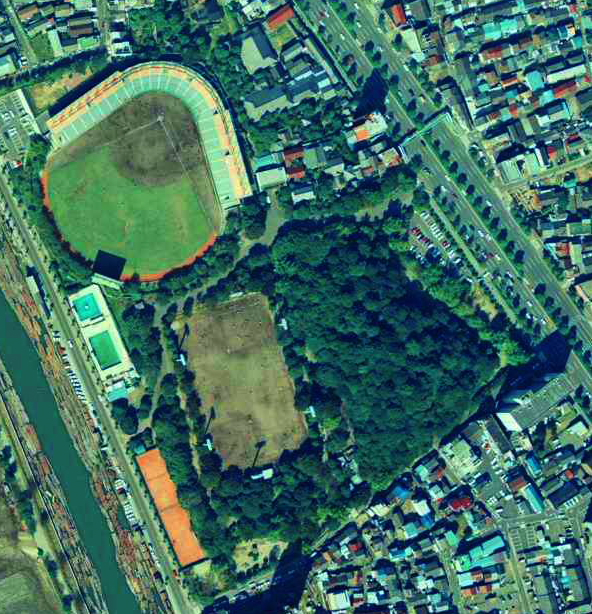
- Dampusan Kofun with Atsuta Jingu Park

- Dampusan Kofun Danpusan Kofun (Japan)
- 35°07′51″N 136°54′11″E
- Type: kofun
- Periods: Kofun period
- Location: Atsuta-ku, Nagoya, Japan
- Region: Tōkai region

History
- Built: 6th century AD

Site notes
- Public access: No

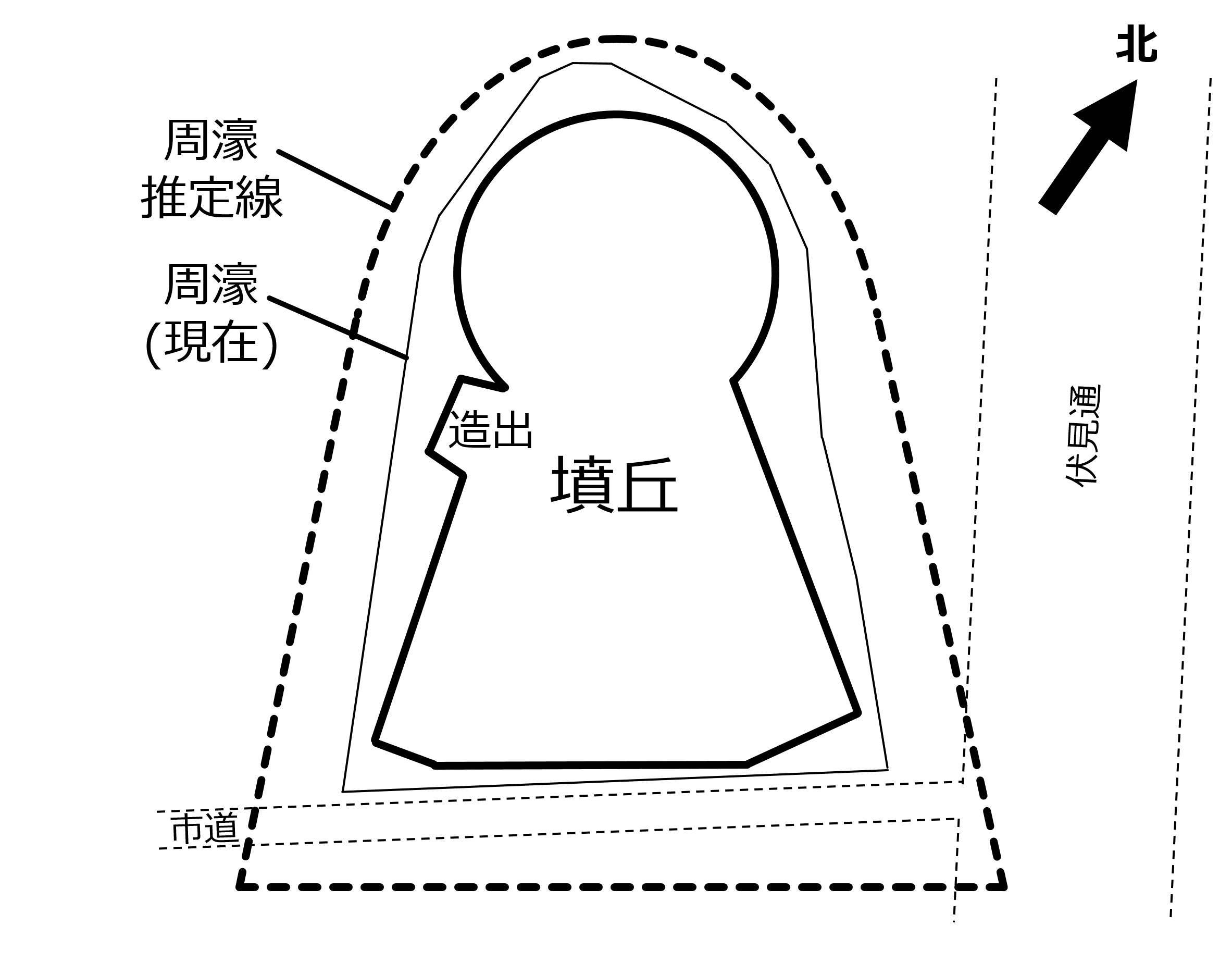
Sketch of Danpusan Kofun

The Dampusan Kofun (断夫山古墳) is a large keyhole-shaped kofun burial mound located within the grounds of the Atsuta Shrine complex in the Hayata neighborhood of Atsuta-ku, Nagoya, Japan. The tumulus was designated a National Historic Site of Japan in 1987. Per legend, the tumulus is the tomb is Miyazuhime, the wife of Prince Yamato Takeru, whose purported grave is located nearby.

== Overview ==
The largest zenpō-kōen-fun (前方後円墳) in the Tōkai region of Japan, the Dampusan Kofun is shaped like a keyhole, having one square end and one circular end, when viewed from above. The tumulus has a total length of 151 meters, with the posterior circular portion containing the burial chamber having a diameter of 80 meters and a height of 13 meters. The anterior rectangular portion has a width of 116 meters and height of 16.2 meters. The posterior circular portion is actually thought to have been originally trapezoidal, and built in three tiers like a stepped pyramid, with lines of cylindrical haniwa on each tier. The presence of a large number of rounded river boulders indicates that the surface may have originally been paved with stones (fukiishi). In addition, a square platform was built between the front and rear portions, which was possibly a stage for use in ceremonies. Numerous fragments of cylindrical haniwa and Sue ware pottery have been recovered from this area. The tomb was originally surrounded by at least one moat which can clearly been seen in Meiji period maps, but the urban encroachment of the surrounding area in the post-World War II era has obliterated most traces.

On the tumulus, a row of very large cylindrical haniwa were recovered from the lower part of the posterior circular portion, along with a small amount of morning glory-shaped and figurative haniwa. The cylindrical haniwa exhibit traces of both Haji ware and Sue ware qualities. Some of the excavated haniwa are displayed at the Nagoya City Museum. In addition, according to historical records, a large amount of Sue pottery was excavated from the tumulus, but most are now missing, and all of the pieces that have been handed down to the present are small pieces of unknown shape, which are stored in the Toyota City Museum of Local History and the Nagoya City Miharashidai Archaeological Museum.

The interior of the burial mound has not been excavated by modern methods. The name or rank of the person buried in the tomb is unknown. Per legend, the tumulus is the tomb of Miyazuhime, the wife of Prince Yamato Takeru, whose purported grave is located nearby. Another theory is that the tomb is that of a powerful chieftain of the Owari clan, perhaps Owari no Kusaka, who is mentioned in the Kojiki and Nihon Shoki chronicles of the Nara period, and whose daughter married the semi-legendary Emperor Keitai and who was the mother of Emperor Ankan and Emperor Senka. From its construction method and the recovered artifacts, the tumulus is believed to date from the early 6th century AD, and to have had a strong connection to the Yamato kingdom. Many of these artifacts are currently preserved at the Anthropological Museum of Nanzan University.

The Dampusan Kofun was under the management of Atsuta Shrine until World War II. According to an official cadastral map attached to a land register in 1885, the anterior portion is almost preserved, but one-third of the northwest part of the posterior circular portion is missing along with the moat. It seems that this area was used as a field. The current shape was restored when the kofun was designated as a historic site, and there is doubt as to whether the restoration is accurate. Likewise, the moat now surrounding the tumulus was a restoration attempted based on the 1885 map, and the actual moat had a width much larger than the modern restoration. Based on what is now known of the original moat dimensions, the actual length of the tumulus can be estimated at 160 meters. In addition, most major kofun in this region had double moats, and there is some evidence that a second shield-shaped moat once existed outside the current inner moat.

After the war, kofun came under the control of Nagoya city until 1980, when it was taken over by the Aichi Prefectural government. it is about a 5-minute walk from Jingunishi Station on the Nagoya Municipal Subway Meijo Line.

Total length
151 meters (estimated restoration of about 160 meters):
Anterior rectangular portion
116 meters wide. 16 meters high, 3-tier
Constriction width
25 x 17 meters
Posterior circular portion
80 meter diameter x 13 meters high, 3-tiers

== Gallery ==
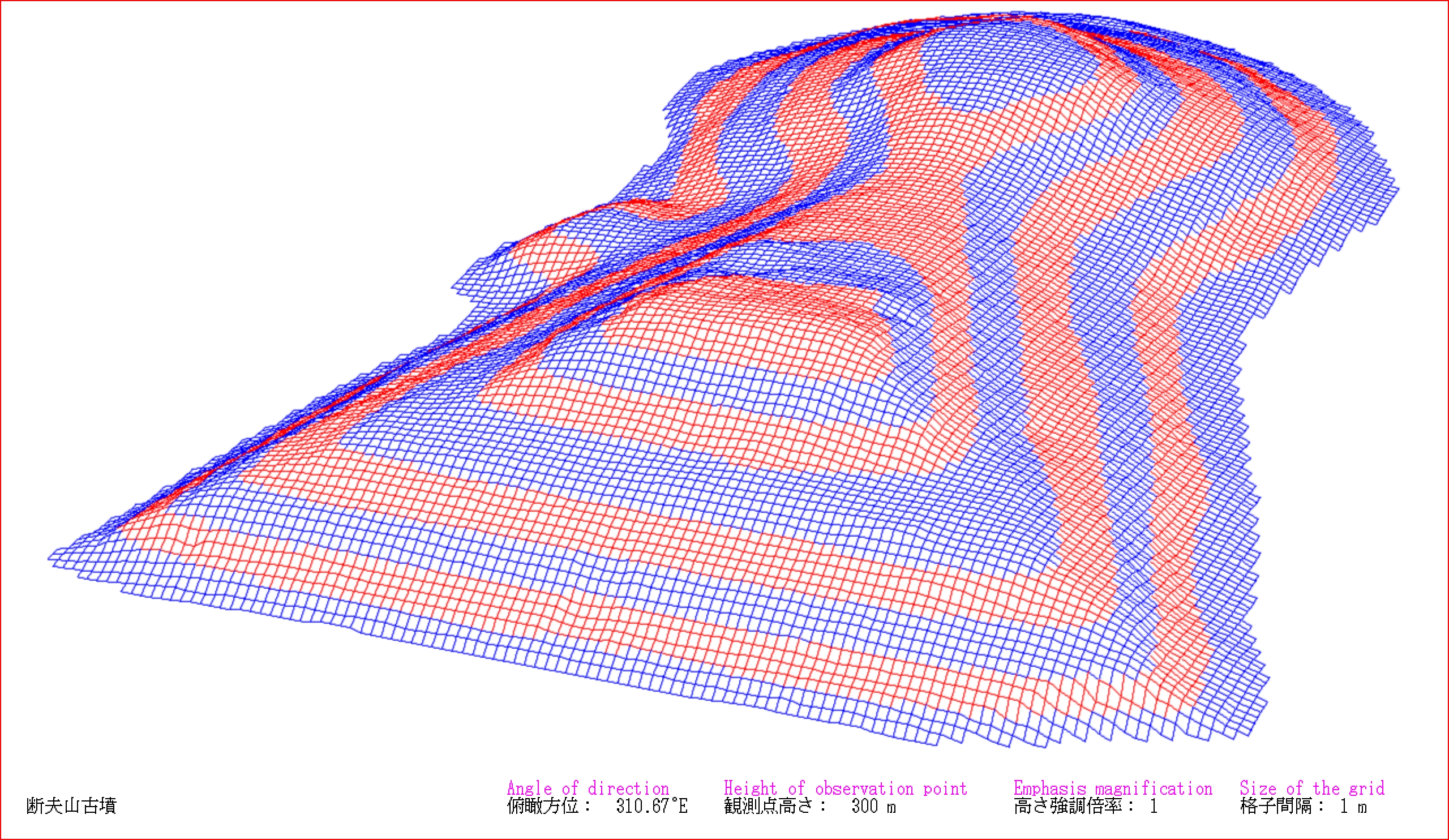
Danpusan Kofun drawn in 3DCG

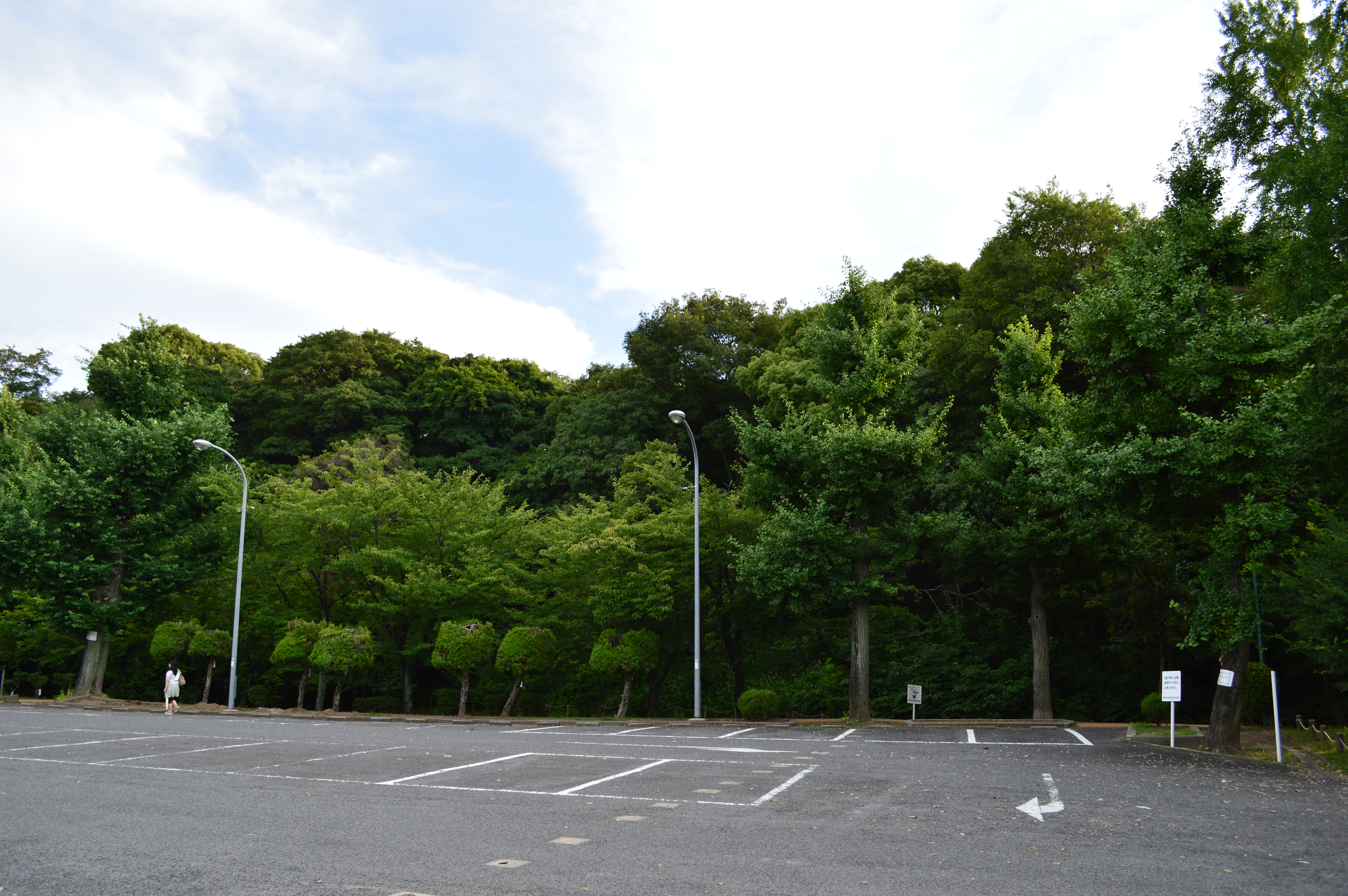
Panoramic view

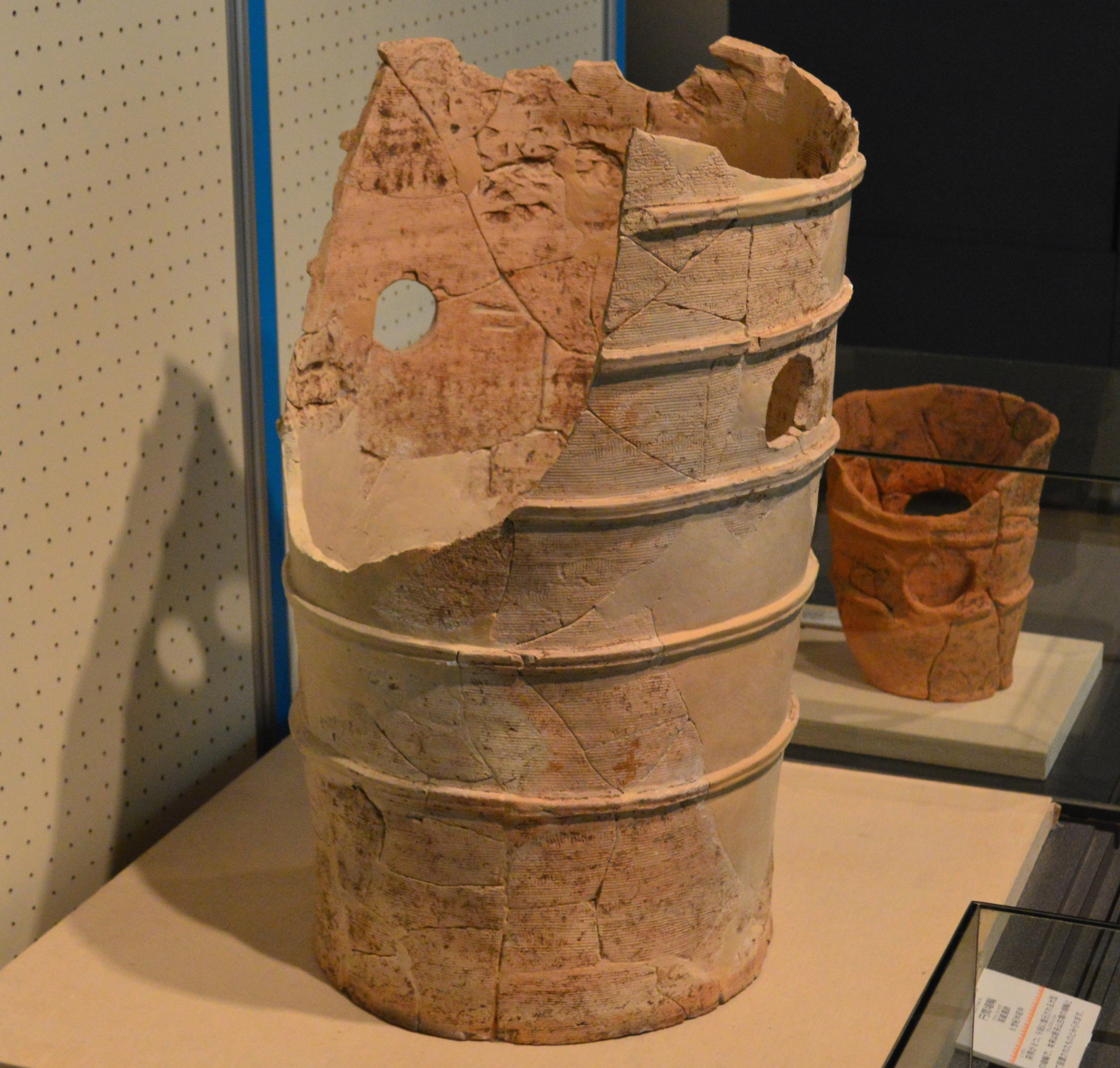
Haniwa excavated from Danpusan Kofun

== See also ==
- List of Historic Sites of Japan (Aichi)
- Atsuta Shrine
