= Hakkengū =

Shinto shrine in Nagoya, Aichi, Japan

Hakkengū 八剣宮
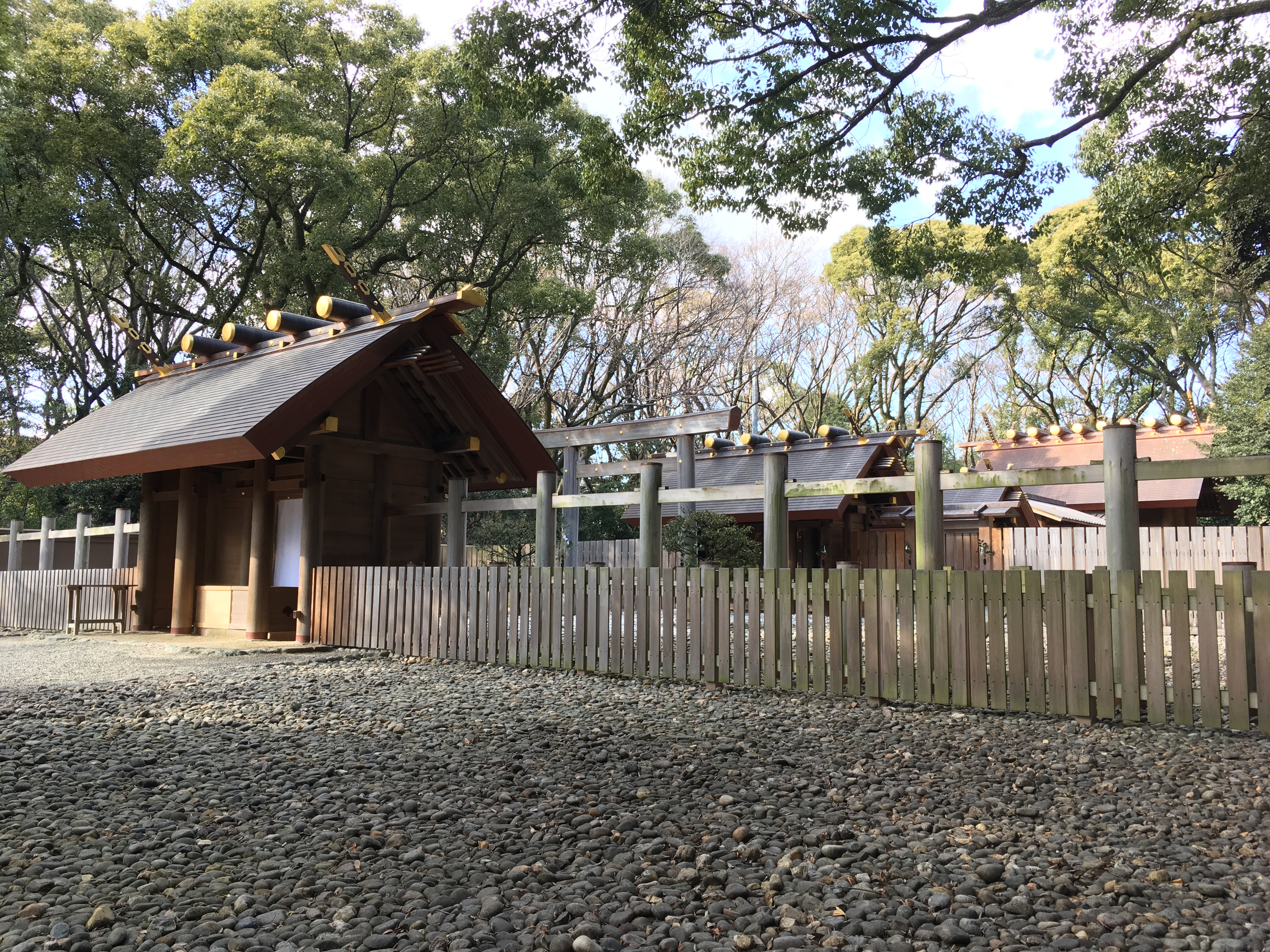
- Atsuta Shrine betsugū Hakkengū

- Location within Japan

Religion
- Affiliation: Shinto
- Deity: Atsuta no Ōkami; Amaterasu; Susanoo; Yamato Takeru; Miyazu-hime; Takeinadane

Location
- Location: 1-1-1, Jingu, Atsuta-ku; Nagoya, Aichi 456-8585
- Interactive map of Hakkengū 八剣宮
- Coordinates: 35°07′25″N 136°54′29″E

Architecture
- Style: Shinmei-zukuri
- Established: 708

Hakkengū (Japanese: 八剣宮) is a Shinto shrine established in 708 located in Atsuta-ku, Nagoya, Aichi Prefecture, in Japan. It is the betsugū (auxiliary shrine) of the Atsuta Shrine. The legendary sword Kusanagi no Tsurugi, one of the three Imperial Regalia of Japan, is worshipped as the shintai of the shrine.

== History ==
Hakkengū was established in 708. From the architectural style to the annual festivals and rituals, everything is done according to Atsuta Shrine's hongū (main shrine). Since ancient times, the samurai have been deeply worshipped.

In 1575, Oda Nobunaga and his eldest son Kankurō encamped in Atsuta during the Battle of Nagashino. Observing that Hakkengū had deteriorated to the point that it had lost its essential character, Nobunaga ordered the shrine to be repaired by his chief carpenter Okabe Mataemon.

In 1599, shōgun Tokugawa Ieyasu repaired the haiden (hall of worship) and the shrine corridors and walls. In 1686, shōgun Tokugawa Tsunayoshi rebuilt the main shrine.

== Deities ==
6 deities are worshipped at the Hakkengū shrine.

- Atsuta no Ōkami
- Amaterasu Ōmikami
- Susanoo no Mikoto
- Yamato Takeru no Mikoto
- Miyazu-hime
- Takeinadane
