= Yaizu Shrine =

Shinto shrine in Shizuoka Prefecture, Japan

Yaizu Jinja 焼津神社
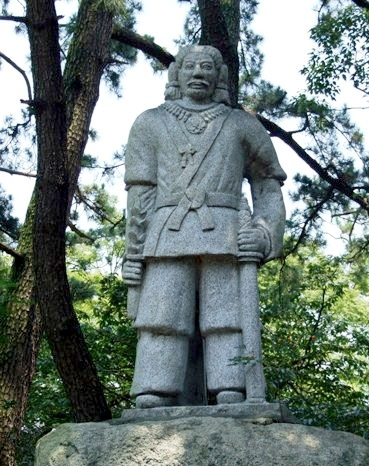
- Statue of Yamato Takeru at Yaizu Jinja

- Location within Shizuoka Prefecture Location within Japan

Religion
- Affiliation: Shinto
- Deity: Yamato Takeru no Mikoto and 3 followers
- Festival: August 13

Location
- Location: 2-7-1 Yaizu-chō, Yaizu, Shizuoka, 425-0026
- Interactive map of Yaizu Jinja 焼津神社
- Coordinates: 34°51′54″N 138°18′49″E

Architecture
- Style: Nagare-zukuri
- Established: c.409 AD

Website
- Official website

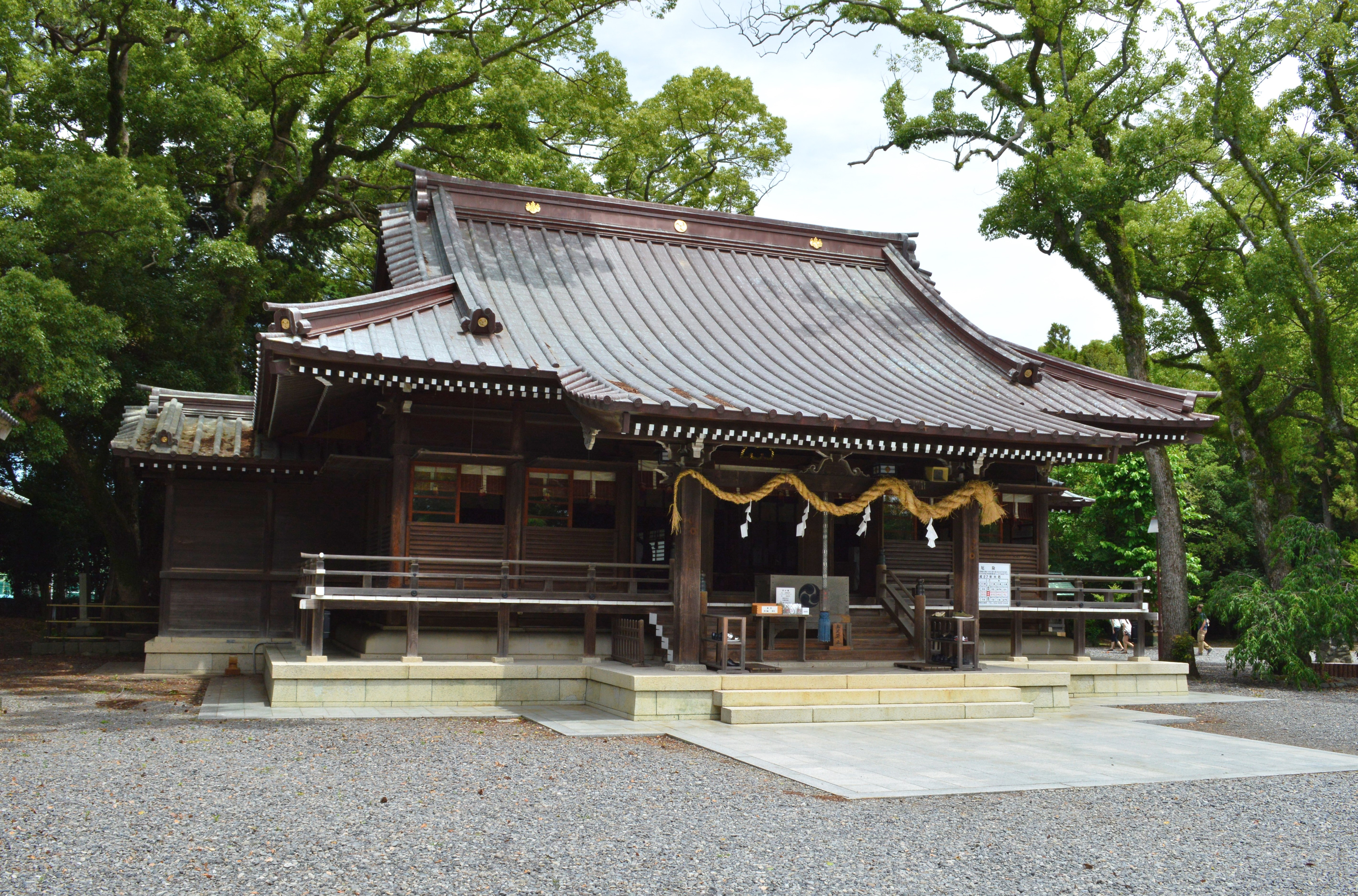
Haiden of Yaizu Jinja

Yaizu Jinja (焼津神社) is a Shinto shrine in the city of Yaizu in Shizuoka Prefecture, Japan. The shrine is also referred to as the Irie Daimyojin (入江大明神).The main festival of the shrine is annually on August 13.

== Enshrined kami ==
The primary kami of Yaizu is the Yamato Takeru (日本武尊), the legendary 4th century AD prince of the imperial dynasty, son of Emperor Keikō, whose legends are detailed in the Japanese chronicles Kojiki and Nihon Shoki.

Per one of the legends in the Yamato Takeru cycle, Emperor Keikō sent him to the eastern provinces, whose Kuni no miyatsuko had rebelled against the imperial court. His enemies attempted to kill him by setting fire to a grassy plain, but he escaped by using the powers of his magical sword, the Kusanagi no tsurugi and two magic stones. The sword, one of the Imperial Regalia of Japan is kept at Atsuta Shrine in Nagoya, along with one of the magic stones. Yaizu Jinja claims to have the remaining stone, as well as to have been built on the location of Yamato Takeru's miraculous escape.

The remaining three kami enshrined at Yaizu Jinja are the three main retainers of Yamato Takeru during his voyage east, including his brother-in-law Kibi Takehiko no Mikoto (吉備武彦命), Otomo no Takehi no Mikoto (大伴武日連命) and Nanatsukahagi no Mikoto (七束脛命)

Yaizu Jinja also has numerous small subsidiary shrines dedicated to various kami within its precincts.

== History ==
The date of Yaizu Jinja's foundation is unknown. Per shrine tradition it was founded in 409 AD. In the early Heian period Engishiki records dated 927 AD, the shrine is mentioned as one of four shrines in Mashizu District of Suruga Province. The shrine was patronized by the Imagawa clan in the Muromachi period, and given revenues of 500 koku for its upkeep. This was reduced to a 70 koku stipend in the Edo period by the Tokugawa shogunate. In 1883, Yaizu Jinja was recognized as a “Prefectural Shrine” under the Modern system of ranked Shinto shrines within the State Shinto system.

== Festivals ==
- Aramatsuri (annually on August 12–13) is the shrine's main festival. It involves a procession with two mikoshi and is considered one of the roughest festivals in the Tōkai region.

== See also ==
- List of Shinto shrines
