= Miyazu-hime =

Japanese deity (kami)

- Major cult centre: Atsuta Shrine

Genealogy
- Spouse: Yamato Takeru

Miyazu-hime (宮簀媛) is a figure of Japanese legend and kami said to have been married to Yamato Takeru. According to legend, Yamato Takeru entrusted the Kusanagi no Tsurugi to her before departing to the mountains where he was killed. Grieving his death, she built a shrine in Atsuta and enshrined the blade there, which became the origin of Atsuta Shrine.
