= Atsuta Shrine =

Shinto shrine in Japan

Atsuta Shrine 熱田神宮
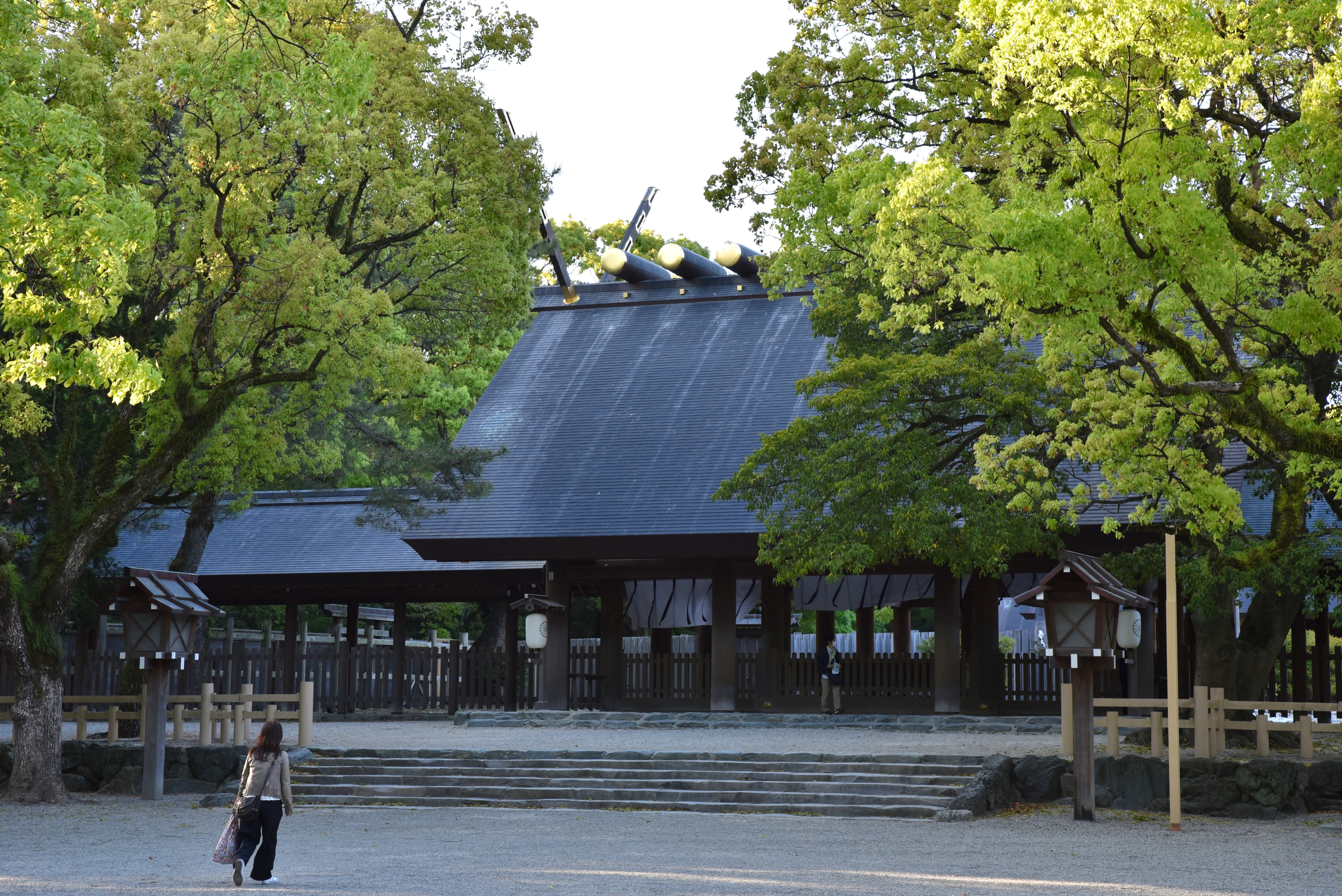
- The haiden, or prayer hall, 2019

- Location within Nagoya Location within Aichi Prefecture Location within Japan

Religion
- Affiliation: Shinto
- Deity: Atsuta no Ōkami; Amaterasu; Susanoo; Yamatotakeru; Miyazu-hime; Takeinadane
- Festivals: Atsuta-sai; June 5th
- Type: Chokusaisha; Beppyo jinja, Shikinaisya; Owari no Kuni sannomiya (Former kanpeitaisha)

Location
- Location: 1-1-1, Jingu, Atsuta-ku; Nagoya, Aichi 456-8585

Architecture
- Style: Shinmei-zukuri

Website
- www.atsutajingu.or.jp/eng/index.htm

Atsuta Shrine (熱田神宮, Atsuta-jingū) is a Shinto shrine, home to the sacred sword Kusanagi no Tsurugi, one of the three Imperial Regalia of Japan—traditionally believed to have been established during the reign of Emperor Keikō (reigned 71–130 CE). It is located in Atsuta-ku, Nagoya, Aichi Prefecture in Japan. The shrine is familiarly known as Atsuta-Sama (Venerable Atsuta) or simply as Miya (the Shrine). Since ancient times, it has been especially revered, ranking with the Ise Shrine.

The 200,000-square-metre (2,200,000 sq ft) shrine complex draws over 9 million visitors annually.

== History ==
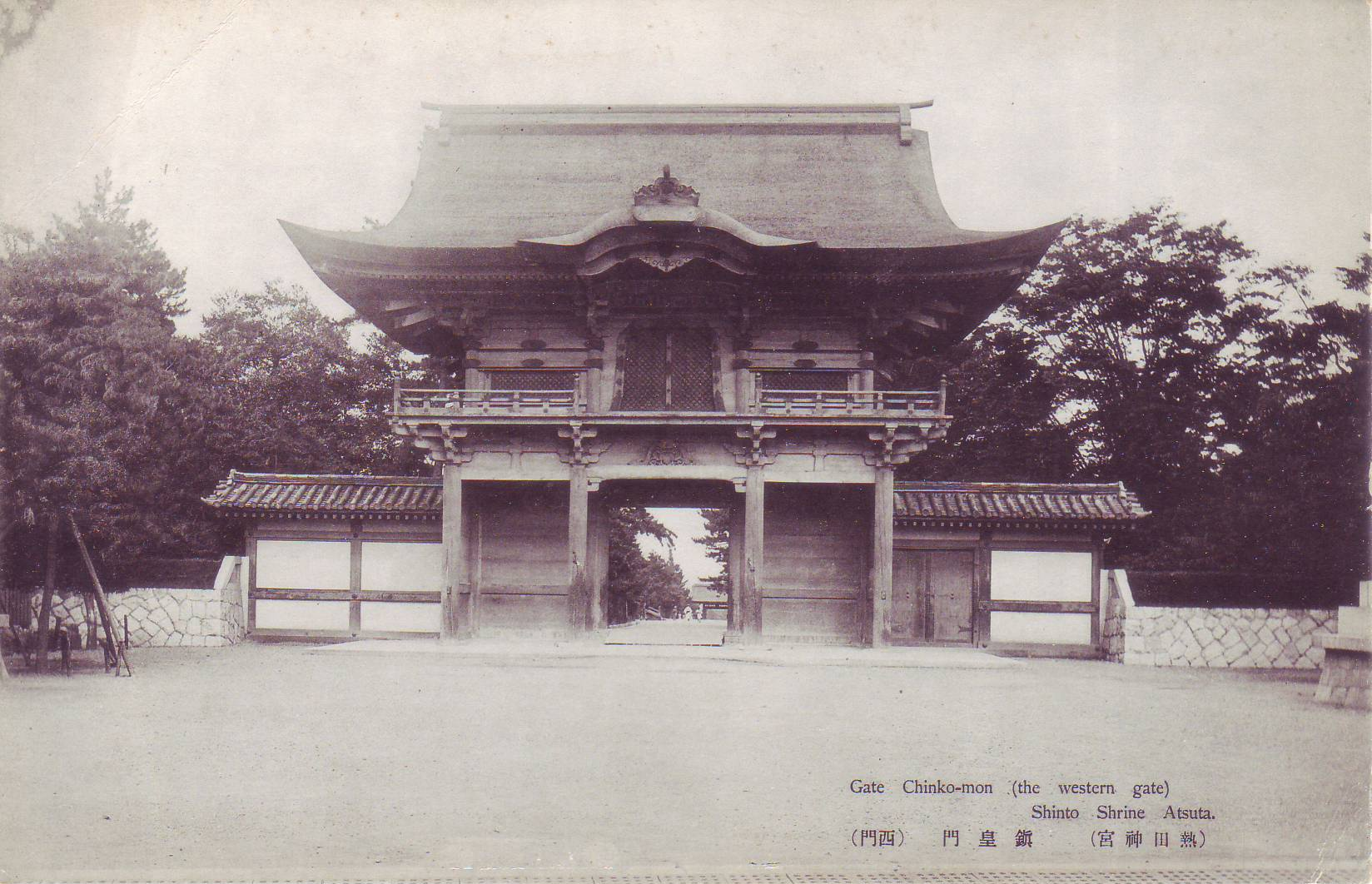
The western gate (Chinkō-mon), registered as a National Treasure and lost during the Pacific War in 1945

The Kojiki explains that Atsuta Shrine was founded to house the Kusanagi no Tsurugi, a legendary sword.

According to traditional sources, Yamato Takeru died in the 43rd year of Emperor Keiko's reign (景行天皇43年, equivalent 113 AD). The possessions of the dead prince were gathered together along with the sword Kusanagi; and his widow venerated his memory in a shrine at her home. Sometime later, these relics and the sacred sword were moved to the current location of the Atsuta Shrine. Nihon Shoki explains that this move occurred in the 51st year of Keiko's reign, but shrine tradition also dates this event in the 1st year of Emperor Chūai's reign.

The Owari clan had established the Atsuta Shrine in 192, and held the position of the shrine's high priest since ancient times, passing it down from generation to generation. However, in 1114, Kazumoto handed the position over to Fujiwara no Suenori, who was from the Fujiwara clan. Since then, the Fujiwara clan became the head of Atsuta Shrine, while the Owari clan stepped down to the position of adjutant chief priest (gongūji).

During the Northern and Southern Courts Period, because it was believed that the Kusanagi no Tsurugi was or had once been housed there, the Atsuta Shrine proved to be a significant site in the struggle between ousted Emperor Go-Daigo (Southern Court) and the new emperor, Takauji Ashikaga (Northern Court). Go-Daigo was a patron to Atsuta Masayoshi, the shrine's attendant, who subsequently fled with him to Mt. Hiei in 1336 and went on to command troops on Go-Daigo's behalf in 1337. In 1335, after rebelling against Go-Daigo, Takauji appointed a new shrine attendant. He later prayed there while advancing on the capital, mimicking the behavior of Minamoto no Yoritomo, who had done the same before founding the Kamakura shogunate.

In 1338, the Southern Court had one more chance to occupy the shrine when Kitabatake Akiie led a large army down from the Southern Court's base on Mount Ryōzen. In the first month of 1338, Akiie also prayed at the shrine. However, he was killed in battle soon after and the Ashikaga cemented their control over Atsuta Shrine.

From 1872 through 1946, Atsuta Shrine was officially designated one of the Kanpei-taisha (官幣大社), meaning that it stood in the first rank of government supported shrines.

The shrine area was originally much larger. To the northeast were vast ricefields that belonged to the shrine, they were later built over in what became Sanbonmatsu-chō (三本松町) and Mutsuno (六野) neighbourhoods, the Jingū Higashi Park (神宮東公園) established in the 1980's is a restoration of greenery to the site.

=== Architecture ===
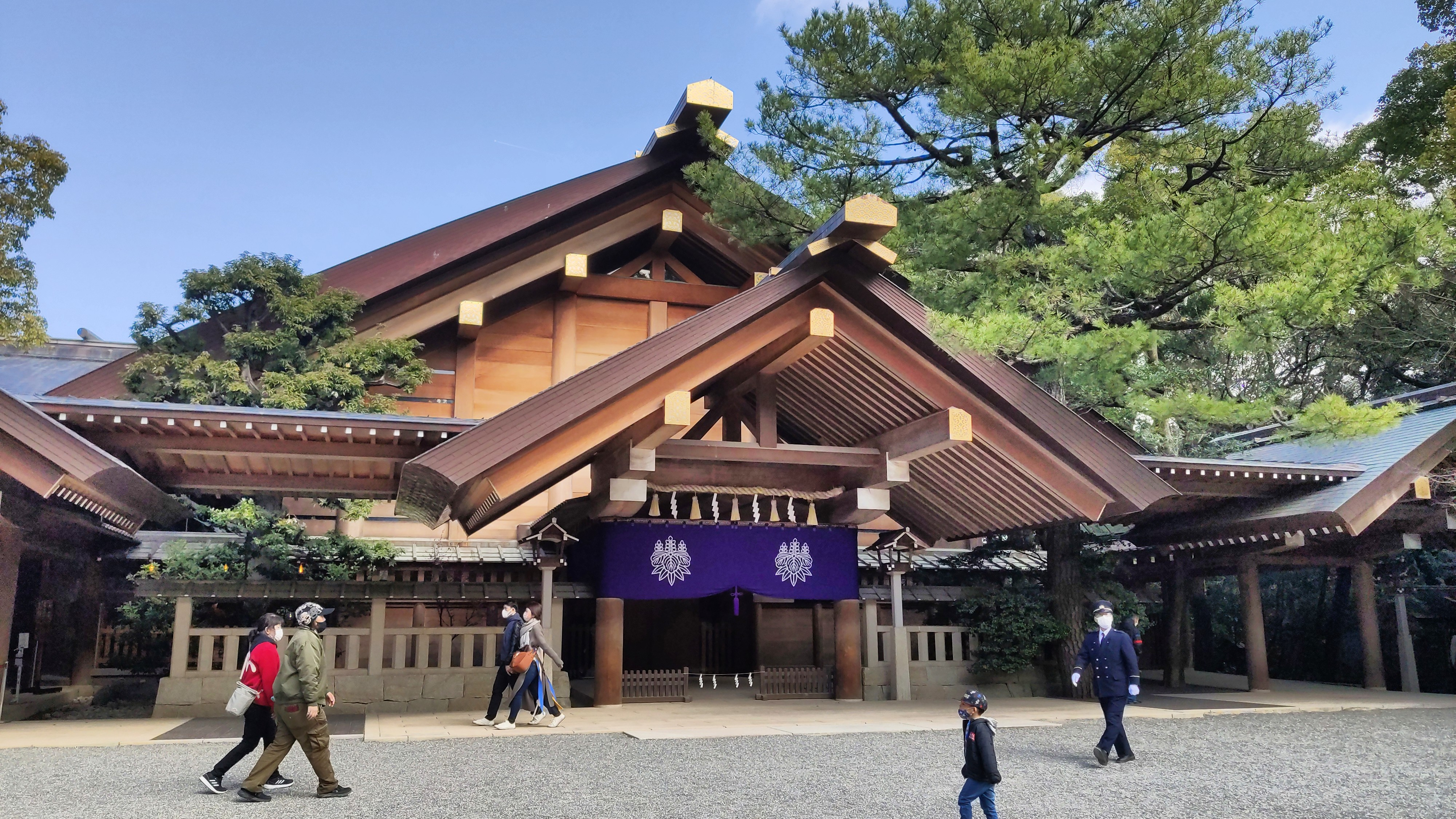
Kaguraden

The shrine's buildings were maintained by donations from a number of benefactors, including well-known Sengoku period figures like Oda Nobunaga, Toyotomi Hideyoshi and the Tokugawas. For example, the Nobunaga-Bei, a 7.4 m high roofed mud wall, was donated to the shrine in 1560 by Nobunaga as a token of gratitude for his victory at the Battle of Okehazama. A wooden gate called Kaijō-mon (海上門 lit. "Sea Gate") was made along with the mud wall. This gate was a National Treasure and was lost during the Pacific war bombings on 17 May 1945. The west gate was a larger wooden structure called Chinkō-mon (鎮皇門) that was used for imperial processions. It was dedicated by Kato Kiyomasa. This gate was also registered as a national treasure, it was lost 29 July 1945 in another air raid. and replaced with a simple wooden torii. The east gate Shunkō-mon (春敲門) was dedicated to Yang Guifei, who according to legend found refuge here. A water spring is also connected to her legend.

In 1893, it was remodeled using the Shinmeizukuri architectural style, the same style used in the building of Ise Shrine. Before a celebration in 1935, the shrine's buildings as well as other facilities were completely rearranged and improved in order to better reflect the history and cultural significance of the shrine.

During the aerial raids of the Pacific War, however, many of Atsuta Shrine's buildings were destroyed by fire. The shrine's main buildings, such as the honden, were reconstructed and completed in 1955. Following the completion of these buildings, construction of other buildings continued on the shrine grounds. In 1966 the Treasure Hall was completed in order to house the shrine's collection of objects, manuscripts and documents.

An augmented reality program has been developed to see structures that have been lost over time.

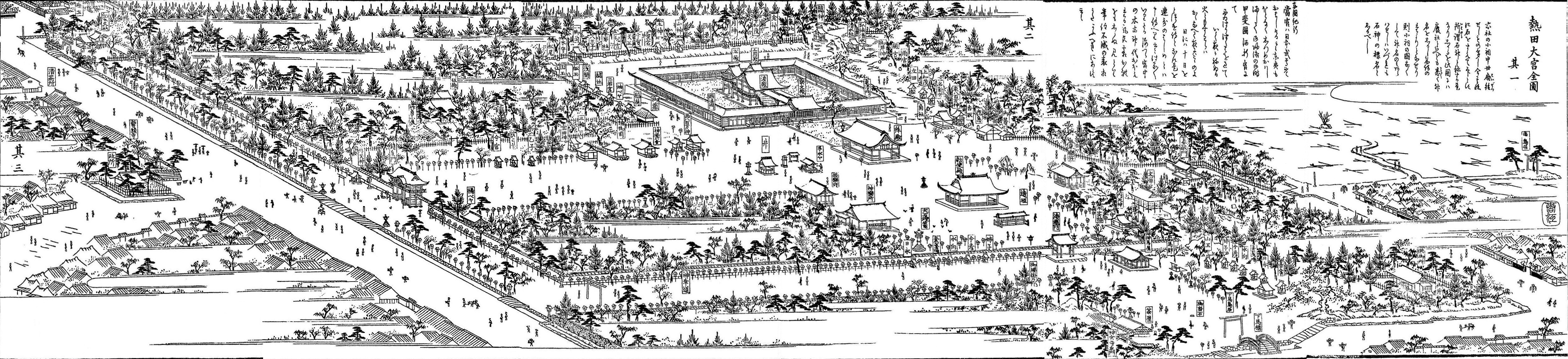
Panoramic print view from the Owari meisho zue depicting the shrine complex in the late Edo period (1844)

== Shinto belief ==
This Shinto shrine is dedicated to the veneration of Atsuta-no-Ōkami. Also enshrined are the "Five Great Gods of Atsuta", all of whom are connected with the legendary narratives of the sacred sword — Amaterasu-Ōmikami, Takehaya Susanoo-no-mikoto, Yamato Takeru-no-mikoto, Miyazu-hime, and Take Inadane-no-mikoto. Among the five deities enshrined at Atsuta, popular devotion has historically focused more heavily on Miyasuhime and her brother Take Inadane-no-mikoto, both closely associated with local Owari clan traditions.

Atsuta is the traditional repository of Kusanagi no Tsurugi, the ancient sword that is considered one of the Three Sacred Treasures of Japan. Central to the Shinto significance of Atsuta Shrine is the sacred sword which is understood to be a gift from Amaterasu Ōmikami. This unique object has represented the authority and stature of Japan's emperors since time immemorial. Kusanagi is imbued with Amaterasu's spirit.

During the reign of Emperor Sujin, duplicate copies of the Imperial regalia were made in order to safeguard the originals from theft. This fear of theft proved to be justified during the reign of Emperor Tenji when the sacred sword was stolen from Atsuta; and it was not to be returned until the reign of Emperor Tenmu. There is also the purported loss of the Kusanagi during the 1185 Battle of Dan-no-ura, where it was presumed lost at sea when the Emperor Antoku committed suicide by drowning together with remnants of the Heike. Although not seen by the general public since that time, it is said to have remained in safekeeping at the shrine up to the present day.

== Treasures ==
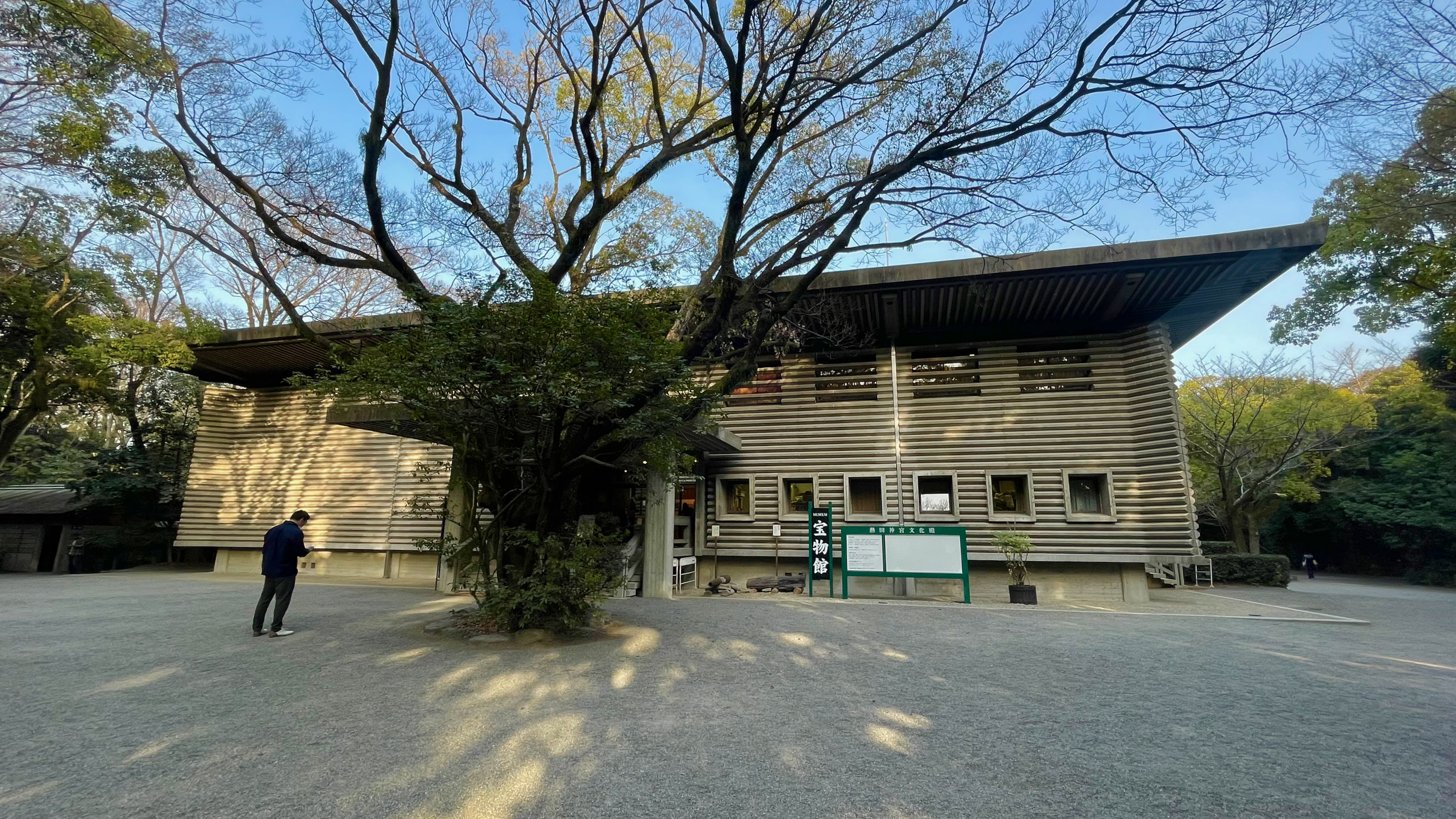
Treasure hall Bunkaden

The shrine's Bunkaden, or treasure hall, houses over 4,000 relics, which include 174 Important Cultural Properties and a dagger that is a designated National Treasure of Japan. Atsuta Jingu Museum preserves and displays a variety of historic material, including the koshinpō (sacred garments, furniture and utensils for use of the enshrined deities). A number of donated mirrors and other objects are held by the shrine, including Bugaku masks and other material associated with ancient court dances. The Bunkaden collection ranges from ancient documents to household articles. Aichi Prefecture has designated 174 items as important cultural assets. The shrine's collection of swords are on display in the Kusanagi-kan built to celebrate the new Reiwa era which began in 2019.

== Festivals ==
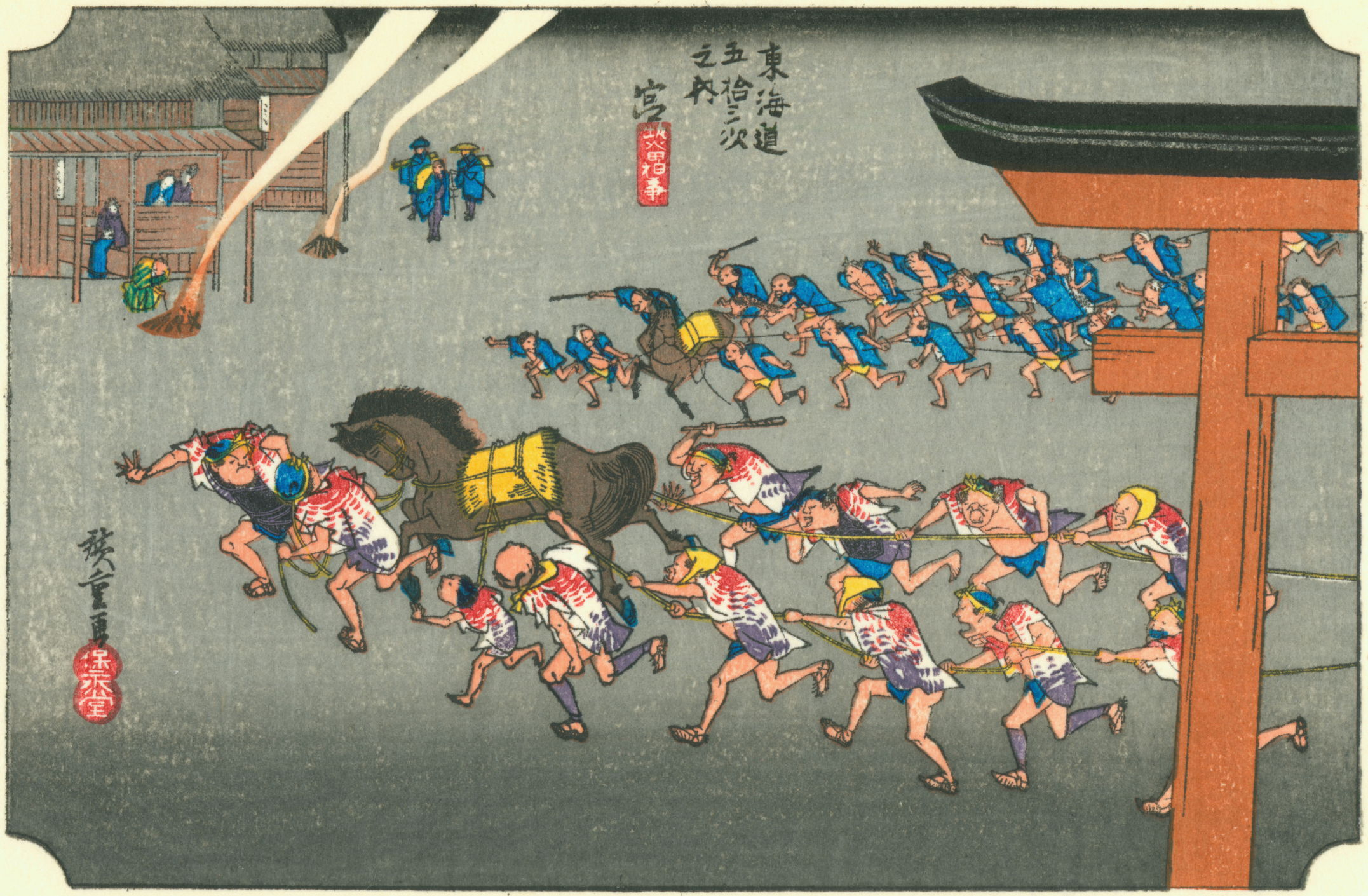
Woodblock print Miya depicting the horse festival Uma no Tō at the shrine, by Hiroshige (1833).

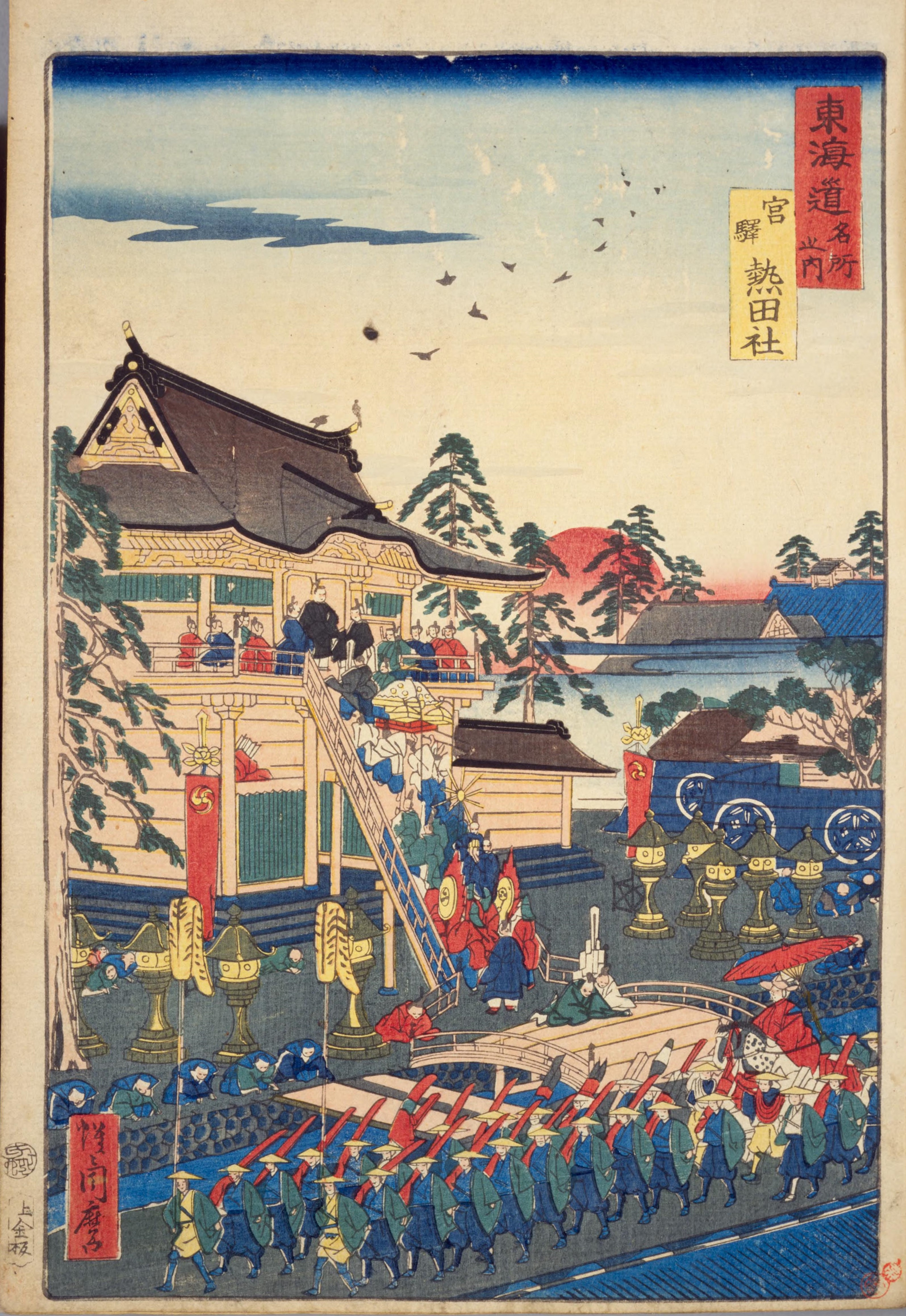
Woodblock print of Shinyo to Gyoshinji procession with the Kusanagi holy sword, at the western gate Chinkō-mon (from Tōkaidō Meisho no Uchi (Famous Sites along the Tokaido) by Kawanabe Kyōsai, 1863)

Over 70 ceremonies and festivals are held annually at the shrine.

- Hatsu-Ebisu (January 5): Seeking good fortune in the new year from Ebisu, the kami of Fortune.
- Yodameshi Shinji (January 7): The projected annual rainfall for the coming year is prophesied by measuring the amount of water in a pot kept underneath the floor of the Eastern Treasure House.
- Touka Shinji (January 11): A variation on an annual ceremony (Touka-no-sechie) of the Imperial Court in the Heian period (10th-12th Century), the shrine dance becomes a prayer in movement hoping for bumper crops of the year.
- Hosha Shinji (January 15): Ceremonial which involves shooting an arrow at a wooden piece called chigi fixed at the center of a huge mark.
- Bugaku Shinji (May 1): A ceremonial dance from the Heian era is performed outdoors on a red painted stage.
- Eyoudo Shinji (May 4): A festival to commemorate the return of the sacred sword in the reign of Emperor Tenji.
- Shinyo to Gyoshinji 神輿渡御神事 (lit. "Mikoshi passing ritual") (May 5): A festival in which portable shrine (mikoshi) is carried in a formal procession to the western gate Chinkō-mon, where ceremonies and prayers for the security of the Imperial Palace are performed in the open air. In the Meiji and Taishō era, this procession moved in sober and solemn silence. The ceremony at the gate was brief, lasting only 20 minutes; and then the mikoshi and its attendants returned into the Shrine precincts. Shōgun Ashikaga Yoshimasa provided a new mikoshi and a complete set of robes and other accouterments for this festival on the occasion of repairs to the shrine in the 1457-1459 (Chōroku 1-3).
- Rei Sai (June 5): Portable tabernacles (mikoshi) in various styles are carried along the approaches to the shrine; and at night, groups of 365 lanterns (makiwara) appear lit at the gates. This festival commemorates an Imperial proclamation (semmyō) issued in 1872 (Meiji 5). After 1906 (Meiji 39), exhibitions of judo, fencing (gekken), and archery (kyūdō) are presented for the gratification of the kami.

== Auxiliary shrines ==
The Atsuta Shrine has 1 betsugū, 8 sessha, and 19 massha inside the hongū, and 4 sessha and 12 massha outside hongū, 45 shrines in total (including the hongū).

=== Betsugū ===
- Hakkengū

=== Sessha ===
- Ichinomisaki Shrine
- Hisakimiko Shrine
- Hikowakamiko Shrine
- Minamishingūsha
- Mita Shrine
- Shimochikama Shrine
- Kamichikama Shrine
- Ryū Shrine

=== Sessha outside hongū ===
- Takakuramusubimiko Shrine
- Hikamianego Shrine
- Aofusuma Shrine
- Matsugo Shrine

=== Massha ===
- Yako-no-Yashira
- Tōsu-no-Yashira
- Reinomimae-sha
- others

== Gallery ==
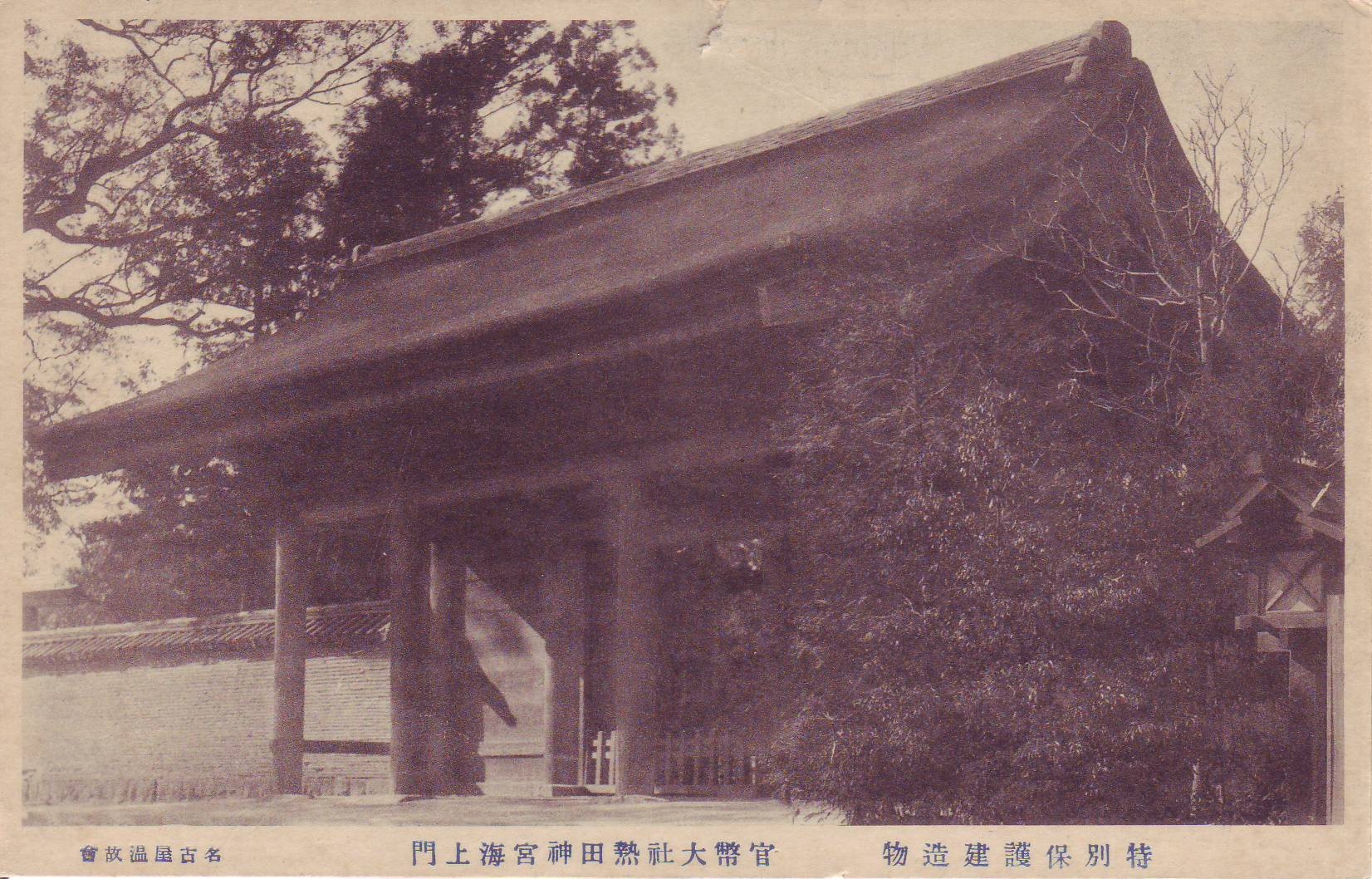
Postcard of the Kaijō-mon (海上門 lit. "Sea Gate") with the earthen Nobunaga-bei wall that remains. The gate was a National Treasure and was lost in the Pacific War. It can be seen through augmented reality.

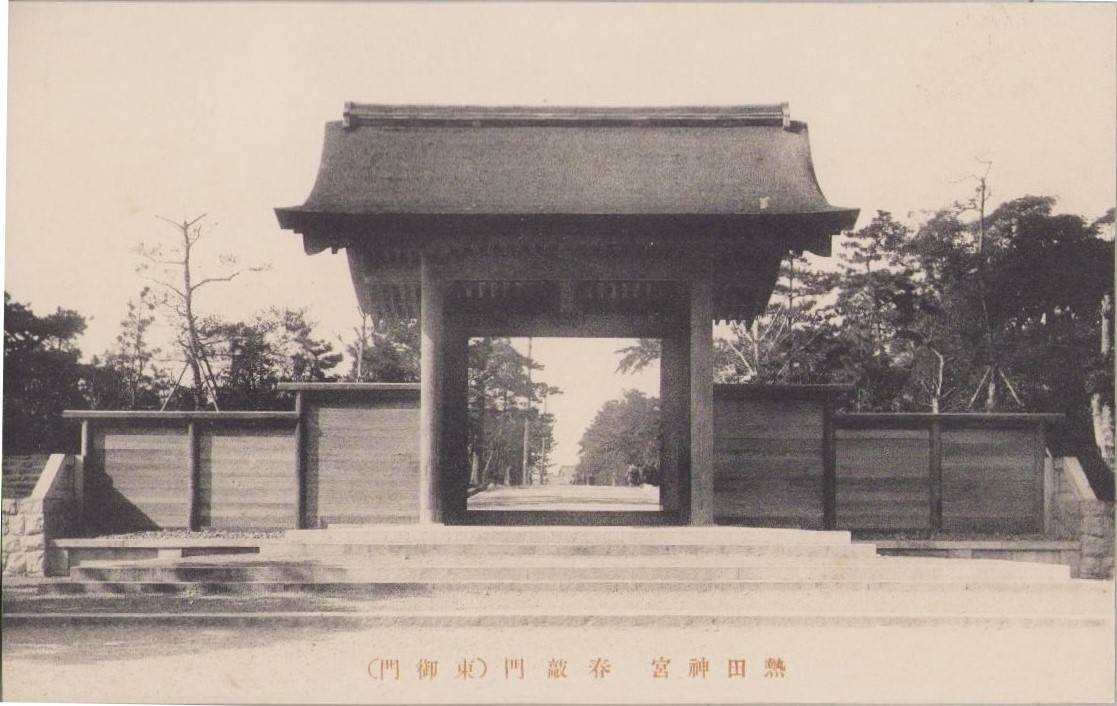
Postcard of the east gate Shunkō-mon (春敲門) dedicated to Yang Guifei. The gate was a National Treasure and was lost in the Pacific War.

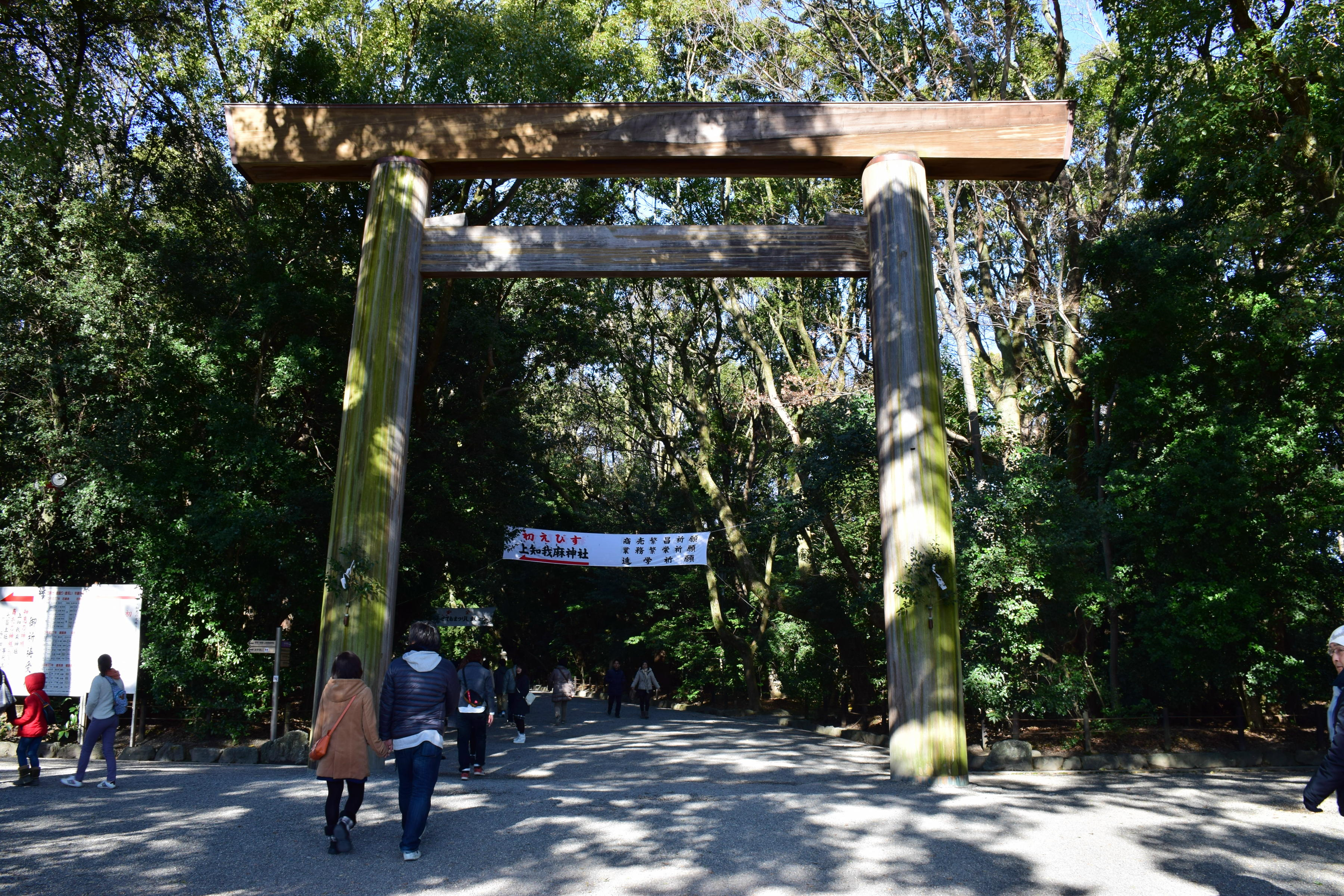
Main torii

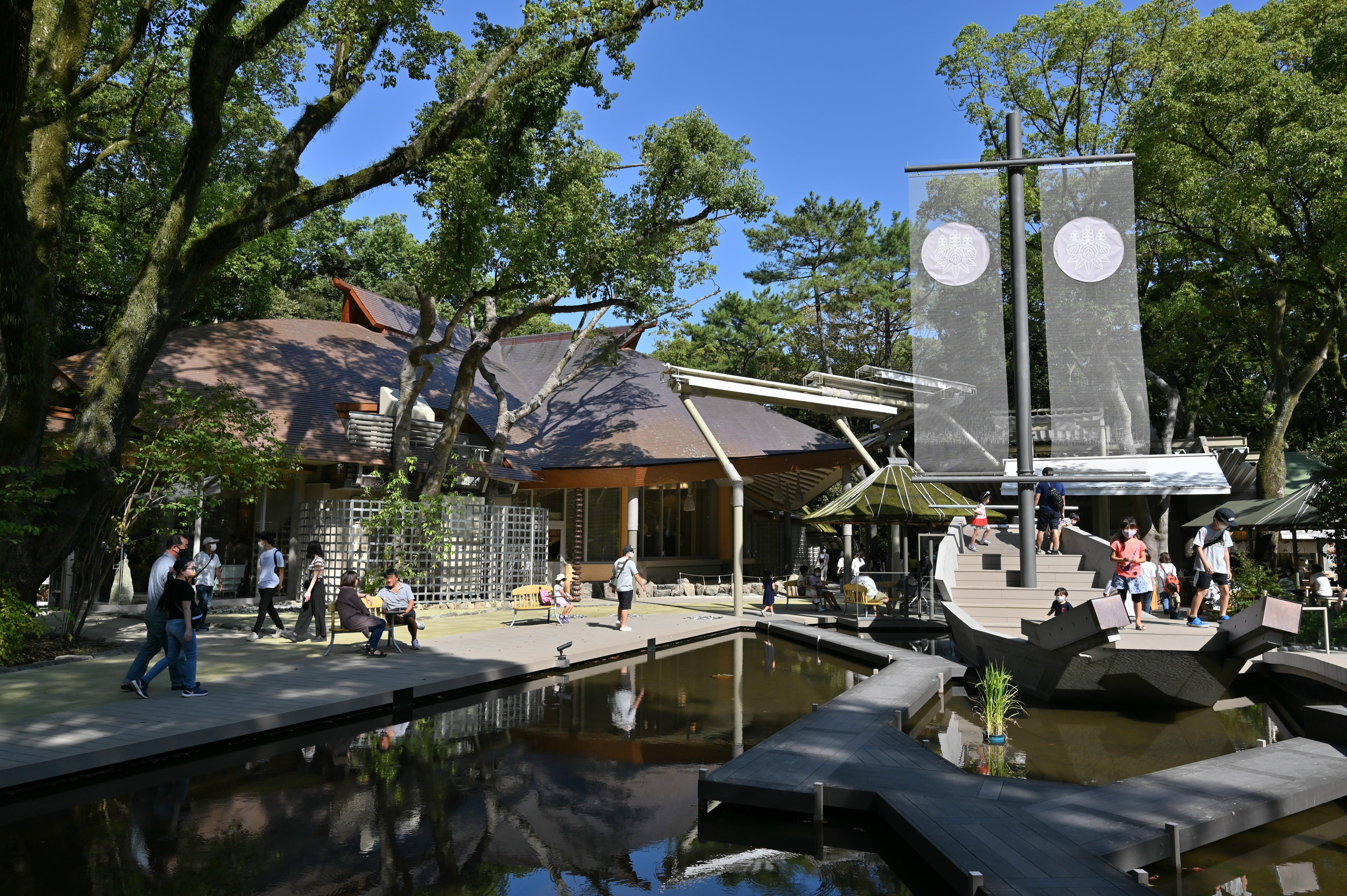
Kusanagi Square

== Access ==
The subway stations Atsuta Jingu Temma-cho Station and Atsuta Jingu Nishi Station serve the area. Atsuta Station is a JR station. Jingū-mae Station is a Meitetsu station.

== See also ==
- List of Shinto shrines
- List of Jingū
- Yaizu Shrine
- List of National Treasures of Japan (crafts-swords)
