= Atsuta Jingu Nishi Station =

Metro station in Nagoya, Japan

Coordinates: 35.1279°N 136.9067°E

M27 Atsuta Jingu Nishi Station 熱田神宮西駅
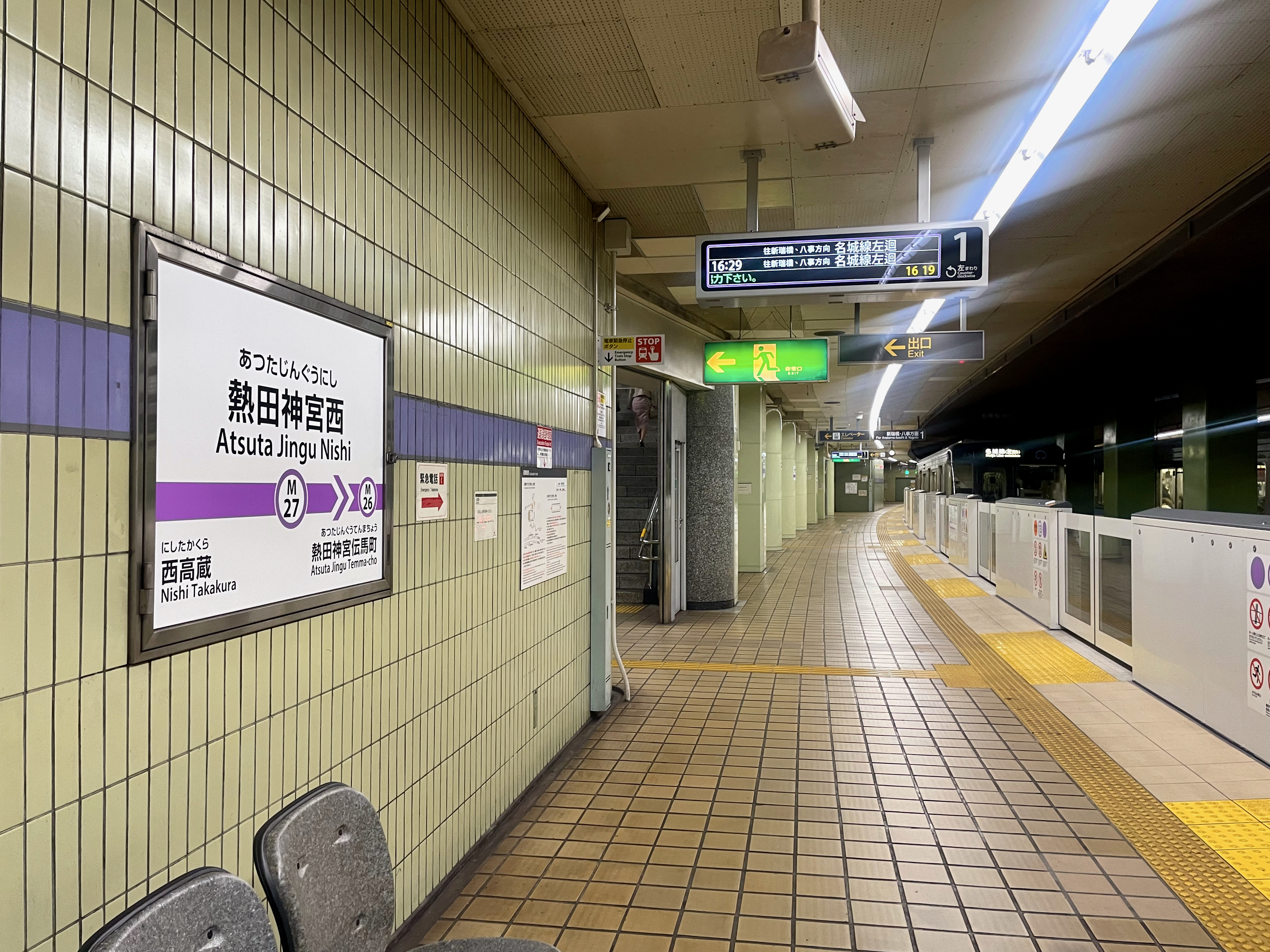

General information
- Location: Jingū 1-1-4, Atsuta, Nagoya, Aichi （名古屋市熱田区神宮一丁目1-4） Japan
- System: Nagoya Municipal Subway station
- Operator: Transportation Bureau City of Nagoya
- Line: Meijō Line
- Connections: Bus terminal

Other information
- Station code: M27

History
- Opened: 30 March 1974; 52 years ago

Passengers
- 2009: 3,697 daily

Services
Preceding station	Nagoya Municipal Subway	Following station
Atsuta Jingu Temma-cho M26 anticlockwise	Meijō Line	Nishi Takakura M28 clockwise
Location

Atsuta Jingu Nishi Station (熱田神宮西駅, Atsuta-Jingū-Nishi-eki) is an underground metro station located in Atsuta-ku, Nagoya, Aichi Prefecture, Japan operated by the Nagoya Municipal Subway's Meijō Line. It is located 24.4 kilometers from the terminus of the Meijō Line at Kanayama Station. This station provides access to Atsuta Shrine.

== History ==
The station was opened on 30 March 1974. The station was originally called Jingu Nishi Station (神宮西駅, Jingū-Nishi-eki) and its name was changed on 4 January 2023.

== Lines ==
- Nagoya Municipal Subway
  - Meijō Line (Station number: M27)

== Layout ==
Atsuta Jingu Nishi Station has two underground opposed side platforms.

=== Platforms ===
1	■ Meijō Line	For Aratama-bashi and Yagoto
2	■ Meijō Line	For Kanayama and Sakae
