= Yamato Takeru =

Japanese prince of the imperial house

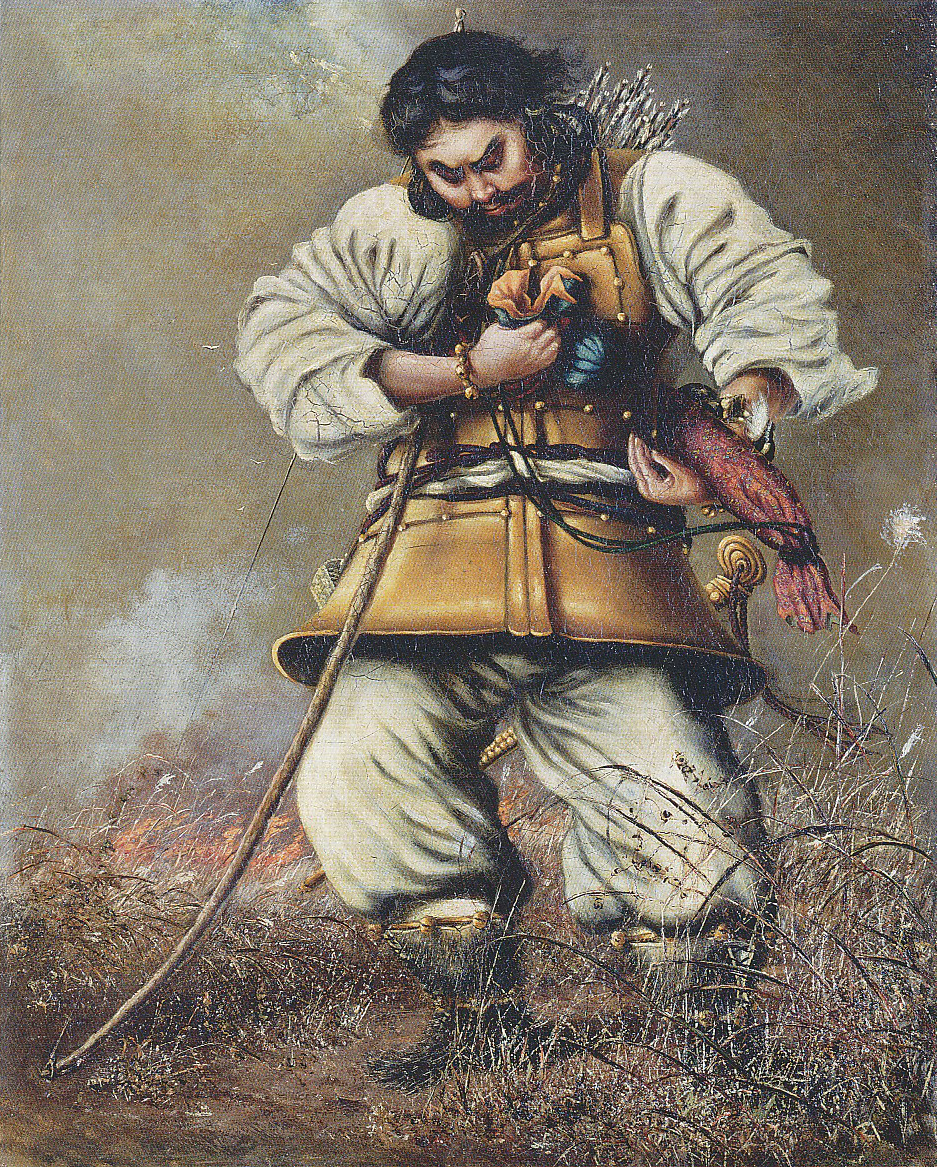
- Spouse: Miyazu-hime, Futaji Irihime, Ototachibana-hime
- Issue: Emperor Chūai
- Father: Emperor Keikō
- Mother: Harima no Inabi no Ōiratsume

Yamato Takeru (ヤマトタケルノミコト, Yamato Takeru no Mikoto), (Note: Japanese pronunciation: [jä́.mä̀.tò̞ | tä̀.ꜜké̞.ɾɯ̈́ nó̞ mí.kó̞.tó̞, jä́.mä̀.tò̞ tä̀.kè̞.ɾɯ̈̀ nò̞ mì.kò̞.tò̞, jä̀.mä́.tó̞ tä́.ké̞.ɾɯ̈́ nó̞ mí.kó̞.tó̞, jä̀.mä́.tó̞ tä́.kè̞.ɾɯ̈̀ nò̞ mì.kò̞.tò̞]) originally Prince Ousu (小碓命, Ousu no Mikoto), was a Japanese folk hero and semi-legendary prince of the imperial dynasty, son of Emperor Keikō, who is traditionally counted as the 12th Emperor of Japan. The kanji spelling of his name varies: it appears in the Nihon Shoki as 日本武尊 and in the Kojiki as 倭建命.

The story of his life and death are told principally in the Japanese chronicles in Kojiki (712) and Nihon Shoki (720), but also mentioned in Kogo Shūi (807) and some histories like the Hitachi no Kuni Fudoki (常陸国風土記) (721). One of his sons became Emperor Chūai, the 14th Emperor of Japan.

His history is uncertain but based on the chronicles his life can be calculated. He was born circa 72 and died in 114. Details are different between the two books, and the version in Kojiki is assumed to be loyal to the older form of this legend.

== Legendary narrative ==
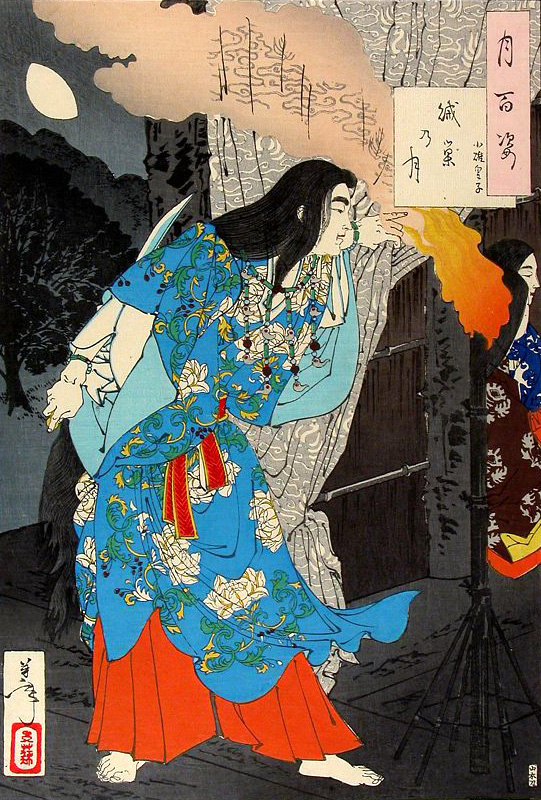
Yamato Takeru dressed as a maidservant, preparing to kill the Kumaso leaders. Woodblock print on paper. Yoshitoshi, 1886.

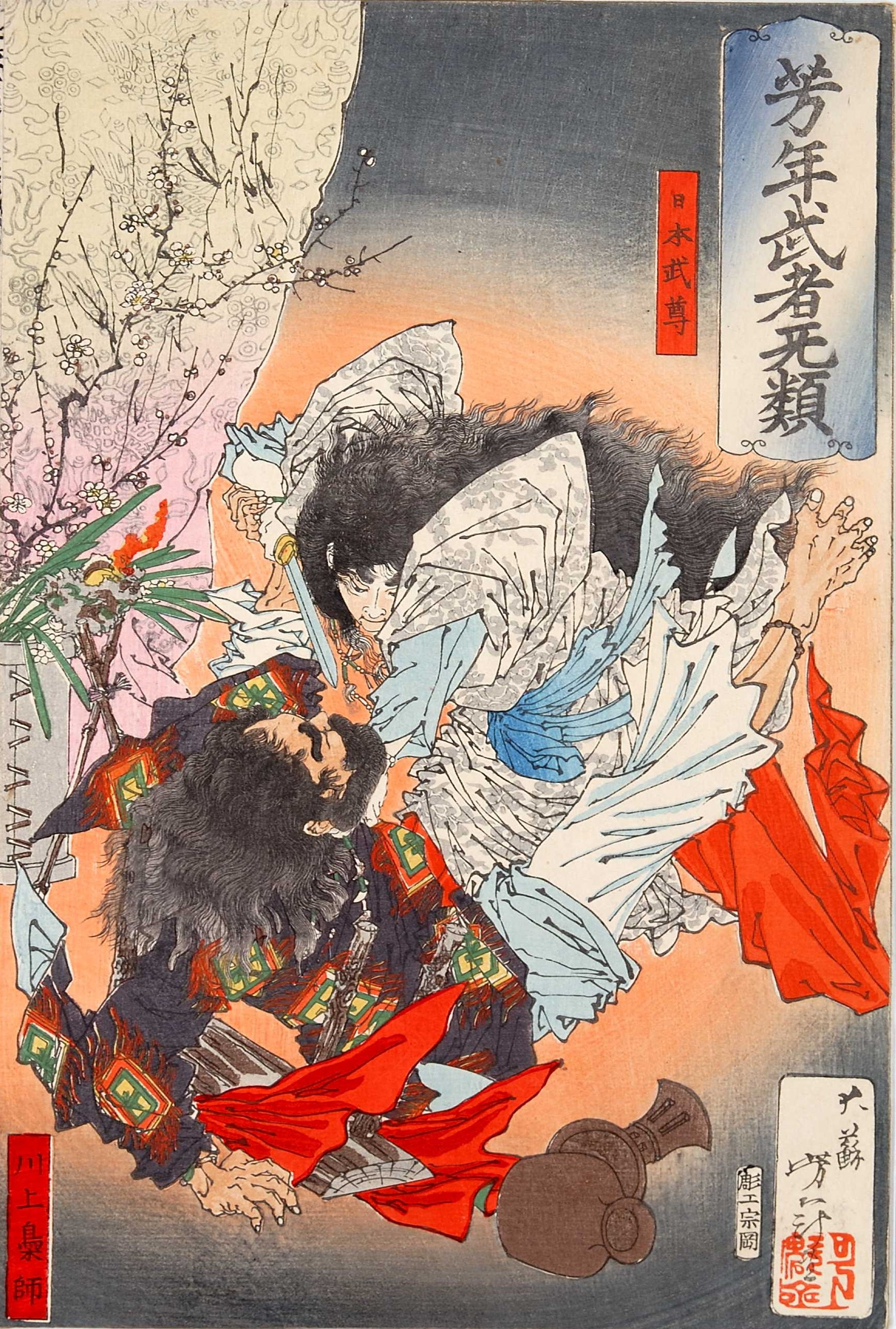
Yamato Takeru attacking the Kumaso leader.

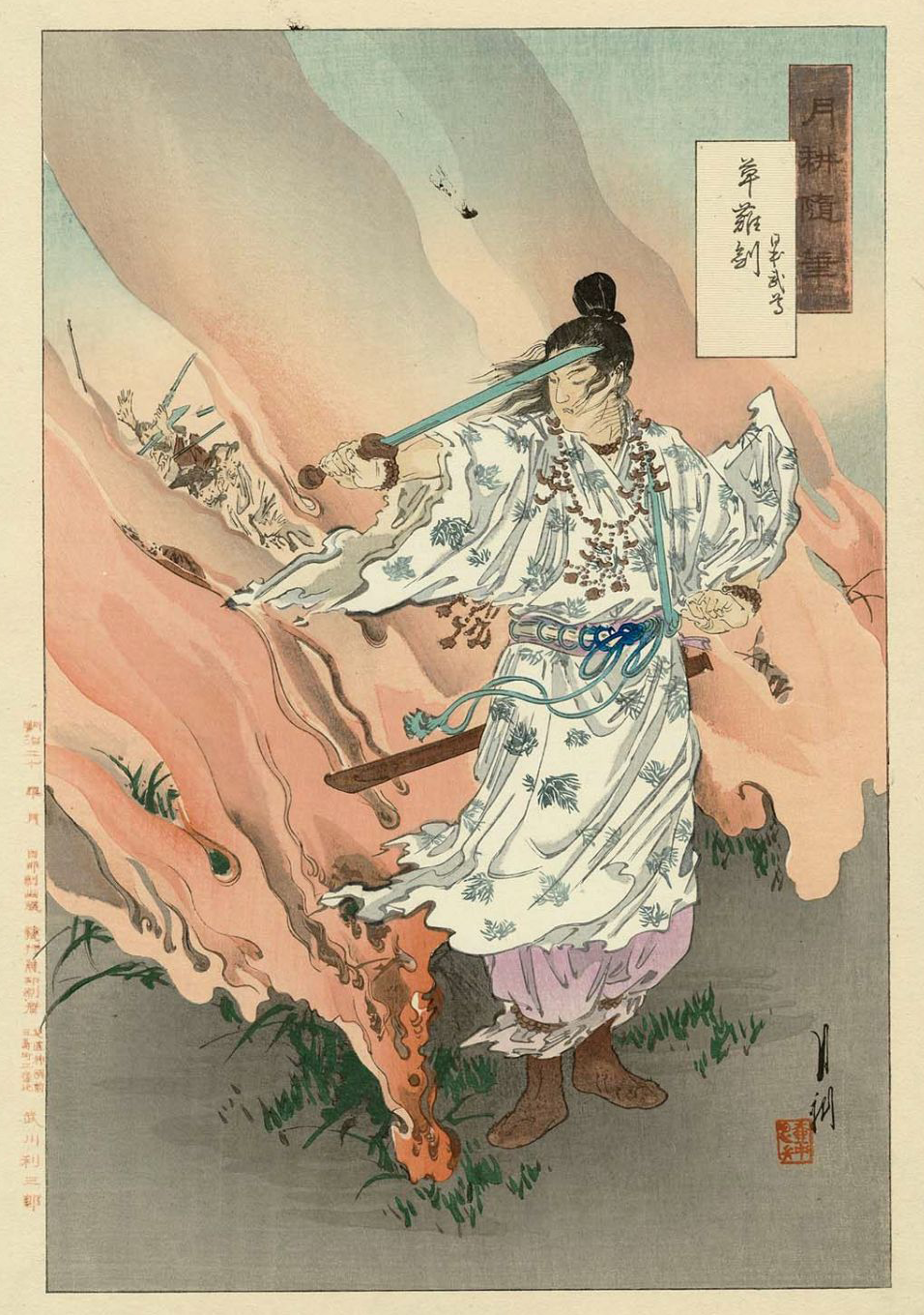
Yamato Takeru and his sword Kusanagi no Tsurugi

Prince Takeru slew his elder brother Prince Ōusu (大碓皇子, Ōusu no Miko). His father, Emperor Keikō, feared his brutal temperament. To keep him at a distance, the emperor sent his son to the land of Kumaso, today Kumamoto Prefecture, and then the Izumo Province, today the eastern part of Shimane Prefecture, to defeat rebels. However, Takeru succeeded in defeating his enemies. In the land of the Kumaso, the prince achieved victory by cross-dressing as a maid attendant at a Kumaso drinking party to get close to his targets and slay them. One of the enemies he defeated praised him and gave him the title Yamato Takeru, meaning The Brave of Yamato. In the Izumo Province, the prince used trickery by befriending his enemy and exchanging swords with him before a duel. Due to receiving a wooden sword, the enemy was slain. The prince also defeated several deities. He returned triumphant, but Emperor Keikō's mind was unchanged.

Keikō sent Yamato Takeru to the eastern land whose people disobeyed the imperial court. The prince was ordered to defeat the rebels and savage deities of that land. Yamato Takeru met his aunt Princess Yamato-hime, the highest priestess of Amaterasu at Ise Grand Shrine (in Ise Province) and grieved, "my father wishes I would die?" Princess Yamatohime-no-mikoto showed him compassion and lent him a holy sword named Ame no Murakumo no tsurugi (Kusanagi no tsurugi), which Susanoo, the brother god of Amaterasu, found in the body of the eight-headed great serpent, Yamata no Orochi.

Yamato Takeru went to the eastern land. He lost his wife Ototachibana-hime during a storm when she sacrificed herself to soothe the anger of the sea god. He defeated many enemies in the eastern land. On one incident, he was lured into a trap by a treacherous lord who tried to burn him alive in an open grassland. Desperately, Yamato Takeru used the Ame-no-Murakumo-no-Tsurugi to cut back the grass and remove fuel from the fire, but in doing so, he discovered that the sword enabled him to control the wind and cause it to move in the direction of his swing. Taking advantage of this magic, Yamato Takeru used his other gift from his aunt, fire strikers, to enlarge the fire in the direction of the lord and his men, and he used the winds controlled by the sword to sweep the blaze toward them. In triumph, Yamato Takeru renamed the sword Kusanagi-no-Tsurugi ("Grass-Cutting Sword") to commemorate his narrow escape and victory. On another incident, he encountered and killed the deity of Ashigara pass.

Legend has it that he and a local old man composed the first sedōka in Kai Province with Mount Tsukuba (now in Ibaraki Prefecture) as its theme. On his return, Yamato Takeru married Miyazu-hime and challenged a local god of Mount Ibuki, which sits on the border of Ōmi Province and Mino Province. He went to fight the god of Mt. Ibuki without his sword, but the god cursed him with disease. He fell ill and died.

The story above is found in the Kojiki. In the Nihonshoki version, the father and Yamato Takeru keep a good relation.

According to traditional sources, Yamato Takeru died in the 43rd year of Emperor Keiko's reign (景行天皇43年). The possessions of the dead prince were gathered together along with the sword Kusanagi; and his widow venerated his memory in a shrine at her home. Some time later, these relics, including the sacred sword were moved to the current location of Atsuta Shrine.

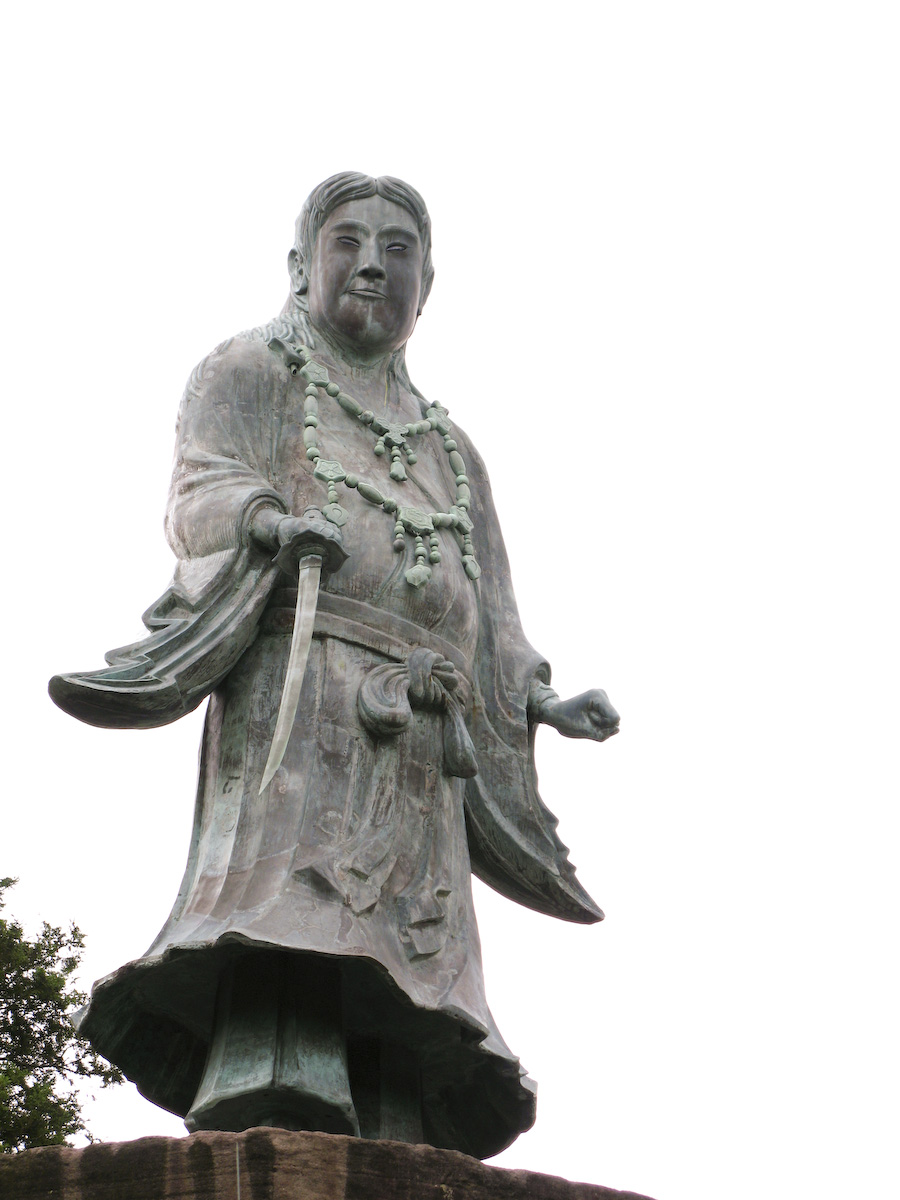
The statue of Yamato Takeru at Kenroku-en

Yamato Takeru is believed to have died somewhere in Ise Province. According to the legend, the name of Mie Prefecture was derived from his final words. After death, his soul turned into a great white bird and flew away. His tomb in Ise is known as the Mausoleum of the White Plover. A statue of Yamato Takeru stands in Kenroku-en in Kanazawa, Ishikawa.

== Worship ==
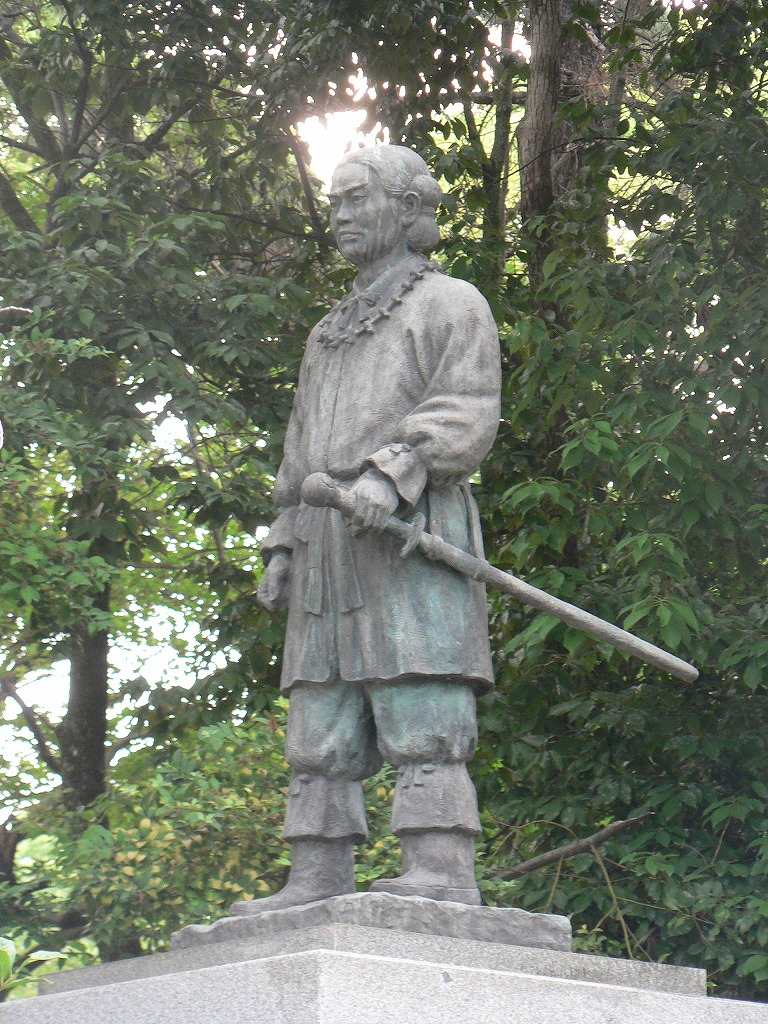
The statue of Yamato Takeru at Ōtori taisha

Owing to the legend of Yamato Takeru's death, he is worshiped as Otori-sama (The Great Bird). Otori shrines exist throughout Japan, and every November a festival is held on a day of the Rooster known as Tori no Ichi, literally "Market of the Bird". Worshipers pray for prosperity and vendors sell charms on shrine grounds known as kumade, which are miniature rakes adorned with auspicious objects like Maneki-neko or rice. Hanazono Shrine and Otori Shrine in Asakusa, Tokyo are famous for their large-scale Tori no Ichi. Larger Tori no Ichi can span multiple days and are referred to numerically as Ichi no Tori, Ni no Tori etc.

== Comparative legends ==
Anthropologist C. Scott Littleton has described the Yamato Takeru legend as "Arthurian" due to some structural similarities with the King Arthur legend. Common points include the use of two magic swords, of which the first validates the authority of the hero; the leadership role of a war band; the death to an enemy after giving up the sword to a female figure; a transportation to the after world; and others. Littleton proposed that both legends descend from a common northeast Iranian ancestor, despite evidence to the contrary, with oldest middle eastern equivalent myths springing up after the fall of Constantinople (and the subsequent Ottoman translations of texts), while the iconography and heraldry claimed by Covington to be Scythia was brought in from central europe to persian territories in 50~40 BC by troops of the Roman Republic.

== Shrines to worship ==
- Atsuta Shrine
- Kanasana Shrine
- Yaizu Shrine

== In popular culture ==
- Prince Yamato from Bikkuriman (and, by extension, Yamato from the 2023 Bikkuri-Men anime) might be based on Yamato Takeru.
- One of the feats of Yamato Takeru was recounted in the "Grasscutter" volume of Stan Sakai's graphic novel series, Usagi Yojimbo, as well as the legend of how Kusanagi-no-Tsurugi was transferred to the Atsuta Shrine.
- In the video game Age of Empires I, the mission named The Assassins in the campaign for the Yamato civilization takes inspiration from Yamato Takeru's actions, depicting a unit named "Perseus" (Takeru) eliminating the Izumo leader to seize his realm and found a new dynasty.
- The second book of Noriko Ogiwara's The Jade Trilogy, Mirror Sword and Shadow Prince, is a retelling of Yamato Takeru's legend. The novel follows Oguna, a.k.a. Prince Ousu, one of the two main protagonists.
- Yamato Takeru is seen in a dream in the epilogue to "The Golden Princess", one of the Novels of the Change. The sword itself is the major plot point.
- In the Digimon Adventure series, two of the main characters are brothers, and their names are a reference to Yamato Takeru: Yamato Ishida and Takeru Takaishi.
- In the OVA Garzey's Wing, the protagonist suspects the involvement of Yamato Takeru in various supernatural events, causing him to invoke the full name "Yamato Takeru no Mikoto" from time to time.
- Yamato Takeru is a boss within the video game Shin Megami Tensei IV, fought within the Chaos route of the game. In the Law route, he is discovered at death's doorstep, and dies soon after.
  - Yamato Takeru also appears in Persona 4 and its enhanced remake, Persona 4 Golden. There, Yamato Takeru functions as the evolved form of the initial Persona of the final teammate, Naoto Shirogane, replacing Sukuna-Hikona.
- In One Piece, a character named Yamato appears who wields a weapon called Takeru.
- In the 2023 video game Fate/Samurai Remnant, Yamato Takeru (voiced by Hibiku Yamamura) is Miyamoto Iori's Servant, belonging to the Saber Class. Here Takeru is reimagined as an androgynous youth of unknown gender (as Saber never refers to themself as male or female yet never corrects anybody when referred to as a "damsel", "a young girl" or Iori's "special friend"/girlfriend. Also, Iori and the game's codex never uses any pronouns when referring to Saber whose gender never changes from "?" even after their identity is revealed. However, the folkroric Takeru is still referred to as a man). Takeru also has what is known by Type-Moon and the fanbase as a "Saberface" which a face similar to Artoria Pendragon (Saber) of Fate/Stay Night.
- A Yu-Gi-Oh! Trading Card Game card, Mitsurugi no Miko, Wousu, was inspired by Prince Ousu.

== See also ==
- Yamato Takeru (film)
- Yamato Takeru (TV series)
- Wartime cross-dressers
