= Tenji (era) =

Period of Japanese history (1124–1126 CE)

Tenji (天治) was a Japanese era name (年号, nengō; lit. "year name") after Hōan and before Daiji. This period spanned the years from April 1124 through January 1126. The reigning emperor was Sutoku-tennō (崇徳天皇).

== Change of era ==
- January 19, 1124 Tenji gannen (天治元年): The new era name was created to mark an event or series of events. The previous era ended and the new one commenced in Hōan 5, on the 3rd day of the 4th month of 1126.

== Events of the Tenji era ==
- 1124 (Tenji 1, 2nd month): Former-Emperor Horikawa and former-Emperor Toba went in carriages to outside the city where they could together enjoy contemplating the flowers. Taiken-mon In (formerly Fujiwara no Shōshi), who was Toba's empress and Sutoku's mother, joined the procession along with many other women of the court. Their cortege was brilliant and colorful. A great many men of the court in hunting clothes followed the ladies in this parade. Fujiwara Tadamichi then followed in a carriage, accompanied by bands of musicians and women who were to sing for the emperors.
- 1124 (Tenji 1, 10th month): Horikawa visited Mount Kōya.
- 1125 (Tenji 2, 10th month): The emperor visited Iwashimizu Shrine and the Kamo Shrines; and afterward, he also visited the shrines Hirano, Ōharano, Mutsunoo, Kitano, Gion and several others.

== Notes ==
Preceded by Hōan	Era or nengō Tenji; 1124–1126	Succeeded by Daiji
