= Tenji =

The word Tenji can refer to several things in Japanese, including:

- Tenji (点字) is a system of Japanese Braille.
- Emperor Tenji (天智天皇 Tenji Tennō) is the name of an emperor of Japan.
- Tenji (天治) was a Japanese era after Hōan and before Daiji, lasting from 1124 to 1126. The reigning Emperor was Emperor Sutoku.

Preceded by Hōan	Era or nengō Tenji; 1124–1126	Succeeded by Daiji
