= Yoshida Shrine =

Shinto shrine in Kyoto, Japan

Yoshida Shrine 吉田神社
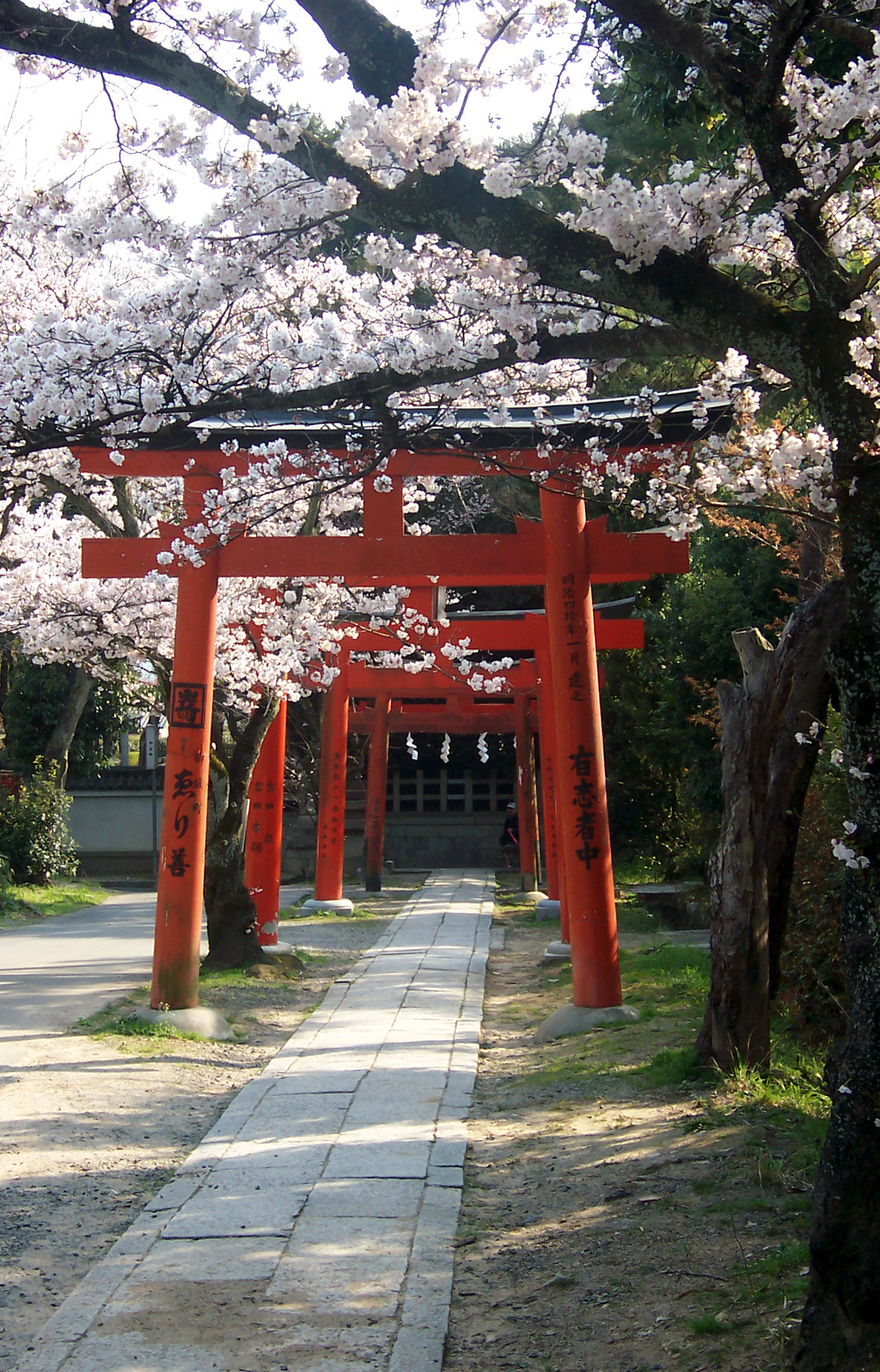
- Yoshida torii at cherry blossom time.

- Location within Japan

Religion
- Affiliation: Shinto
- Deity: Takemikazuchi Futsunushi Ame-no-Koyane Himegami

Location
- Location: 8 Yoshidakaguraokacho, Sakyō, Kyoto 〒 606-8311
- Interactive map of Yoshida Shrine 吉田神社
- Coordinates: 35°01′31″N 135°47′05″E

Architecture
- Style: Kasuga-zukuri
- Established: 859

Yoshida Shrine (吉田神社, Yoshida jinja) is a Shinto shrine located in Sakyō-ku in Kyoto, Japan. It was founded in 859 by the Fujiwara clan.

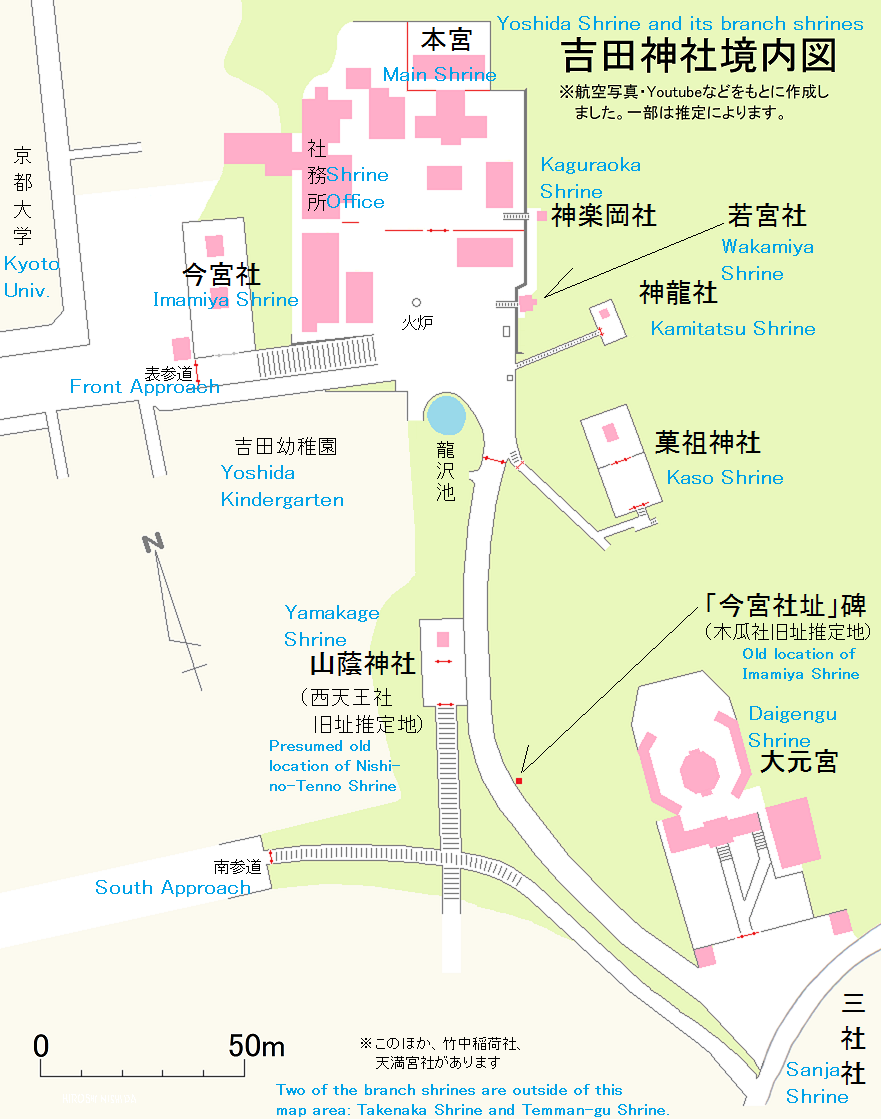
Yoshida Shrine and its branch shrines

== History ==
The shrine became the object of Imperial patronage during the early Heian period. In 965, Emperor Murakami ordered that Imperial messengers were sent to report important events to the guardian kami of Japan. These heihaku were initially presented to 16 shrines; and in 991, Emperor Ichijō added three more shrines to Murakami's list — including Yoshida.

From 1871 through 1946, the Yoshida Shrine was officially designated one of the Kanpei-chūsha (官幣中社), meaning that it stood in the second rank of government supported shrines. Yoshida Kanetomo, founder of Yoshida Shinto, is buried here.

== See also ==
- List of Shinto shrines
- Twenty-Two Shrines
- Modern system of ranked Shinto Shrines
