= 1132 =

1132 in various calendars
- Gregorian calendar: 1132; MCXXXII
- Ab urbe condita: 1885
- Armenian calendar: 581; ԹՎ ՇՁԱ
- Assyrian calendar: 5882
- Balinese saka calendar: 1053–1054
- Bengali calendar: 538–539
- Berber calendar: 2082
- English Regnal year: 32 Hen. 1 – 33 Hen. 1
- Buddhist calendar: 1676
- Burmese calendar: 494
- Byzantine calendar: 6640–6641
- Chinese calendar: 辛亥年 (Metal Pig); 3829 or 3622 — to — 壬子年 (Water Rat); 3830 or 3623
- Coptic calendar: 848–849
- Discordian calendar: 2298
- Ethiopian calendar: 1124–1125
- Hebrew calendar: 4892–4893
- Hindu calendars
- Vikram Samvat: 1188–1189
- Shaka Samvat: 1053–1054
- Kali Yuga: 4232–4233
- Holocene calendar: 11132
- Igbo calendar: 132–133
- Iranian calendar: 510–511
- Islamic calendar: 526–527
- Japanese calendar: Tenshō 2 / Chōshō 1 (長承元年)
- Javanese calendar: 1038–1039
- Julian calendar: 1132; MCXXXII
- Korean calendar: 3465
- Minguo calendar: 780 before ROC 民前780年
- Nanakshahi calendar: −336
- Seleucid era: 1443/1444 AG
- Thai solar calendar: 1674–1675
- Tibetan calendar: ལྕགས་མོ་ཕག་ལོ་ (female Iron-Boar); 1258 or 877 or 105 — to — ཆུ་ཕོ་བྱི་བ་ལོ་ (male Water-Rat); 1259 or 878 or 106

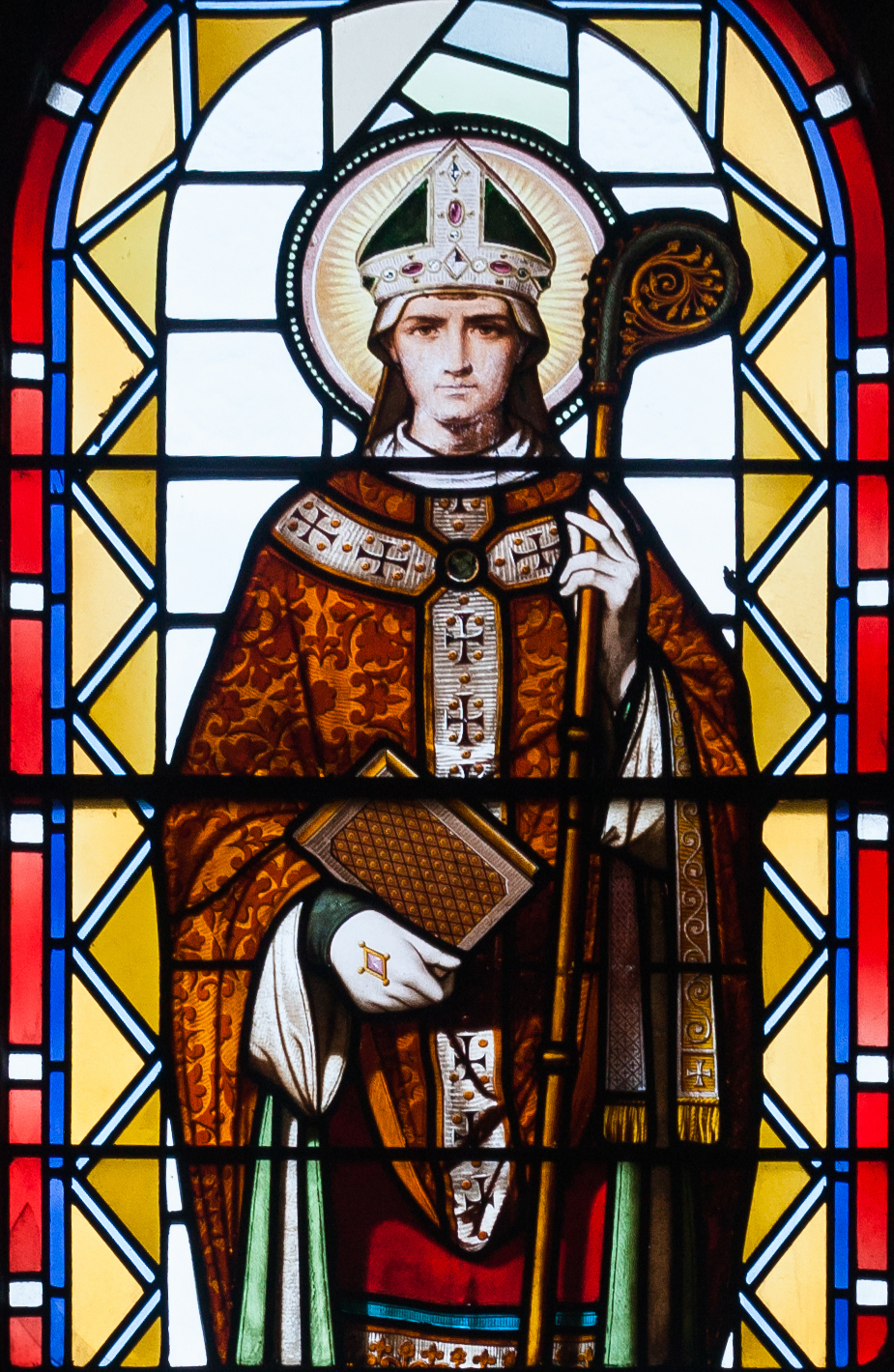
Archbishop Malachy (1094–1148)

Year 1132 (MCXXXII) was a leap year starting on Friday of the Julian calendar.

== Events ==
=== By place ===
==== Levant ====
- Summer – Imad al-Din Zengi, Seljuk governor (atabeg) of Aleppo and Mosul, marches on Baghdad (the capital of the Abbasid Caliphate), to add it to his dominions. He is defeated by the forces of Caliph Al-Mustarshid, near Tikrit (modern Iraq). Zengi flees and escapes, with the help of Tikrit's governor Najm ad-Din Ayyub (the father of Saladin), who conveys him across the River Tigris.

==== Europe ====
- July 24 – Battle of Nocera: Rebel Normans under Count Ranulf II defeat the Sicilian forces, led by King Roger II. Seven hundred knights are captured, and Roger is forced to retreat to Salerno.

==== England ====
- Barnwell Castle is erected in Northamptonshire.

==== Asia ====
- June – A fire breaks out in the Chinese capital of Hangzhou, destroying 13,000 houses and forcing many to flee to the nearby hills. Due to large fires as this, the government installs an effective fire fighting force for the city. Items such as bamboo, planks, and rush-matting are temporarily exempted from taxation, 120 tons of rice are distributed among the poor. The government suspends the housing rent requirement of the city's residents.
- The Southern Song court establishes the first permanent standing navy, with the headquarters of the Chinese admiralty based at Dinghai.

=== By topic ===
==== Religion ====
- Diarmait Mac Murchada has the abbey of Kildare in Ireland burned, and the abbess raped. He becomes king of the province of Leinster.
- Malachy is appointed archbishop of Armagh in Ireland, to impose the Roman liturgy on the independent Irish Church.
- March 5 – Rievaulx Abbey is founded by the Cistercian order, near Helmsley in Yorkshire.
- December 27 – Fountains Abbey soon to join the Cistercian order, is founded near Ripon in Yorkshire.
- Basingwerk Abbey originally Benedictine, and later Cistercian, is founded near Holywell in Wales.

== Births ==
- February 2 – William of Norwich, English martyr (d. 1144)
- April 21 – Sancho VI (the Wise), king of Navarre (d. 1194)
- Andronikos Kontostephanos, Byzantine aristocrat (or 1133)
- Ephraim of Bonn, German Jewish rabbi and writer (d. 1196)
- Maurice II de Craon, Norman nobleman and knight (d. 1196)
- Philip of France, French prince and archdeacon (d. 1160)
- Rhys ap Gruffydd, Welsh prince of Deheubarth (d. 1197)
- Vladimir III Mstislavich, Kievan Grand Prince (d. 1171)

== Deaths ==
- February 9 – Maredudd ap Bleddyn, king of Powys (b. 1047)
- March 26 – Geoffrey of Vendôme, French abbot (b. 1070)
- April 1 – Hugh of Châteauneuf, bishop of Grenoble (b. 1053)
- April 14 – Mstislav I (the Great), Kievan Grand Prince (b. 1076)
- June 6 – Taj al-Muluk Buri, Seljuk governor and regent
- October 26 – Floris the Black, Dutch count of Holland
- Conrad von Plötzkau, margrave of the Northern March
- Hugh III of Le Puiset, French nobleman and crusader
- William of Zardana (or Saône), French nobleman (or 1133)
