= Hiraoka Shrine =

Shinto shrine in Higashiōsaka, Osaka, Japan

Hiraoka Shrine 枚岡神社
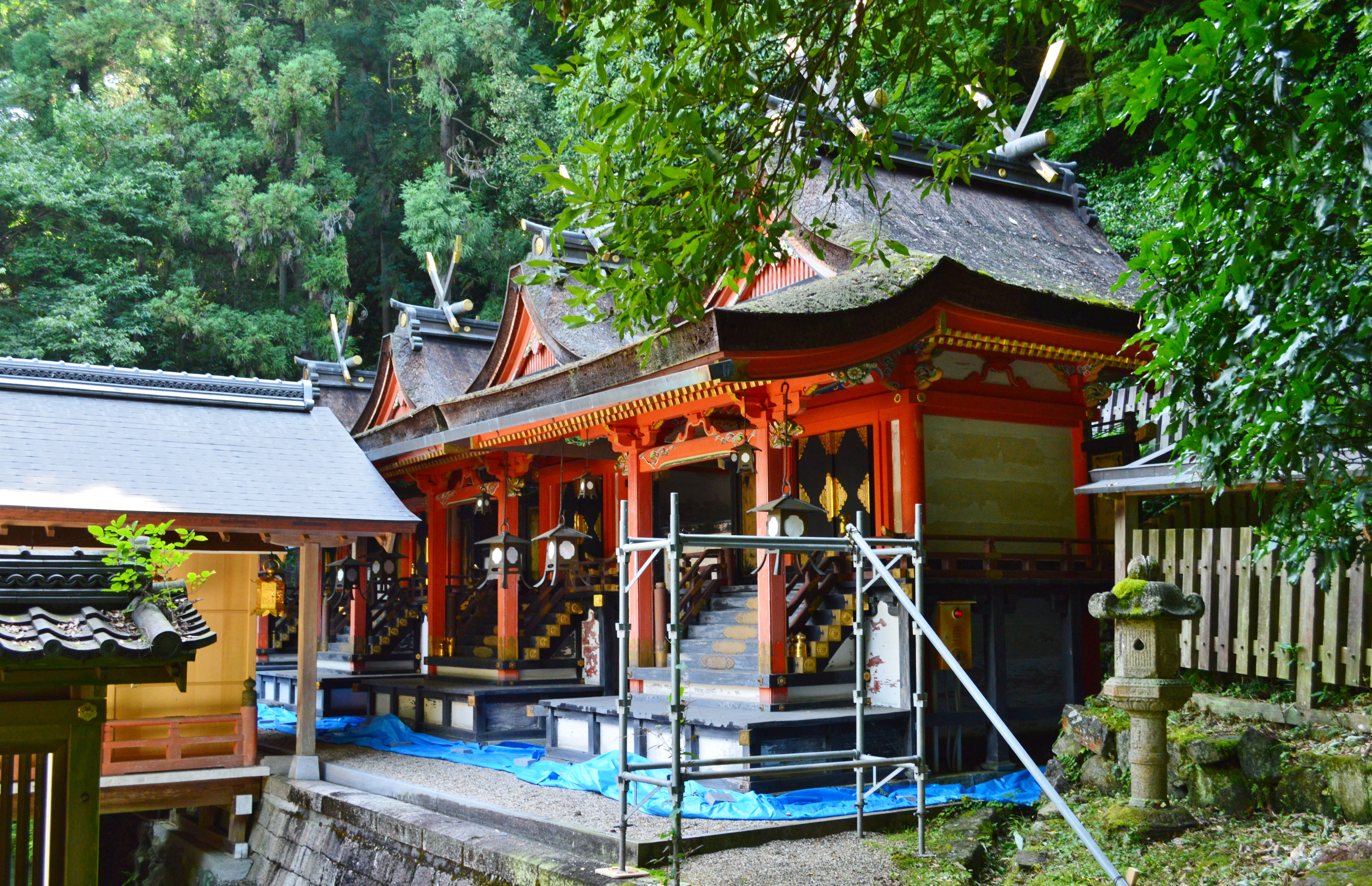
- Hiraoka Shrine Honden

- Hiraoka Shrine Hiraoka Shrine (Japan)

Religion
- Affiliation: Shinto
- Deity: Ame-no-Koyane, Hime-gami, Futsunushi, Takemikazuchi
- Festival: 1 February

Location
- Location: 7-16 Izumoi-cho, Higashiōsaka-shi, Osaka-fu 579-8033
- Interactive map of Hiraoka Shrine 枚岡神社
- Coordinates: 34°40′11.83″N 135°39′2.48″E

Architecture
- Style: Kasuga-zukuri

Website
- Official website

Hiraoka Shrine (枚岡神社, Hiraoka-jinja) is a Shinto shrine located in the city of Higashiōsaka, Osaka Prefecture, Japan. It is the Ichinomiya of former Kawachi Province. The shrine's main festival is held annually on 1 February.

== Enshrined kami ==
The kami enshrined at Hiraoka Jinja are:

- Ame-no-Koyane (天児屋根命), ancestor of the Fujiwara clan
- Hime-gami (比売御神), Ame-no-Koyane's wife
- Futsunushi (経津主命), one of the tutelary deities of the Fujiwara clan, the main kami of Katori Jingū
- Takemikazuchi (武甕槌命), one of the tutelary deities of the Fujiwara clan, the main kami of Kashima Shrine

== History ==
Hiraoka Shrine is located in the western foothills of the Ikoma Mountains in central Osaka Prefecture. In its earliest days, it was a center for mountain worship and the kami of Kozudake, the peak immediately behind the shrine, came to be identified with Ame-no-Koyane, the tutelary deity of the Nakatomi clan, the ancestors of the Fujiwara clan. There is no documentary evidence of when the shrine was first constructed, but it is believed to be sometime during the Kofun period. When the Fujiwara built Kasuga Taisha in Nara, two of the four kami enshrined (Ame-no-Koyomi and Himegami) were bunrei transferred from this shrine, and the Hiraoka Shrine was thus given the name of Moto-Kasuga ("former Kasuga"). During the Heian period, Hiraoka Shrine was designated a shrine of the first rank and its name appears repeatedly in the Shoku Nihon Kōki, Nihon Montoku Tennō Jitsuroku, Nihon Sandai Jitsuroku and the Engishiki and other official chronicles. In the Engishiki, the shrine is styled as a Myōjin-taisha (名神大社). At some time during the Heian period, the shrine came to be identified as the ichinomiya of Kawachi Province. The shrine's subsequent history is very sketchy. During the Kamakura period, it is recorded that the monk Eison from Saidai-ji led 100 priests in prayers for deliverance of Japan from the Mongol invasions in 1275. During the Sengoku period, the shrine was burned down by Oda Nobunaga in 1574. Toyotomi Hideyori sponsored a reconstruction program from 1602 to 1605. Under the Tokugawa shogunate, the shrine was accorded some small estates and privileges for its upkeep, but the general attitude of the shogunate was one of neglect. The current main shrine buildings were rebuilt in 1826 through the efforts of local parishioners. After the Meiji restoration, the shrine was given the rank of Imperial shrine, 1st rank (官幣大社, Kanpei taisha) in the Modern system of ranked Shinto shrines.

== Cultural properties ==
Like Kasuga Taisha, the main shrine consists of four Kasuga-zukuri sanctuaries in a single structure and is designated as a Tangible Cultural Property of Higashiōsaka.

== Gallery ==
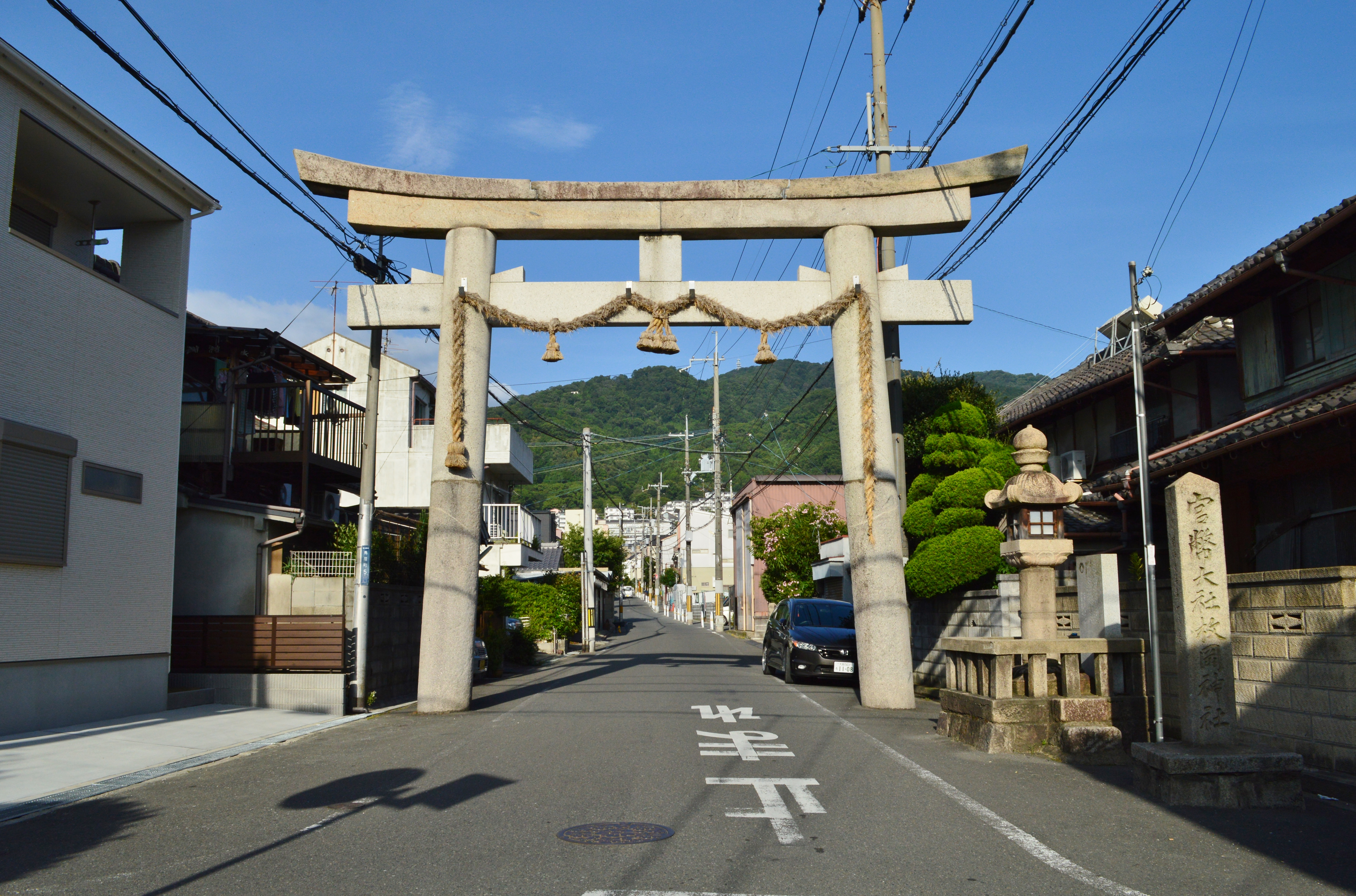
Main Torii

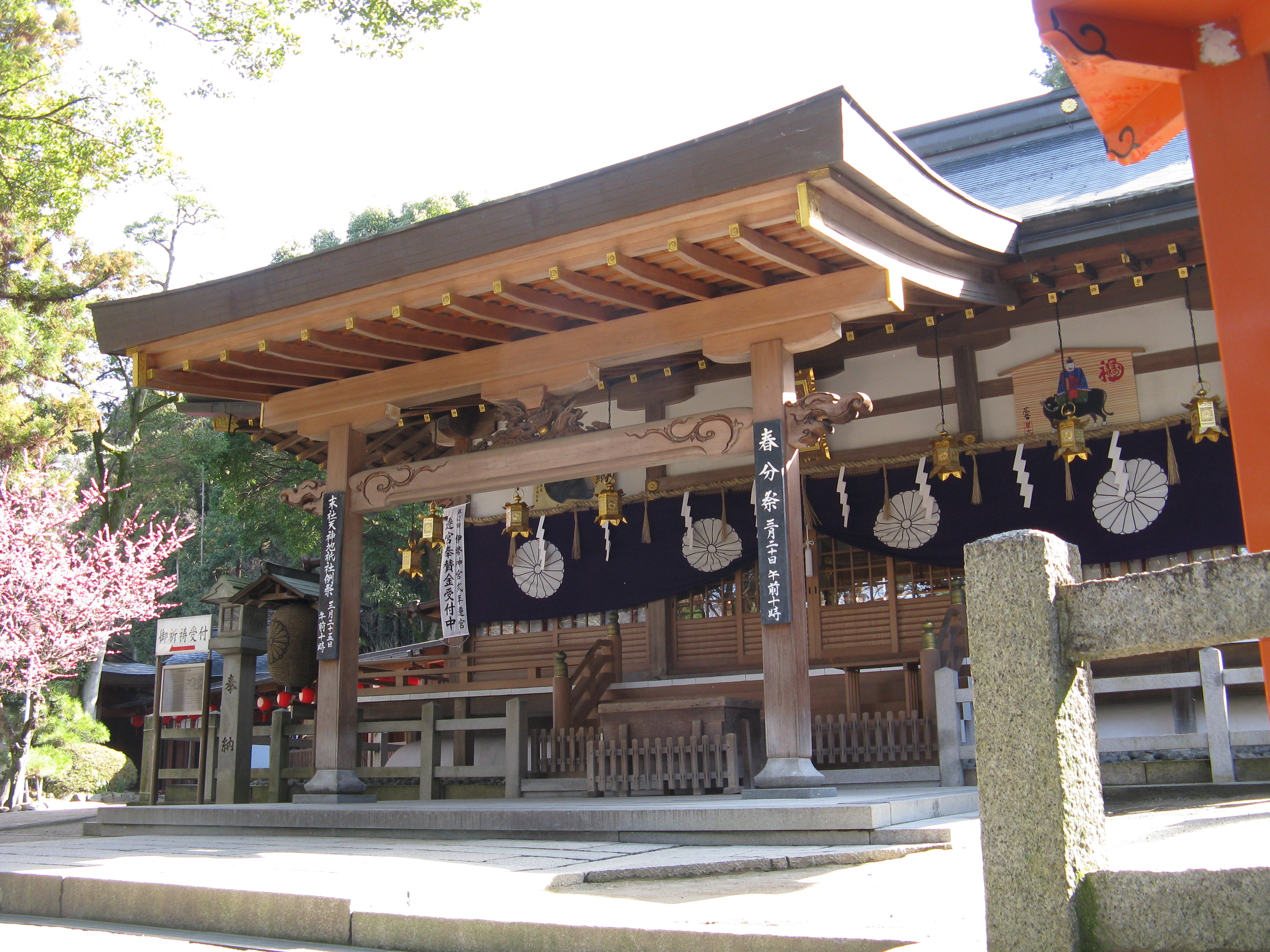
Haiden

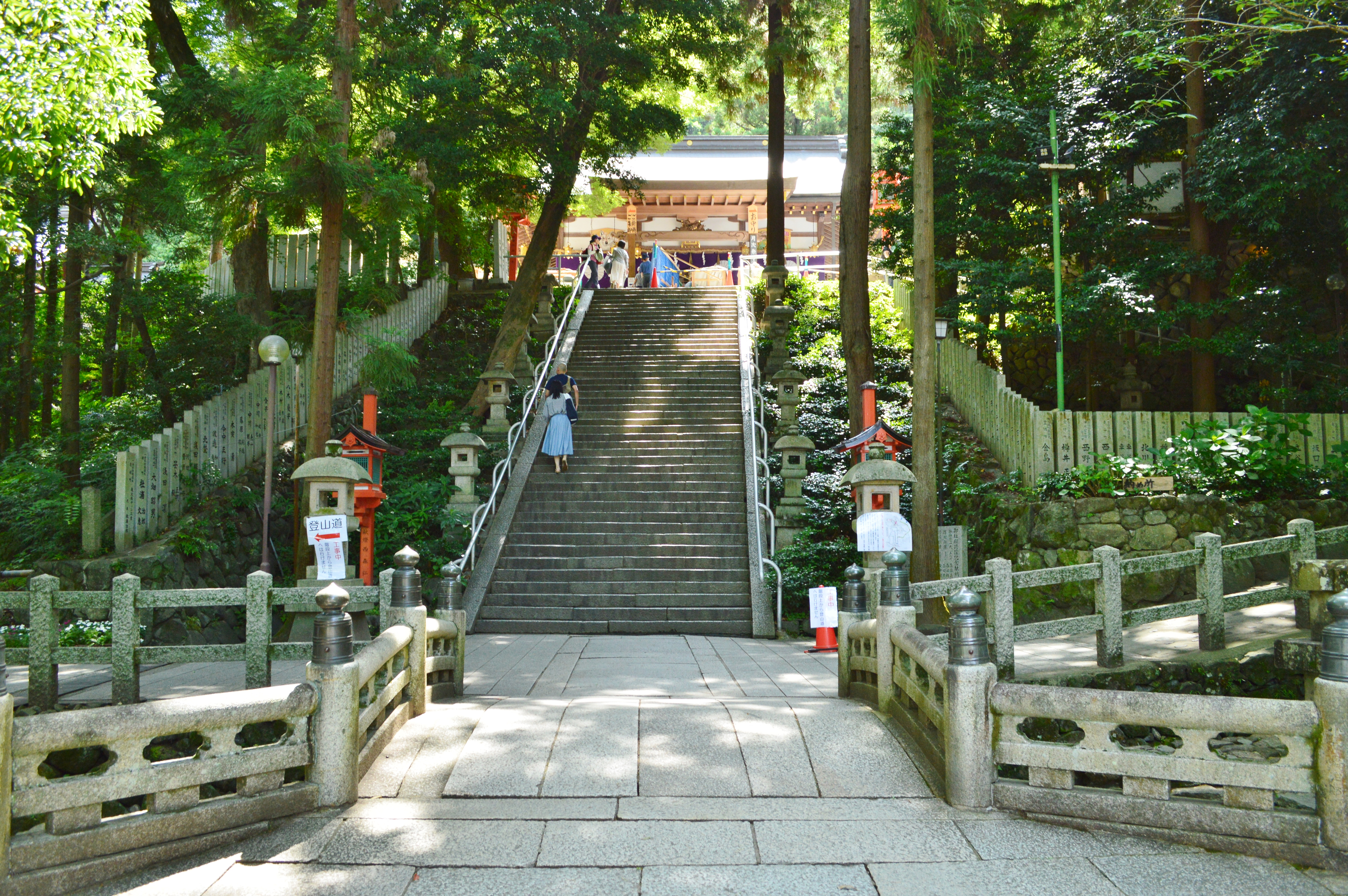
Approach

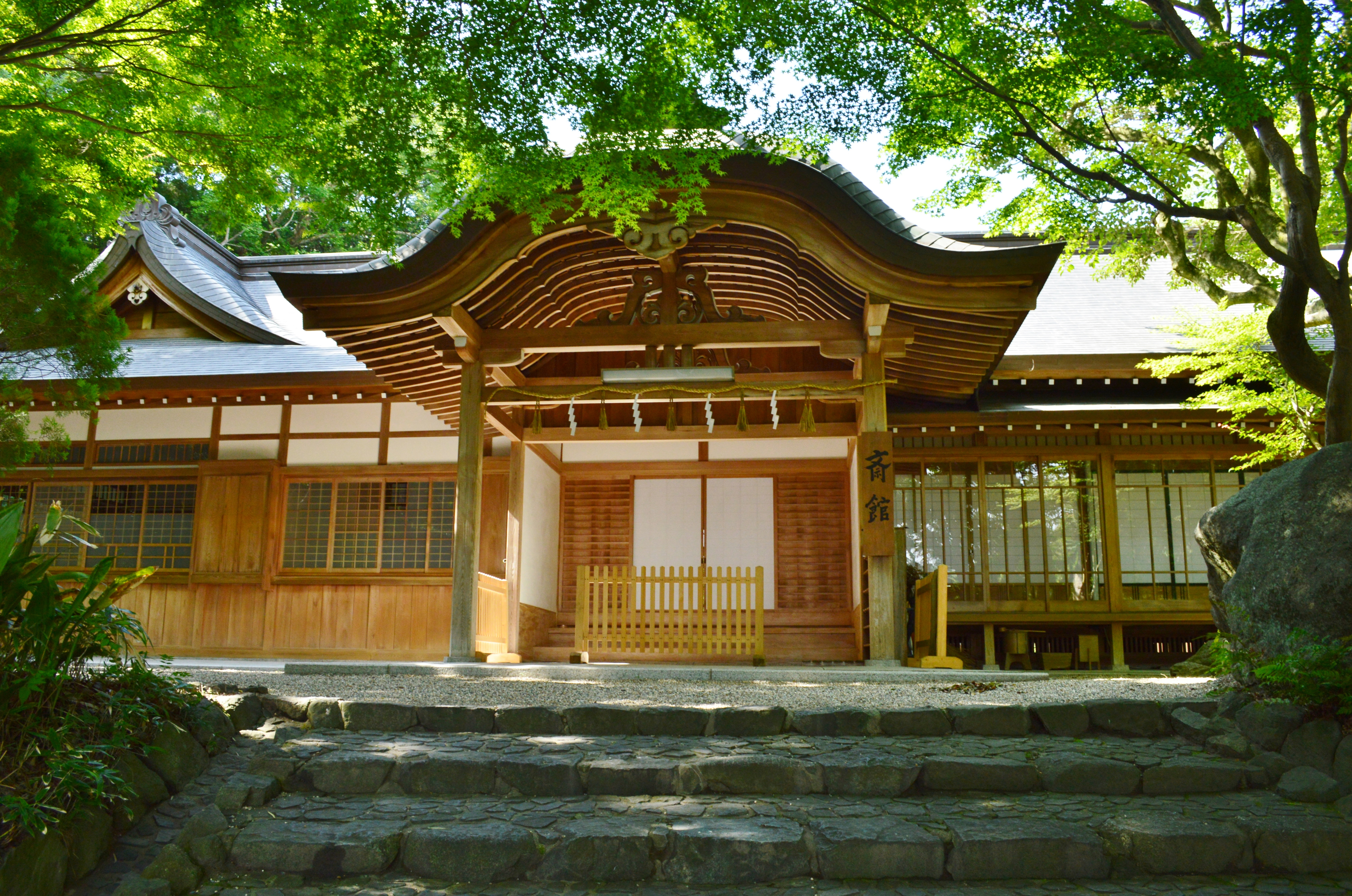
former shrine offices

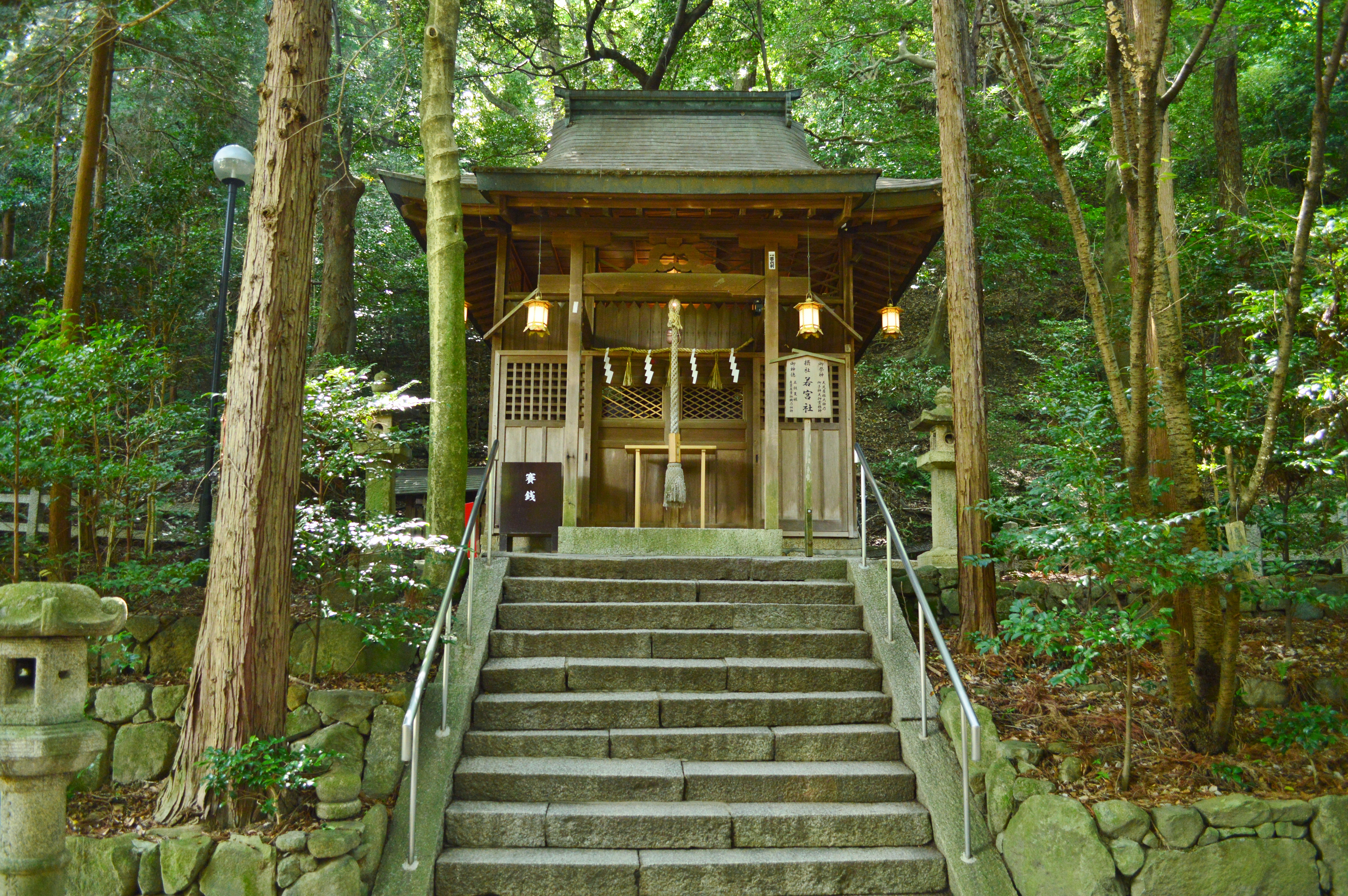
Wakamiya sub-shrine

== See also ==
- List of Shinto shrines
- ichinomiya
