= Tensho =

Tensho may refer to:

- Tenshō (Heian period) (天承), a Japanese era from 1131–1132
- Tenshō (Momoyama period) (天正), a Japanese era from 1573–1592
- Tensho (kata), a kata originating from Gōjū-ryū karate
- Tenshō (director) (天衝, born Motoki Tanaka (田中 基樹)), Japanese animation director
- 1586 Tenshō earthquake, seismic event in Japan

== See also ==
- 天照 (disambiguation) (Japanese: てんしょう, romanized: Tenshō); the Japanese term "天照" is pronounced as "tensho"
