= Emperor Sutoku =

Emperor of Japan from 1123 to 1142

Emperor Sutoku 崇徳天皇
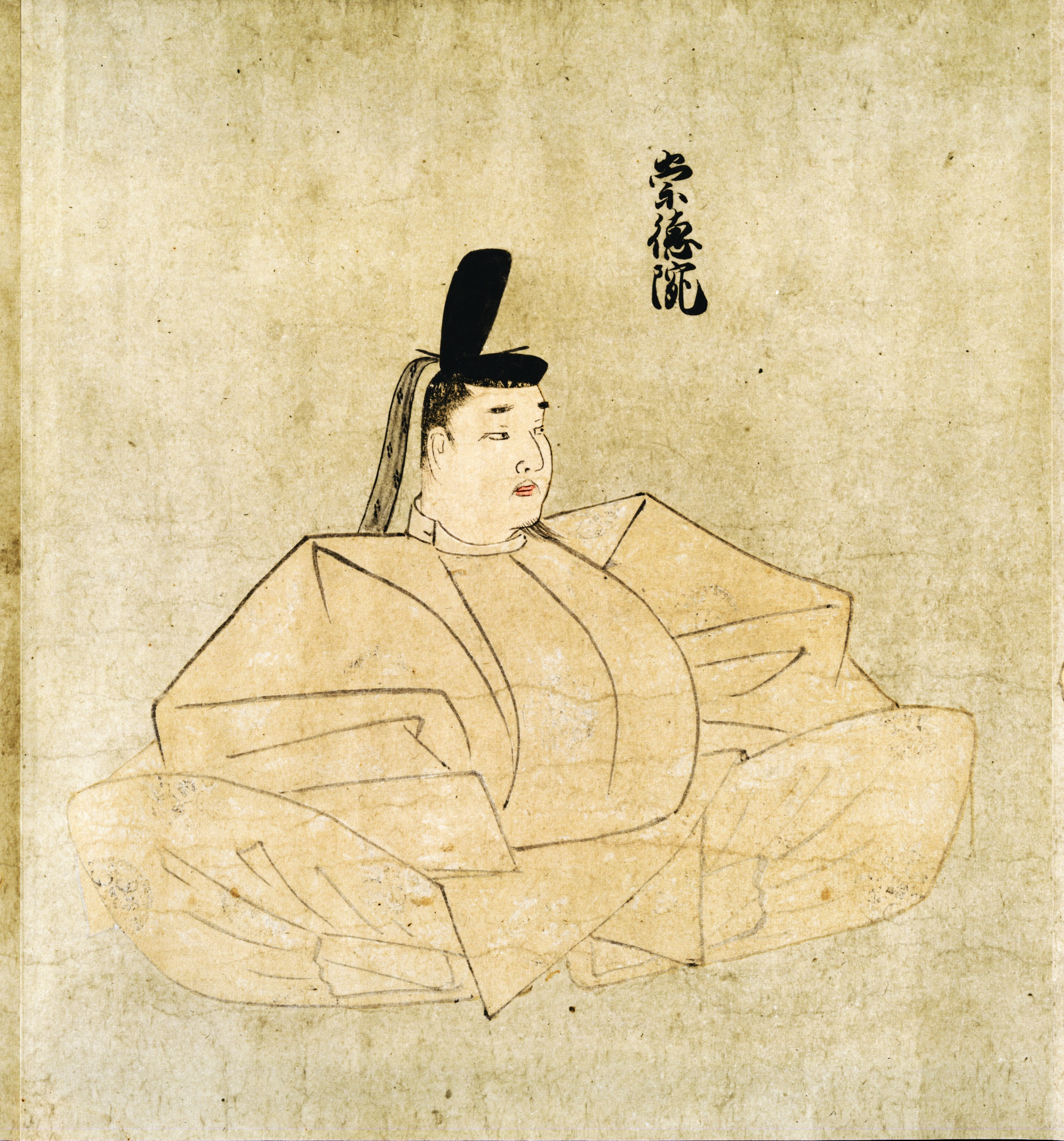
- Portrait from the Tenshi Sekkan Miei, c. 14th century

Emperor of Japan
- Reign: February 25, 1123 – January 5, 1142
- Enthronement: March 18, 1123
- Predecessor: Toba
- Successor: Konoe
- Born: July 7, 1119
- Died: September 14, 1164 (aged 45); Sanuki Province
- Burial: Shiramine no misasagi (白峯陵) (Kagawa)
- Spouse: Fujiwara no Kiyoko
- Issue: Prince Shigehito
Posthumous name
- Tsuigō: Emperor Sutoku (崇徳院 or 崇徳天皇)
- House: Imperial House of Japan
- Father: Emperor Toba
- Mother: Fujiwara no Tamako

Emperor Sutoku (崇徳天皇, Sutoku-tennō; July 7, 1119 – September 14, 1164) was the 75th emperor of Japan, according to the traditional order of succession. Along with Sugawara no Michizane and Taira no Masakado, he is known as one of the "Three Great Onryō of Japan".

Sutoku's reign in the late Heian period spanned 1123–1142.

== Genealogy ==
Before his ascension to the Chrysanthemum Throne, his personal name (his imina) was Akihito (顕仁). Sutoku was the eldest son of Emperor Toba. Some old texts say he was instead the son of Toba's grandfather, Emperor Shirakawa.

- Chūgū: Fujiwara no Kiyoko (藤原 聖子) later Kōkamon'in (皇嘉門院), Fujiwara no Tadamichi's daughter
- Hyounosuke-no-Tsubone (兵衛佐局), Minamoto no Masamune's adopted daughter
  - First son: Imperial Prince Shigehito (重仁親王) (1140–1162).
- Mikawa-dono (三河), Minamoto no Morotsune's daughter
  - Fifth Son: Kakue (覚恵; 1151–1184)
- Karasuma-no-Tsubone (烏丸局)

== Events of Sutoku's life ==
- February 25, 1123 (Hōan 4, 28th day of the 1st month): In the 16th year of Emperor Toba's reign (鳥羽天皇二十五年), he abdicated; and the succession (‘‘senso’’) was received by his son, aged 3.
- Hōan 4, in the 2nd month (1123): Emperor Sutoku is said to have acceded to the throne (sokui).
- 1124 (Tenji 1, 2nd month): Former Emperor Shirakawa and former-Emperor Toba went in carriages to the outside of the city, where they could all together enjoy contemplating the flowers. Fujiwara no Tamako (? – August 26, 1145), who was Toba's empress and Sutoku's mother, joined the procession along with many other women of the court. Their cortege was brilliant and colorful. A great many men of the court in hunting clothes followed the ladies in this parade. Fujiwara no Tadamichi then followed in a carriage, accompanied by bands of musicians and women who were to sing for the emperors.
- 1124 (Tenji 1, 10th month): Shirakawa visited Mount Kōya.
- 1125 (Tenji 2, 10th month): The emperor visited Iwashimizu Hachimangū and the Kamo shrines. Afterwards, he visited the Hirano, Ōharano, Mutsunoo, Kitano Tenman-gū, Yasaka (Gion), and several other shrines.
- 1128 (Daiji 3, 3rd month): Taiken-mon'in ordered the construction of Enshō-ji in fulfillment of a sacred vow. This was one in a series of "sacred vow temples" (gogan-ji) built by imperial command following a precedent established by Emperor Shirakawa's Hosshō-ji.
- 1128 (Daiji 3, 6th month): Fujiwara no Tadamichi is relieved of his responsibilities and duties as sesshō 'regent'; and simultaneously, Tadamichi is named kanpaku.
- August 17, 1135 (Hōen 1, 7th day of the 7th month): Former-Emperor Shirakawa died at the age of 77.
- 1141 (Eiji 1, 3rd month): The former emperor Toba accepted the tonsure in becoming a monk at the age of 39.

In 1151, Sutoku ordered an imperial waka anthology, Shika Wakashū.

In 1156, after being defeated by forces loyal to Emperor Go-Shirakawa in the Hōgen rebellion, he was exiled to Sanuki Province (modern-day Kagawa prefecture on the island of Shikoku).

Emperor Sutoku's reign lasted for 19 years: 2 years in the nengō Tenji, 5 years in Daiji, 1 year in Tenshō, 3 years in Chōshō, 6 years in Hōen, and 1 year in Eiji.

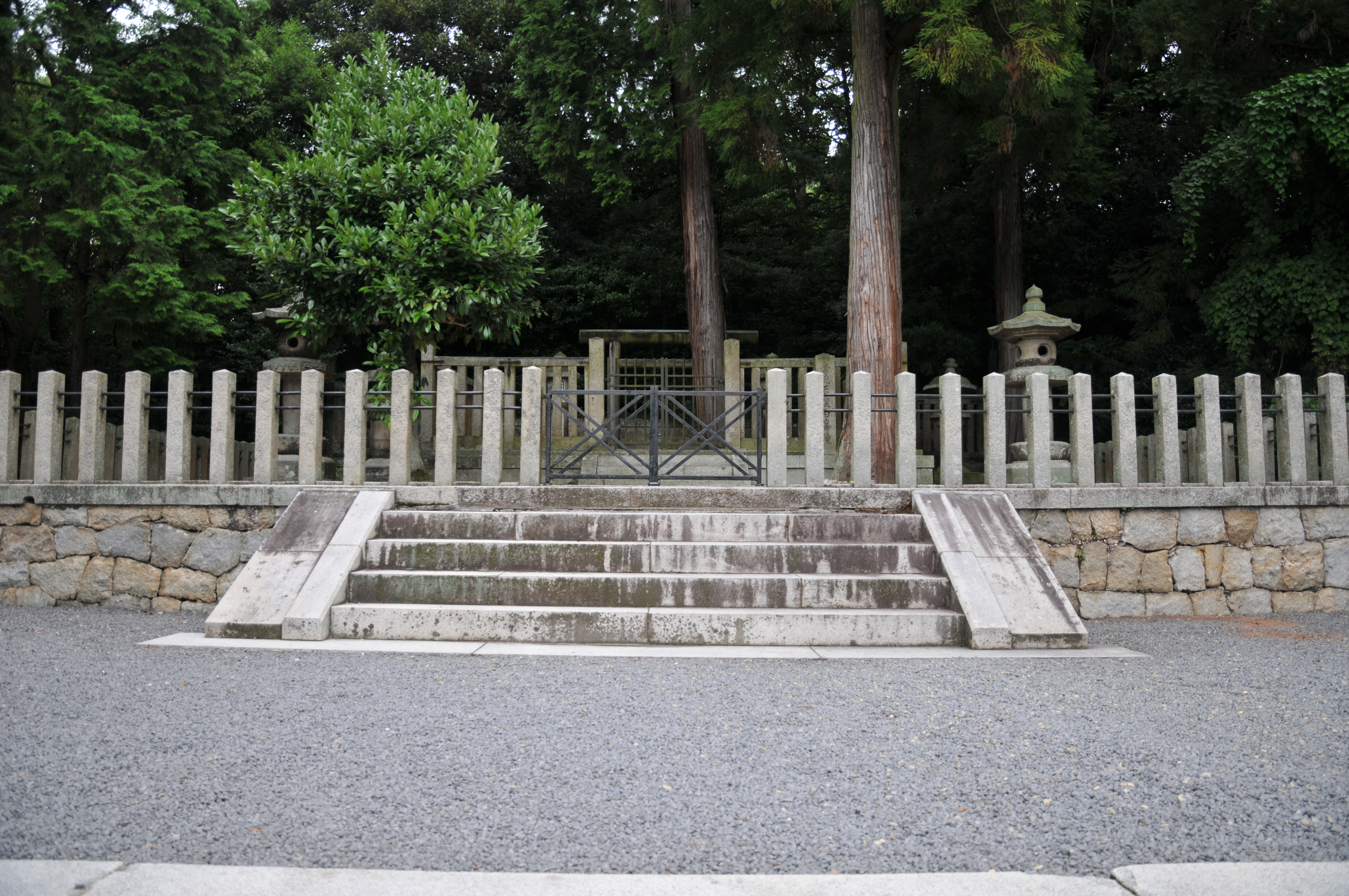
Mausolem (陵, misasagi) honoring Emperor Sutoku.

The site of Sutoku's grave is settled. This emperor is traditionally venerated at a mausoleum (陵, misasagi) in Sakaide, Kagawa. He was also enshrined in Shiramine Shrine in Kyoto and Kotohira-gū in Kagawa Prefecture. The former is also associated with the god of kemari ('football') worshipped by the kuge-rank Asukai family in times of yore, while the latter enshrined Ōmononushi, a god known to have restored harmony in the Yamato Kingdom (or blackmailed Emperor Sujin) in exchange for worship and nepotism.

The Imperial Household Agency designates this location as Sutoku's mausoleum. It is formally named Shiramine no misasagi.

=== Kugyō ===
Kugyō (公卿) is a collective term for the very few most powerful men attached to the imperial court. In general, this elite group included only three to four men at a time. These were hereditary courtiers whose experience and background would have brought them to the pinnacle of their careers. During Sutoku's reign, this apex of the Daijō-kan included:

- Sesshō, Fujiwara no Tadamichi, 1097–1164.
- Daijō-daijin, Fujiwara no Tadamichi.
- Sadaijin
- Udaijin
- Nadaijin, Fujiwara no Yorinaga, 1120–1156.
- Dainagon

== Eras of Sutoku's reign ==
The years of Sutoku's reign are more specifically identified by more than one era name or nengō.

- Hōan (1120–1124)
- Tenji (1124–1126)
- Daiji (1126–1131)
- Tenshō (1131–1132)
- Chōshō (1132–1135)
- Hōen (1135–1141)
- Eiji (1141–1142)

== Legends ==
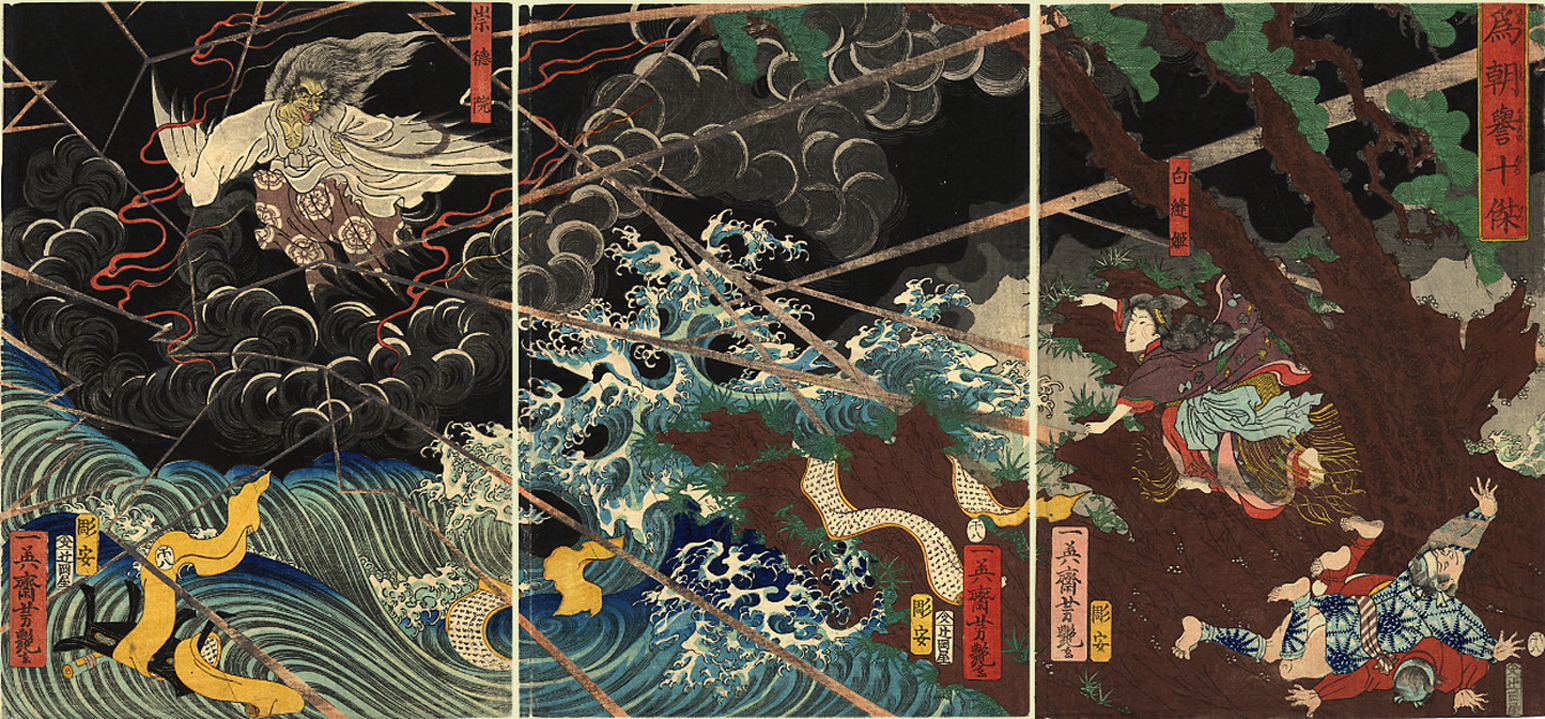
Sutoku becoming onryō (vengeful spirit), by Utagawa Yoshitsuya

After Sutoku's abdication and exile, he devoted himself to monastic life. He copied numerous scriptures and offered them to the court. Fearing that the scriptures were cursed, the court refused to accept them. Snubbed, Sutoku was said to have resented the court and, upon his death, became an onryō (怨霊, vengeful spirit). Everything from the subsequent fall in fortune of the Imperial court, the rise of the samurai powers, droughts and internal unrests were blamed on his haunting.

Along with Sugawara no Michizane and Taira no Masakado, he is often called one of the “Three Great Onryō of Japan”.

Literary works from the Edo period such as Ugetsu Monogatari and Chinsetsu Yumiharizuki (椿説弓張月) and ukiyo-e paintings by Utagawa Yoshitsuya depict Emperor Sutoku as an onryō.

In 2023, the heavy metal band Onmyo-Za produced the song Shiramine (白峯), about Emperor Sutoku as a onryō.

== Ancestry ==
Ancestors of Emperor Sutoku

8. Emperor Shirakawa (1053–1130)
4.Emperor Horikawa (1079–1107)
9. Fujiwara no Kenshi (1057–1084)
2. Emperor Toba (1103–1156)
10.Fujiwara no Sanesue (1035–1092)
5.Fujiwara no Ishi (1076–1103)
11.Fujiwara no Mutsuko
1. Emperor Sutoku
12.Fujiwara no Sanesue (1035–1092)
6. Fujiwara no Kinzane (1053–1107)
13. Fujiwara no Mutsuko
3. Fujiwara no Tamako (1101–1145)
14. Fujiwara no Takakata (1014–1079)
7. Fujiwara no Mitsuko (1060–1121)

== See also ==
- Emperor of Japan
- Goryō
- Imperial cult
- List of Emperors of Japan
- Shin Heike Monogatari (Taiga Drama), Masakazu Tamura played Emperor Sutoku.

== Notes ==
Japanese Imperial kamon — a stylized chrysanthemum blossom

Regnal titles
Preceded by Emperor Toba	Emperor of Japan: Sutoku; 1123–1142	Succeeded by Emperor Konoe
