= Gen'ei =

Period of Japanese history (1118–1120 CE)

Gen'ei (元永) was a Japanese era name (年号, nengō; lit. "year name") after Eikyū and before Hōan. This period spanned the years from April 1118 through April 1120. The reigning emperor was Emperor Toba-tennō (鳥羽天皇).

== Change of Era ==
- January 24, 1118 Gen'ei gannen (元永元年): The new era name was created to mark an event or series of events. The previous era ended and the new one commenced in Eikyū 6, on the 3rd day of the 4th month of 1118.

== Events of the Gen'ei Era ==
- 1118 (Gen'ei 1, 9th month): The emperor made a pilgrimage to the Kumano Shrines in Wakayama. These Kumano sanzan are: Hongu Taisha, Hayatama Taisha, and Nachi Taisha.
- 1118 (Gen'ei 1, 12th month): Emperor Toba attended a festival organized by Saishō-ji. This temple had been established under the auspices of his Imperial patronage.
- 1119 (Gen'ei 2, 8th month): Arihito, a Prince of the blood, was honored with the name Minamoto; and he was elevated to the 2nd rank of the 3rd class. Arihito's father, Sukehito-shinnō, was the third son of Emperor Go-Sanjō, and the younger brother of Emperor Toba. Arihito is said to have excelled in the arts of poetry.

== Notes ==
Preceded by Eikyū	Era or nengō Gen'ei; 1118–1120	Succeeded by Hōan
