= Utagawa Yoshitsuya =

Japanese ukiyo-e artist (1822–1866)

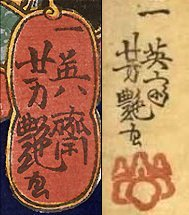
Signatures of Utagawa Yoshitsuya, both reading “Ichieisai Yoshitsuya ga” (一英斎 芳艶 画)

Utagawa Yoshitsuya (歌川 芳艶; February 22, 1822 – August 2, 1866), also known as Kōko Yoshitsuya (甲胡 芳艶) and as Ichieisai Yoshitsuya (一英斎 芳艶), was a Japanese designer of ukiyo-e woodblock prints.

Yoshitsuya was a student of Utagawa Kuniyoshi and, like his teacher, is best known for his woodblock prints of warriors. Yoshitsuya also produced many advertisements and designs for tattoos. Yoshitsuya entered Kuniyoshi's studio at the age of fifteen and, like his teacher, is best known for his woodblock prints of warriors (musha-e). He was also known for his tattoo designs during the 1840s and 1850s, and for prints of legendary animals used as caricatures of political events to evade censorship. Yoshitsuya also produced many advertisements.

Yoshitsuya's students include Utagawa Kazutoyo (active c. 1862–70), Utagawa Yoshitoyo II (active c. 1862–77) and Yoshitsuya II (active c. 1870s).

== Gallery ==
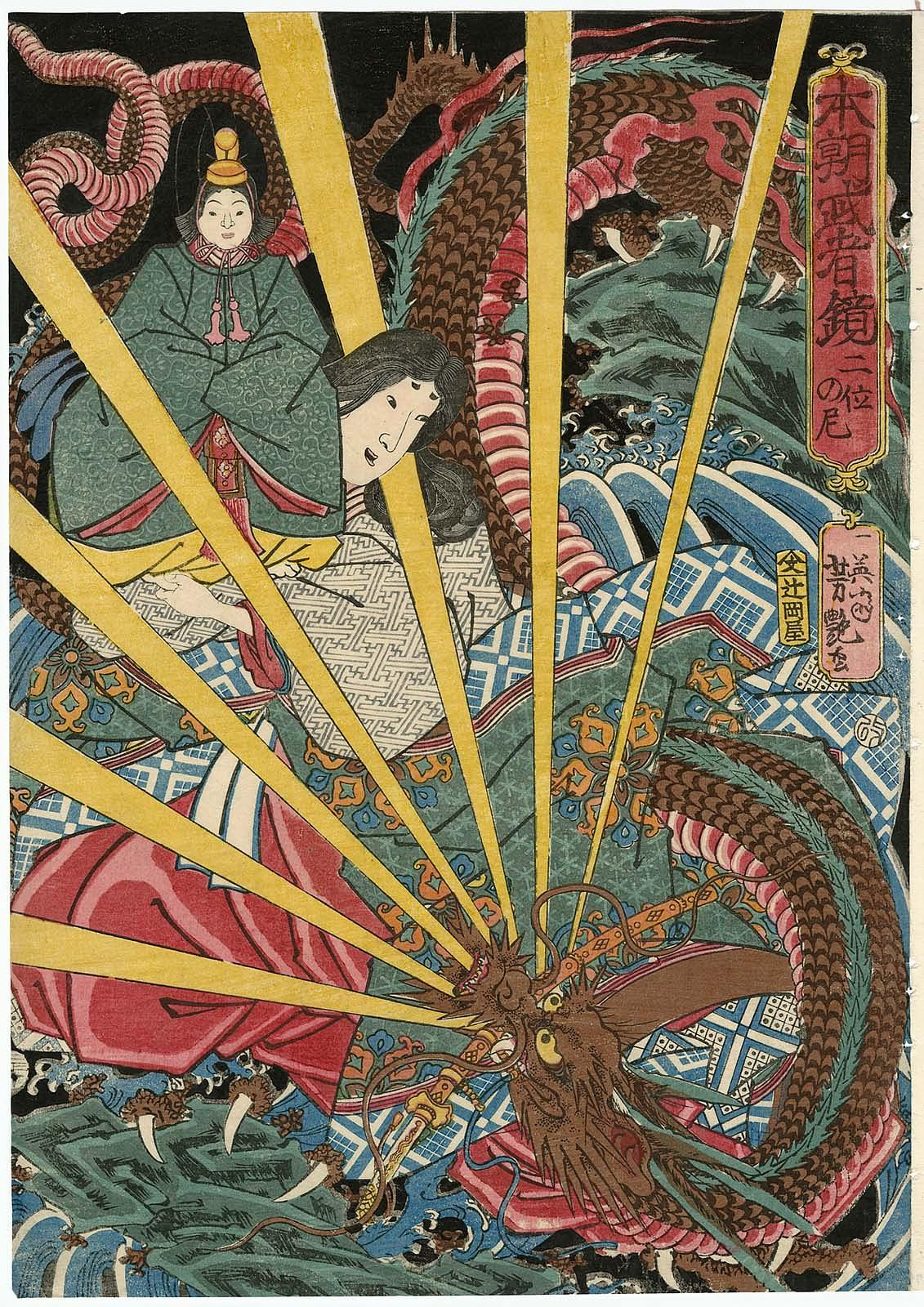
Nii no Ama jumped overboard with Emperor Antoku after the lost battle of Dan-no-ura.

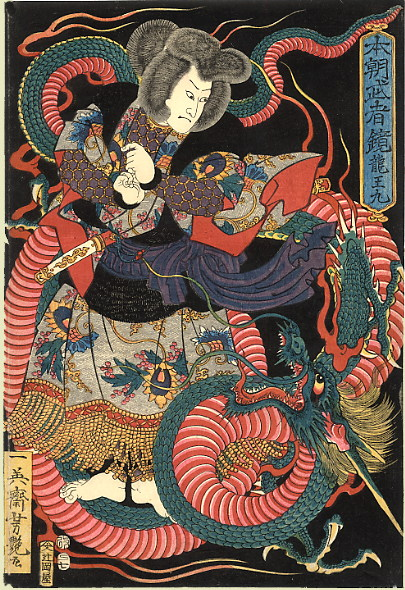
The magician Ryūōmaru encircled by a dragon
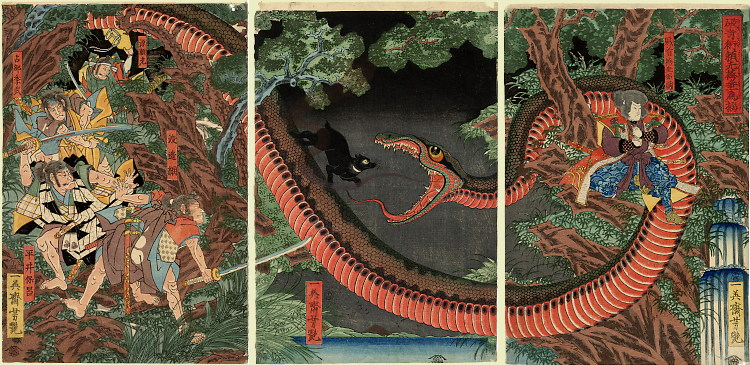
Battle between Minamoto no Yorimitsu with his men and the robber chief Hakamadare no Mochisuke who is aided by a giant serpent. Triptych.

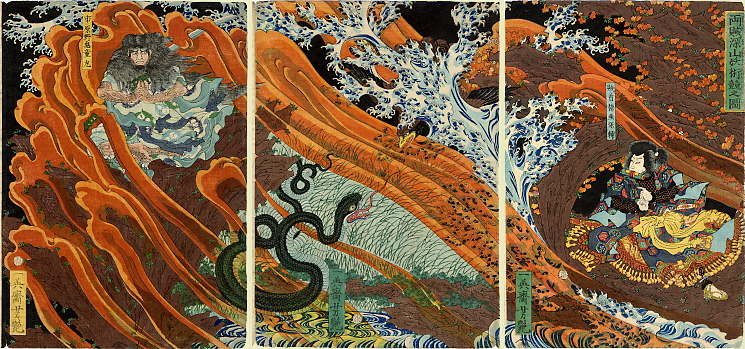
Battle of magic between the bandit chief Hakamadare no Mochisuke who is transformed into a bird of prey and Kidomaru who is transformed into a giant serpent. Triptych.

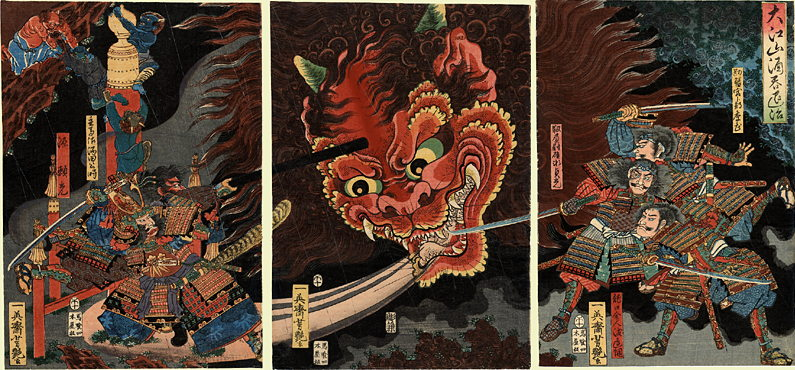
Minamoto no Yorimitsu attempting to exterminate the detached head of Shuten-dōji at Mount Ōe. Triptych.

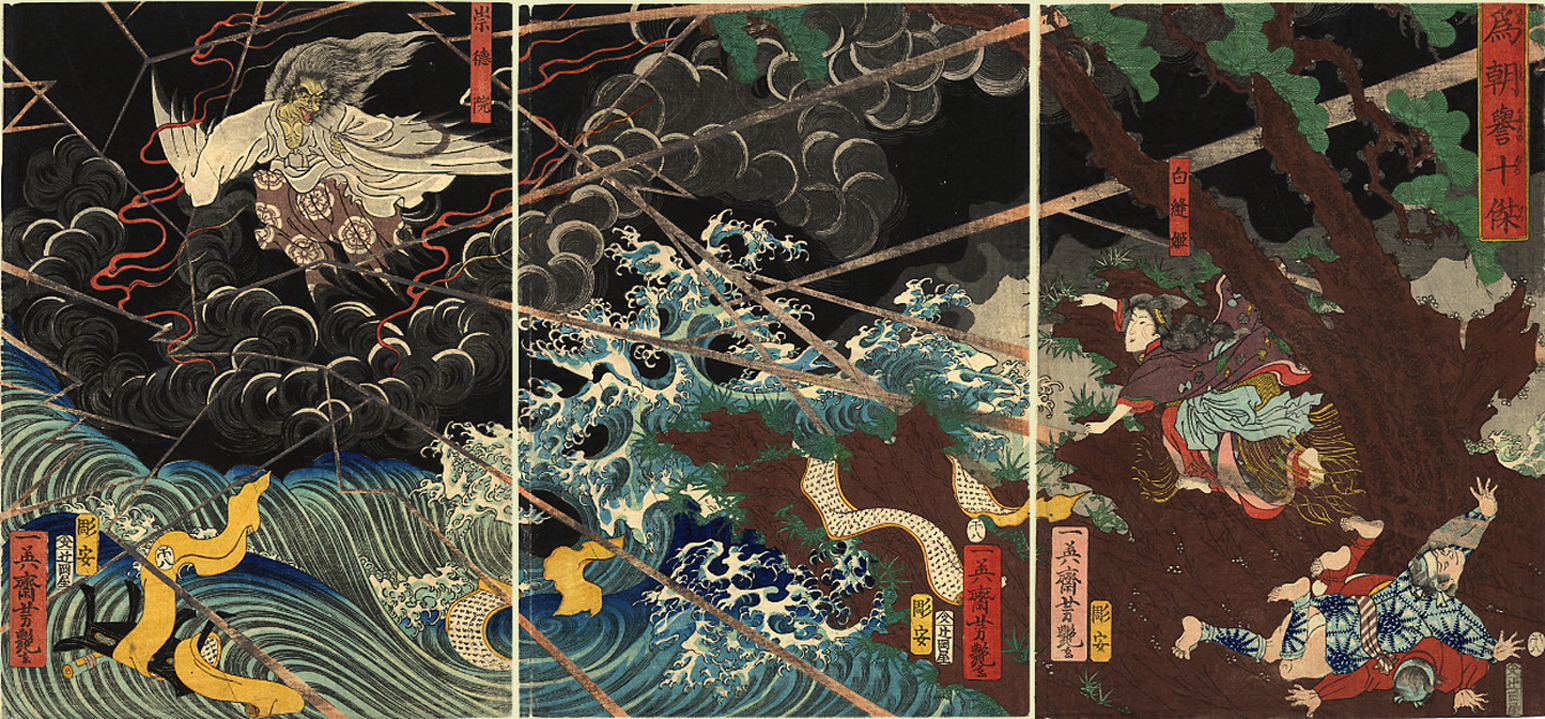
Princess Shiranui fighting the evil Sotoku-in. Triptych from the series Ten Heroes of the Tametomo
