= Ten'ei =

Period of Japanese history (1110–1113 CE)

Ten'ei (天永) was a Japanese era name (年号, nengō, lit. "year name") after Tennin and before Eikyū. This period spanned the years from July 1110 through July 1113. The reigning emperor was Emperor Toba-tennō (鳥羽天皇).

== Change of Era ==
- January 22, 1110 Ten'ei gannen (天永元年): The new era name was created to mark an event or series of events. The previous era ended and the new one commenced in Tennin 4, on the 16th day of the 7th month of 1110.

== Events of the Ten'ei Era ==
- 1109 (Ten'ei 1, in the 5th month): Emperor Toba visited Hosho-ji where he donated a Buddhist manuscript which had been created using gold characters on blue paper.
- 1110 (Ten'ei 1, in the 6th month): The Miidera-ji burned down. This was the second time the temple was destroyed by fire, the first time being in 1081.

== Notes ==
Preceded by Tennin	Era or nengō Ten'ei; 1110–1113	Succeeded by Eikyū
