= Eikyū =

Period of Japanese history (1113–1118 CE)

Eikyū (永久) was a Japanese era name (年号, nengō; lit. "year name") after Ten-ei and before Gen'ei. This period spanned the years from July 1113 through April 1118. The reigning emperor was Emperor Toba-tennō (鳥羽天皇).

== Change of Era ==
- January 20, 1113 Eikyū gannen (永久元年): The new era name was created to mark an event or series of events. The previous era ended and the new one commenced in Ten'ei 4, on the thirteenth day of the seventh month of 1113.

== Events of the Eikyū Era ==
- 1113 (Eikyū 1, 4th month): Fujiwara Tadasane was named kampaku.
- 1113 (Eikyū 1, 4th month): Emperor Toba visited the Matsunoo Shrine and the Kitano Tenman-gū. When the emperor visits Shinto shrines, it is always a pleasure party for him. Without this pretext, court etiquette did not permit him to leave the palace.
- 1113 (Eikyū 1, 10th month): Toba visited the temples on Mount Hiei in the vicinity of Kyoto.
- 1113 (Eikyū 1, 11th month ): Toba visited the Inari Shrine and the Gion Shrine.

== Notes ==
Preceded by Ten-ei	Era or nengō Eikyū; 1113–1118	Succeeded by Gen'ei
