= Ame-no-Koyane =

Kami and Male deity in Shinto

- God of Divine Mirror, Great Divination, Divine Affairs
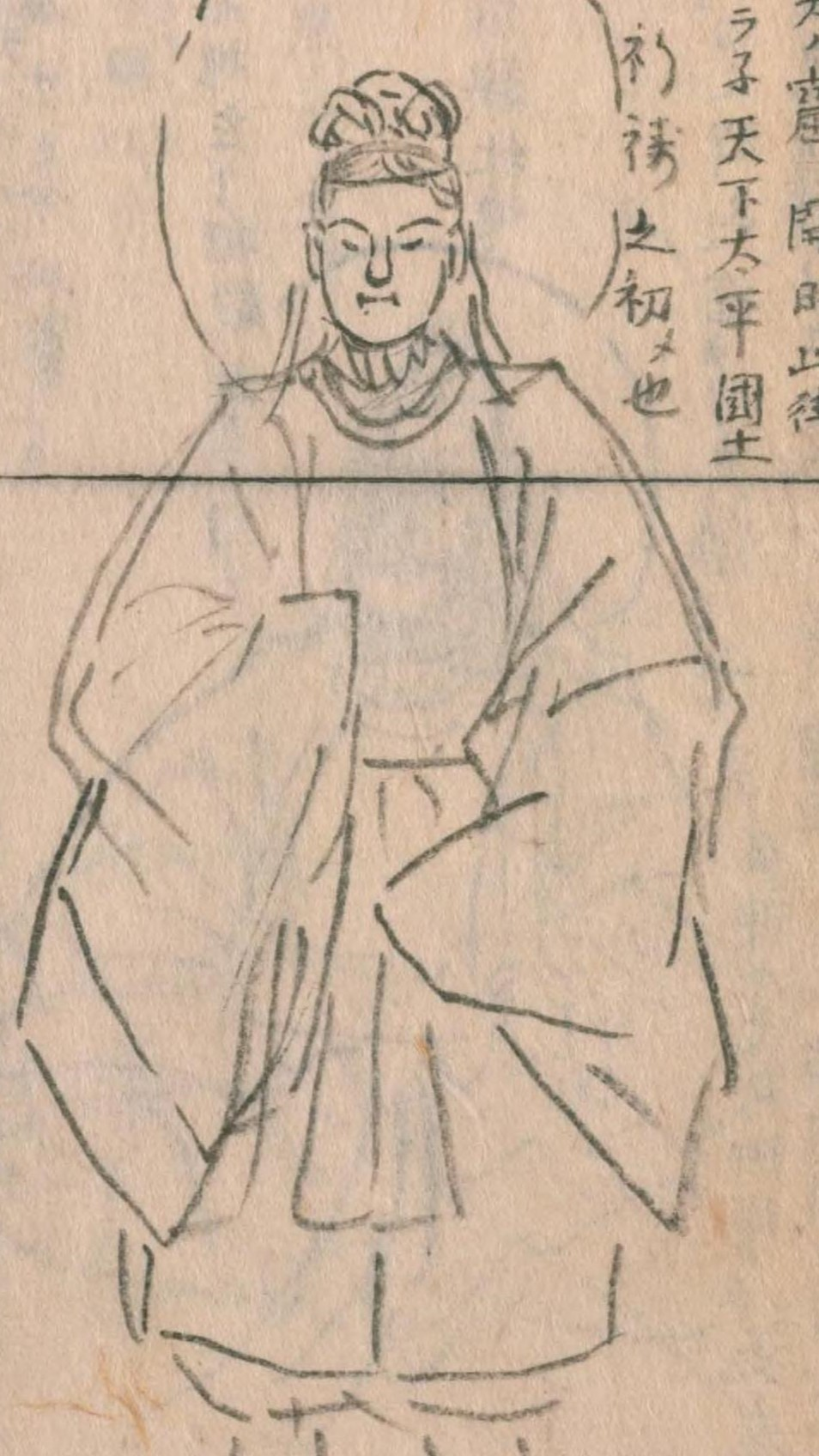
- Japanese: 天児屋命
- Major cult center: Kasuga Grand Shrine; Hiraoka Shrine; Yoshida Shrine; Ōharano Shrine
- Texts: Kojiki, Nihon Shoki, Izumo-no-kuni Fudoki

Genealogy
- Parents: Kamimusubi (Kogo Shūi), Kogotomusuhi (Nihon Shoki)
- Children: Ame-no-Oshikumone; Uwaharu; Shitaharu; Tamakushi-hime

Ame-no-Koyane-no-mikoto (天児屋命, 天児屋根命) is a kami and a male deity in Japanese mythology and Shinto. He is the ancestral god of the Nakatomi clan, and Fujiwara no Kamatari, the founder of the powerful Fujiwara clan. An Amatsukami, 'Kami of heaven', he resides in Takamagahara.

== Mythology ==
According to Kogo Shūi and Kashima Shrine's genealogy, Ame-no-Koyane is the son of the creator deity Kamimusubi, one of the first three gods to come into existence. However, according to Nihon Shoki, he is the son of Kogotomusubi (興台産霊命).

According to Nihon Shoki, Ame-no-Koyane was "the first in charge of divine affairs, for which reason he was made to serve by performing the Greater Divination." He was commanded by Amaterasu to guard the divine mirror, and was known as the "Imperial Aide" at the Imperial Palace, being in charge of divine affairs of the palace.

According to Japanese mythology, Ame-no-Koyane performed a ritual prayer to the sun goddess Amaterasu to call her out of the cave of Ama-no-Iwato and bring light back to the world, after Susanoo, the god of storms, drove her away. During tenson kōrin, he acted as one of the five gods descending from heaven accompanying Ninigi, thus becoming the ancestor of the Nakatomi clan.

== Shrines ==
Ame-no-Koyane is worshipped at:

- Hiraoka Shrine
- Kasuga Grand Shrine
- Ōharano Shrine
- Yoshida Shrine
- and all Kasuga Shrines in Japan.
