= Kajō =

Period of Japanese history (1106-1108 AD)

Kajō (嘉承), also romanized as Kashō, was a Japanese era name (年号, nengō, "year name") after Chōji and before Tennin. This period spanned the years from April 1106 through August 1108. The reigning emperors were Horikawa-tennō (堀河天皇) and Toba-tennō (鳥羽天皇).

== Change of era ==
- February 6, 1106 Kajō gannen (嘉承元年): The new era name was created to mark an event or series of events. The previous era ended and the new one commenced in Chōji 3, on the 9th day of the 4th month of 1106.

== Events of the Kajō era ==
- October 3, 1106 (Kajō 1): Petitions seeking mitigation of "evil influences on the Emperor" were presented at major Shinto shrines.
- August 19, 1107 (Kajō 1, 19th day of the 7th month): In the 21st year of Emperor Horikawa-tennō's reign (堀河天皇21年), the emperor died at the age of 29; and the succession (senso) was received by his only son. Shortly thereafter, Emperor Toba is said to have acceded to the throne (sokui).

== Notes ==
Preceded by Chōji	Era or nengō Kajō; 1106–1108	Succeeded by Tennin
