= Yoshida Kanetomo =

Japanese priest (1435–1511)

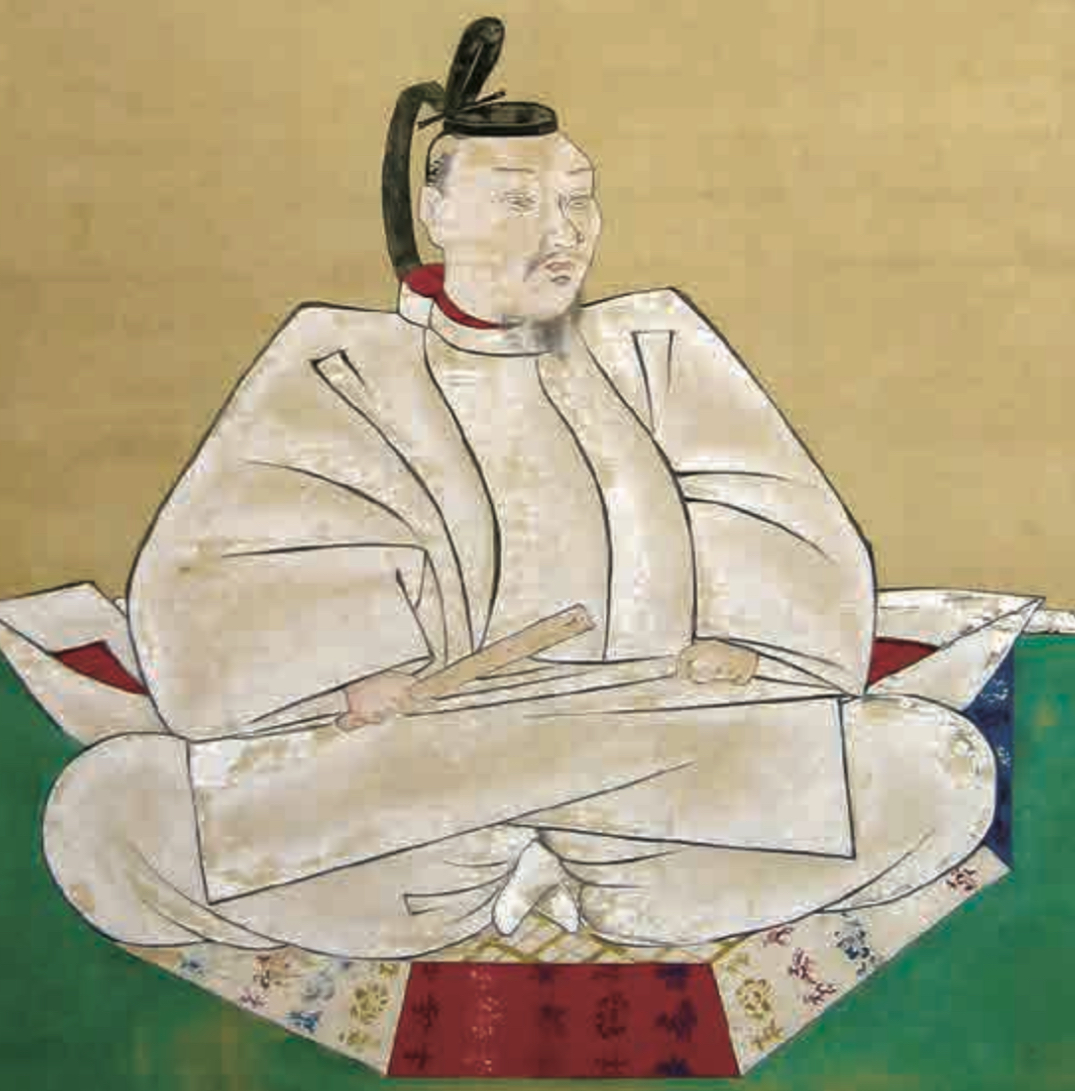

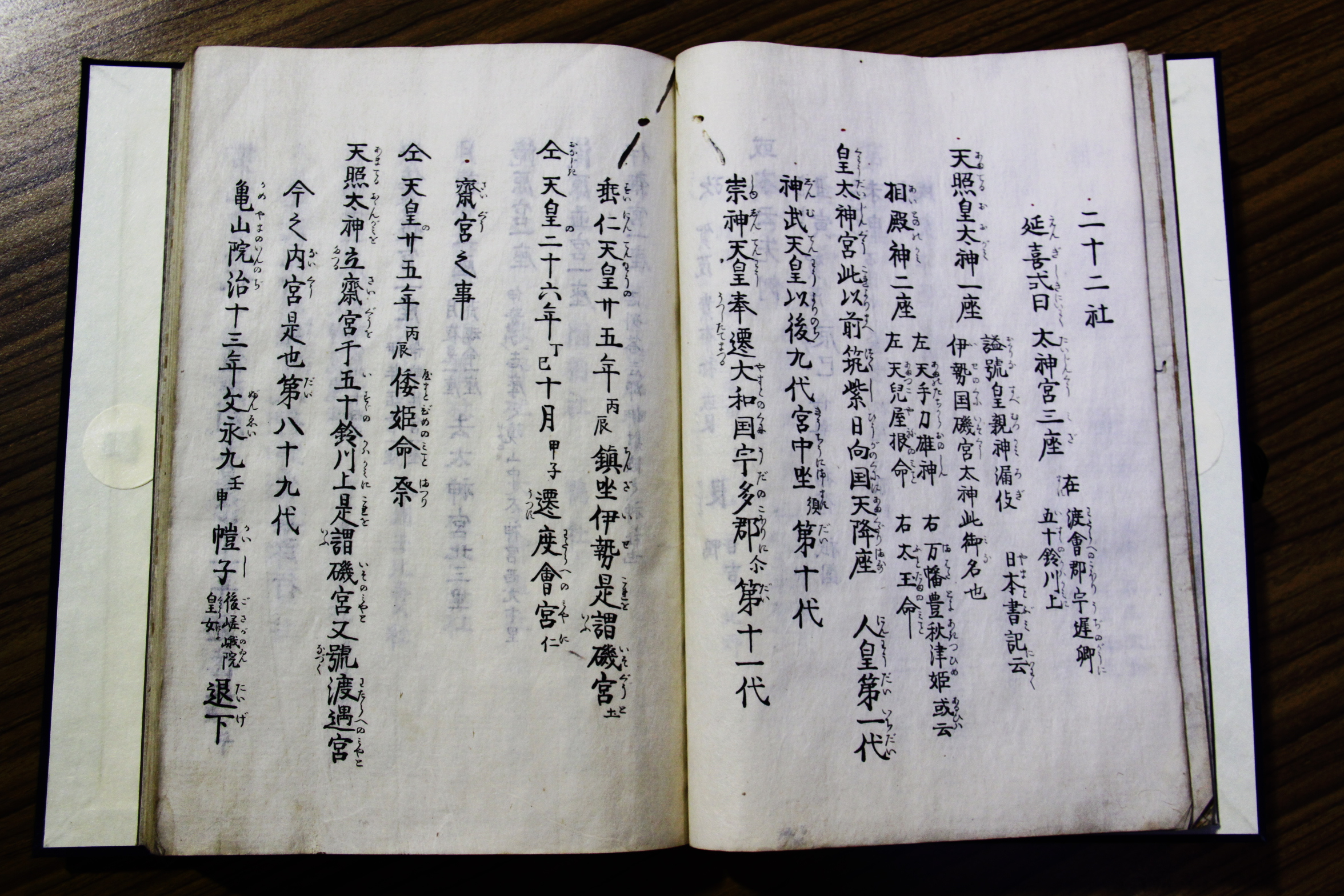
A copy of the Nijūnisha Chūshiki by Yoshida Kanetomo

Yoshida Kanetomo (吉田 兼倶; 1435–1511) was a Japanese Shinto priest of the Sengoku period. He was a seminal figure in the evolution of a coherent descriptive and interpretive schema of Shinto ritual and mythology.

== Career ==
Kanetomo progressed gradually through the ranks of the Imperial offices in the Jingi-kan (Department of Shinto Affairs), which was one of the Imperial bureaucracies which were set up under the ritsuryō system in the 8th century. Kanetomo's eventually became an Imperial Chamberlain (侍従, jijū). Other positions he held at different times were Senior Assistant Director of Divinities (神祇大輔, jingi taifu) and Vice Director of the Board of Censors (弾正台弼, danjōdai hitsu).

- 1511 (Eishō 8, 2nd month): When Kanetomo died at the age of 77, his passing was considered a significant event in the chronicles of the Imperial history of Japan.

== Yoshida Shinto ==
The early period Shinto school founded by Kanetomo was called Genpon-Sōgen Shinto ("Shinto of the Original Founder"), also known as Yuiitsu Shintō ("One-and-only Shintō"). Prior to Kanetomo, the understanding and practice of Shinto was intermingled with Japanese Buddhism. Sanetomo invested a lifetime in a process of disentangling what were thereafter construed as the two distinct entities.

=== Inverted honji suijaku ===
The term honji suijaku expresses a Japanese Buddhist theory according to which a perceived Shinto kami is the manifestation of a Buddhist god. This theory proposed and presumed that the resulting dual entity would necessarily have a fundamental Buddhist core, and that any Shinto aspect was secondary.

In the late Kamakura period, a counter-theory arose which also began with the notion of such dual entities; however, the counter-theorists construed that the kami side was primary and the Buddhist one was secondary. This came to be known as the Inverted honji suijaku.

Kanetomo was influenced by these ideas and brought them further. He proposed to set aside the conceptual theories of such entities.

Up through the end of the Edo period, Kanetomo's followers and the Yoshida Shrine were granted the right to award ranks to all shrines and priests except for those associated with the Imperial family.

== See also ==
- Shinto sects and schools
- Kunitokotachi
