= Emperor Toba =

Emperor of Japan from 1107 to 1123

Emperor Toba 鳥羽天皇
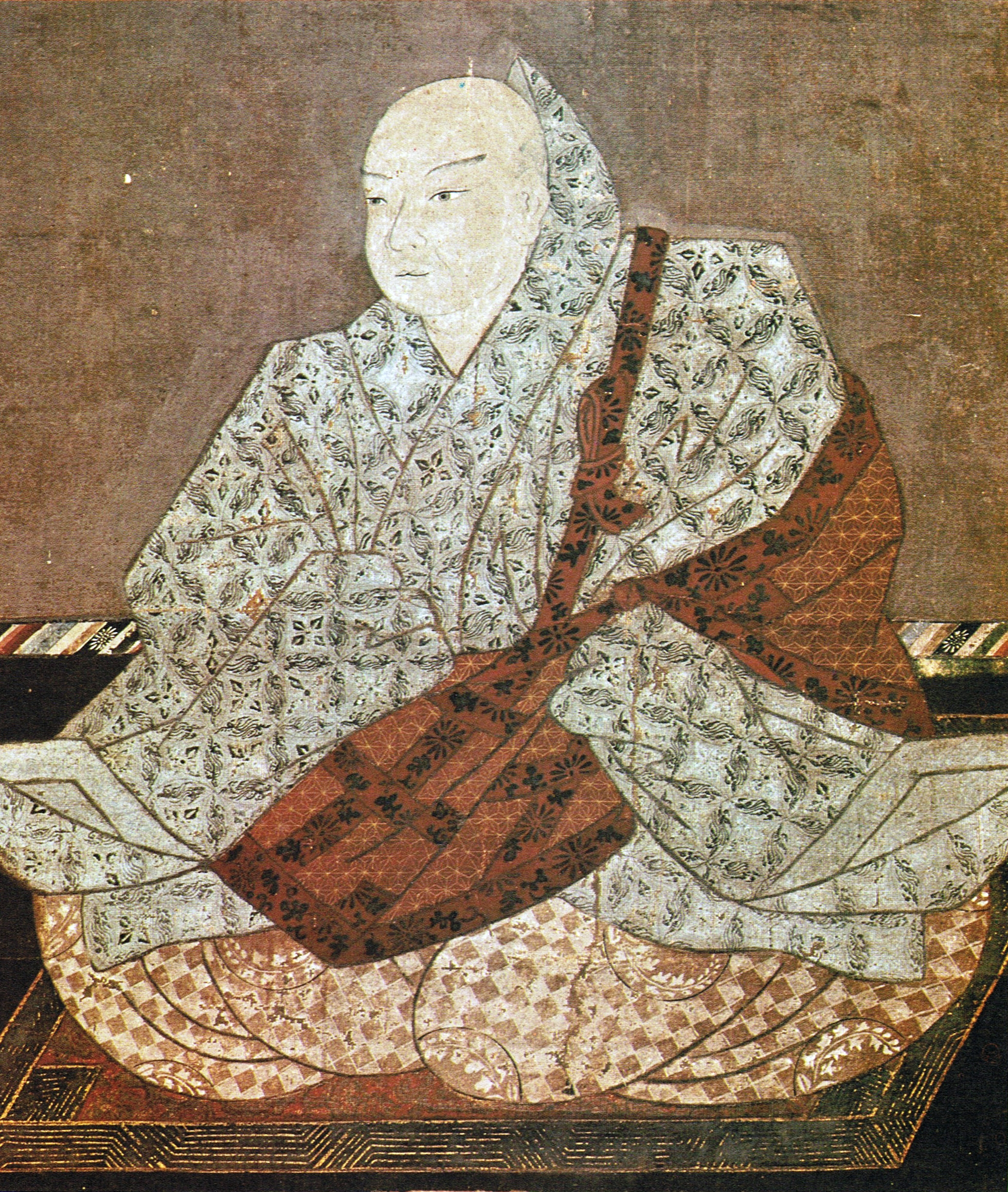

Emperor of Japan
- Reign: August 9, 1107 – February 25, 1123
- Enthronement: January 15, 1108
- Predecessor: Horikawa
- Successor: Sutoku
- Born: February 24, 1103
- Died: July 20, 1156 (aged 53); Anrakuju-in
- Burial: Anrakuju-in no misasagi (Kyoto)
- Spouse: Fujiwara no Yasuko; Fujiwara no Nariko; Fujiwara no Tamako
- Issue among others...: Emperor Sutoku; Princess Muneko; Emperor Go-Shirakawa; Princess Shōshi; Emperor Konoe; Princess Yoshiko
Posthumous name
- Tsuigō: Emperor Toba (鳥羽院 or 鳥羽天皇)
- House: Imperial House of Japan
- Father: Emperor Horikawa
- Mother: Fujiwara no Ishi

Emperor Toba (鳥羽天皇, Toba-tennō; February 24, 1103 – July 20, 1156) was the 74th Emperor of Japan, according to the traditional order of succession.

Toba's reign spanned the years from 1107 through 1123.

== Genealogy ==
Before his ascension to the Chrysanthemum Throne, his personal name (his imina) was Munehito-shinnō (宗仁親王).

He was the son of Emperor Horikawa. His mother was Empress Dowager Fujiwara no Ishi (藤原苡子)

Toba had three Empresses, some consort ladies and 14 imperial sons and daughters.

- chūgū : Fujiwara no Tamako (藤原璋子) later Taikenmon'in (待賢門院), Fujiwara no Kinzane's daughter
  - First Son: Imperial Prince Akihito (顕仁親王) later Emperor Sutoku
  - First Daughter: Imperial Princess Yoshiko/Kishi (禧子内親王; 1122–1133) – Saiin at Kamo Shrine
  - Second Son: Imperial Prince Michihito (通仁親王; 1124–1129)
  - Third Son: Imperial Prince Kimihito (君仁親王; 1125–1143)
  - Second Daughter: Imperial Princess Muneko (統子内親王) later Jōsaimon-in (上西門院), – Saiin at Kamo Shrine.
  - Fourth Son: Imperial Prince Masahito (雅仁親王) later Emperor Go-Shirakawa
  - Fifth Son: Imperial Prince Motohito? (本仁親王; 1129–1169) later Imperial Prince priest Kakushō (覚性法親王)
- kōgō: Fujiwara no Yasuko/Taishi (藤原泰子) later Kōyō-in (高陽院), Fujiwara no Tadazane's daughter
- kōgō: Fujiwara no Nariko (藤原得子) later Bifukumon'in (美福門院), Fujiwara no Nagazane's daughter.
  - Daughter: Imperial Princess Toshiko/Eishi (叡子内親王; 1135–1148)
  - Daughter: Imperial Princess Akiko (暲子内親王; 1137–1211) later Hachijo'in (八条院)
  - Ninth Son: Imperial Prince Narihito (体仁親王), later Emperor Konoe
  - Daughter: Imperial Imperial Princess Yoshiko/Shushi (姝子内親王) later Takamatsu'in (高松院), chūgū (Empress) to Emperor Nijō)
- Court Lady Ki Ieko (紀家子), Mino-no-Tsubone (美濃局), Ki no Mitsukiyo's daughter
  - Sixth Son: Imperial Prince Priest Dōkei (道恵法親王; 1132–1168)
  - Seventh Son: Imperial Prince Priest Kakukai (覚快法親王; 1134–1181)
  - Daughter: Aya Gozen (阿夜御前; d.1195)
- Sanjō-no-Tsubone (三条局; d.1138), Fujiwara no Iemasa's daughter
  - Daughter: Imperial Princess Kenshi (妍子内親王; d.1161) Yoshida saigū (Imperial Princess serving at Ise Shrine)
- Kasuga-no-Tsubone (春日局), Tokudaiji Saneyosi's daughter
  - Seventh Daughter: Imperial Princess Shōshi/Nobuko (頌子内親王; 1145–1208)
- Fujitsubo-Nyogo (藤壺女御), Tachibana Toshitsuna's daughter
  - Shin-yo? (真誉) – Buddhist nun
- Tosa-no-Tsubone (土佐局), Minamoto no Mitsuyasu's daughter
- Fujiwara no Sanehira's Daughter
  - Daughter: Princess Takamatsu (高松宮) (apparently no connection with Arisugawa-no-miya, which was originally named Takamatsu-no-miya)
- Unknown
  - Imperial Prince Priest Saichū (最忠法親王)
  - Imperial Prince Dōka? (道果親王)

== Events of Toba's life ==
When his mother died, his grandfather, former-Emperor Shirakawa, took him under his care and raised him.

- August 9, 1107 (Kajō 2, 19th day of the 7th month): In the 21st year of Emperor Horikawa's reign (堀河天皇21年), the emperor ("tennō") died at the age of 29; and the succession (senso) was received by his only son. Shortly thereafter, Emperor Toba is said to have acceded to the throne (sokui).

During the initial years of Toba's reign, the actual power was held by his grandfather, the "retired" Emperor Shirakawa, in a process known as cloistered rule.

- 1110 (Ten'ei 3, 6th month): The Miidera-ji burned down. This was the second time the temple was destroyed by fire, the first time being in 1081.
- February 25, 1123 (Hōan 4, 28th day of the 1st month): In the 17th year of Emperor Toba's reign (鳥羽天皇17年), Toba was forced to abdicate by his grandfather, retired-Emperor Shirakawa. Toba gave up the throne in favor of his son Akihito, who would become Emperor Sutoku. Toba was only 20 years old when he renounced his title; and he had already reigned for 16 years: two in the nengō Tennin, three in Ten'ei, five in the nengō Eikyū, two in Gen'ei, and four in the nengō Hōan. At this time, Toba took the title Daijō-tennō. The succession (senso) was received by his son.
- 1123 (Hōan 4, 2nd month): Emperor Sutoku is said to have acceded to the throne (sokui).
- 1129 (Daiji 4): "retired" Emperor Shirakawa died; and Toba himself began to rule as cloistered emperor. Toba continued to hold power through the reigns of three emperors, Emperor Sutoku, Emperor Konoe, and Emperor Go-Shirakawa.
- 1134 (Chōshō 3): The former-Emperor Toba made a pilgrimage to the Kumano Shrines. He was accompanied by sadaijin Hanazono no Arahito and udaijin Naka-no-in Munetada. The excursion was enjoyed by all, and great quantities of sake were consumed.

=== Kugyō ===
Kugyō (公卿) is a collective term for the very few most powerful men attached to the court of the Emperor of Japan in pre-Meiji eras. Even during those years in which the court's actual influence outside the palace walls was minimal, the hierarchic organization persisted.

In general, this elite group included only three to four men at a time. These were hereditary courtiers whose experience and background would have brought them to the pinnacle of a life's career. During Toba's reign, this apex of the Daijō-kan included:

- Sesshō, Fujiwara Tadazane, 1078–1162.
- Kampaku, Fujiwara Tadazane.
- Kampaku, Fujiwara Tadamichi, 1097–1164.
- Daijō-daijin, Fujiwara Tadazane.
- Sadaijin, Fujiwara Tadamichi.
- Sadaijin, Hanazono no Arahito.
- Udaijin, Naka-no-in Munetada.
- Naidaijin
- Dainagon

== Eras of Toba's reign ==
The years of Toba's reign are more specifically identified by more than one era name or nengō.

- Kajō (1106–1108)
- Tennin (1108–1110)
- Ten-ei (1110–1113)
- Eikyū (1113–1118)
- Gen'ei (1118–1120)
- Hōan (1120–1124)

== Ancestry ==
Ancestors of Emperor Toba

8.Emperor Go-Sanjō (1034–1073)
4.Emperor Shirakawa (1053–1130)
9.Fujiwara no Shigeko (d. 1062)
2. Emperor Horikawa (1079–1107)
10.Minamoto no Akifusa (1037–1094)
5.Fujiwara no Kenshi (1057–1084)
11.Minamoto no Takako
1. Emperor Toba
12.Fujiwara no Kin'nari (999–1043)
6.Fujiwara no Sanesue (1035–1092)
13. Fujiwara
3. Fujiwara no Ishi (1076–1103)
14. Fujiwara no Tsunehira (1014–1091)
7.Fujiwara no Mutsuko

== See also ==
- Emperor of Japan
- List of Emperors of Japan
- Imperial cult
- Emperor Go-Toba

== Notes ==
Japanese Imperial kamon — a stylized chrysanthemum blossom

Regnal titles
Preceded by Emperor Horikawa	Emperor of Japan: Toba; 1107–1123	Succeeded by Emperor Sutoku
