= Anrakuju-in =

Buddhist temple in Fushimi, Kyoto, Japan

- 安楽寿院
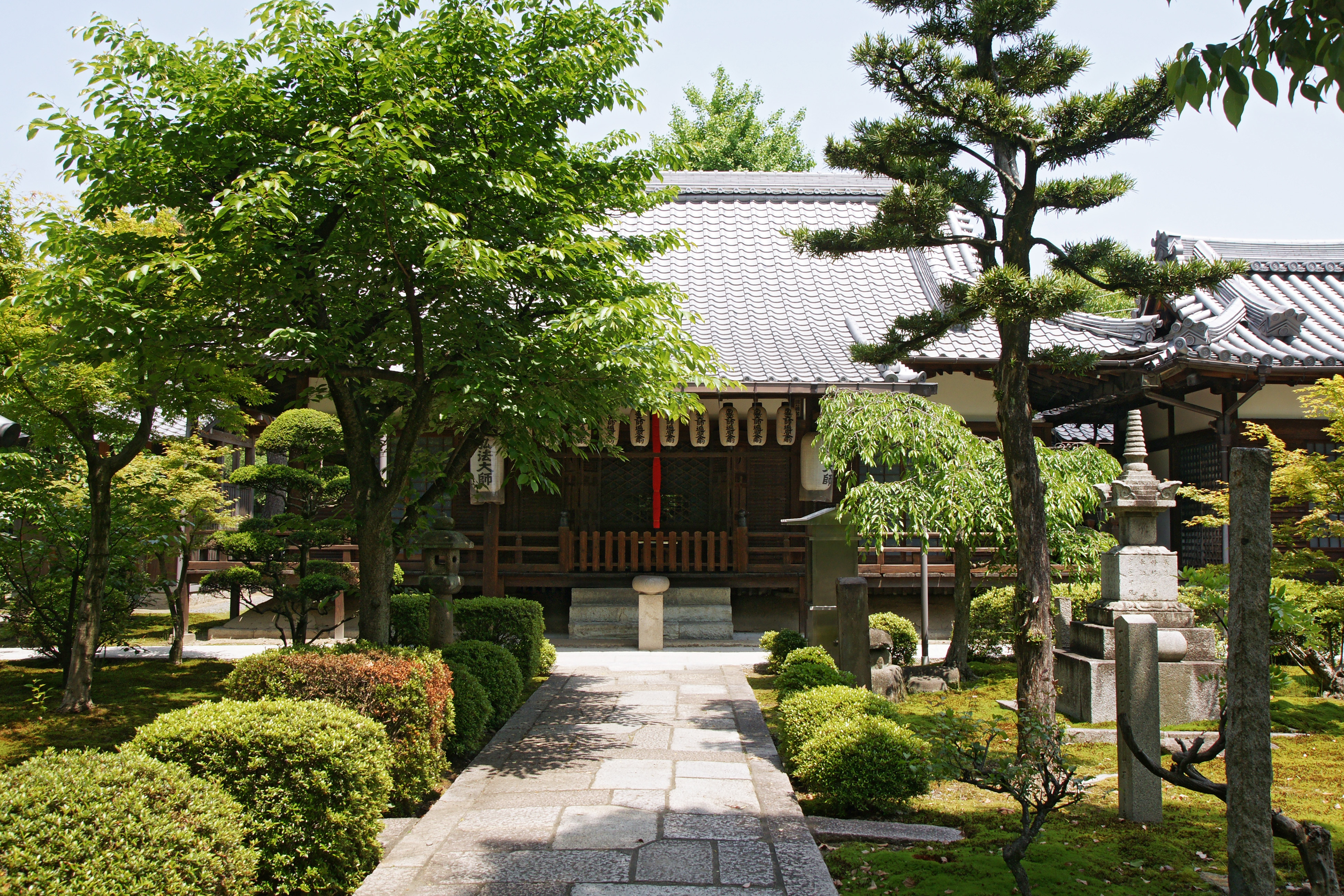
- Anrakuju-in Daishi-do

- Anrakuju-in Anrakuju-in (Japan)

Religion
- Affiliation: Buddhist
- Deity: Amida Nyorai
- Rite: Anrakuju-in

Location
- Location: 74 Nakauchihatacho, Takeda, Fushimi-ku, Kyoto-shi, Kyoto-fu
- Country: Japan
- Interactive map of Anrakuju-in
- Coordinates: 34°57′9″N 135°45′17.5″E

Architecture
- Founder: Emperor Toba
- Completed: 1137
- National Historic Site of Japan

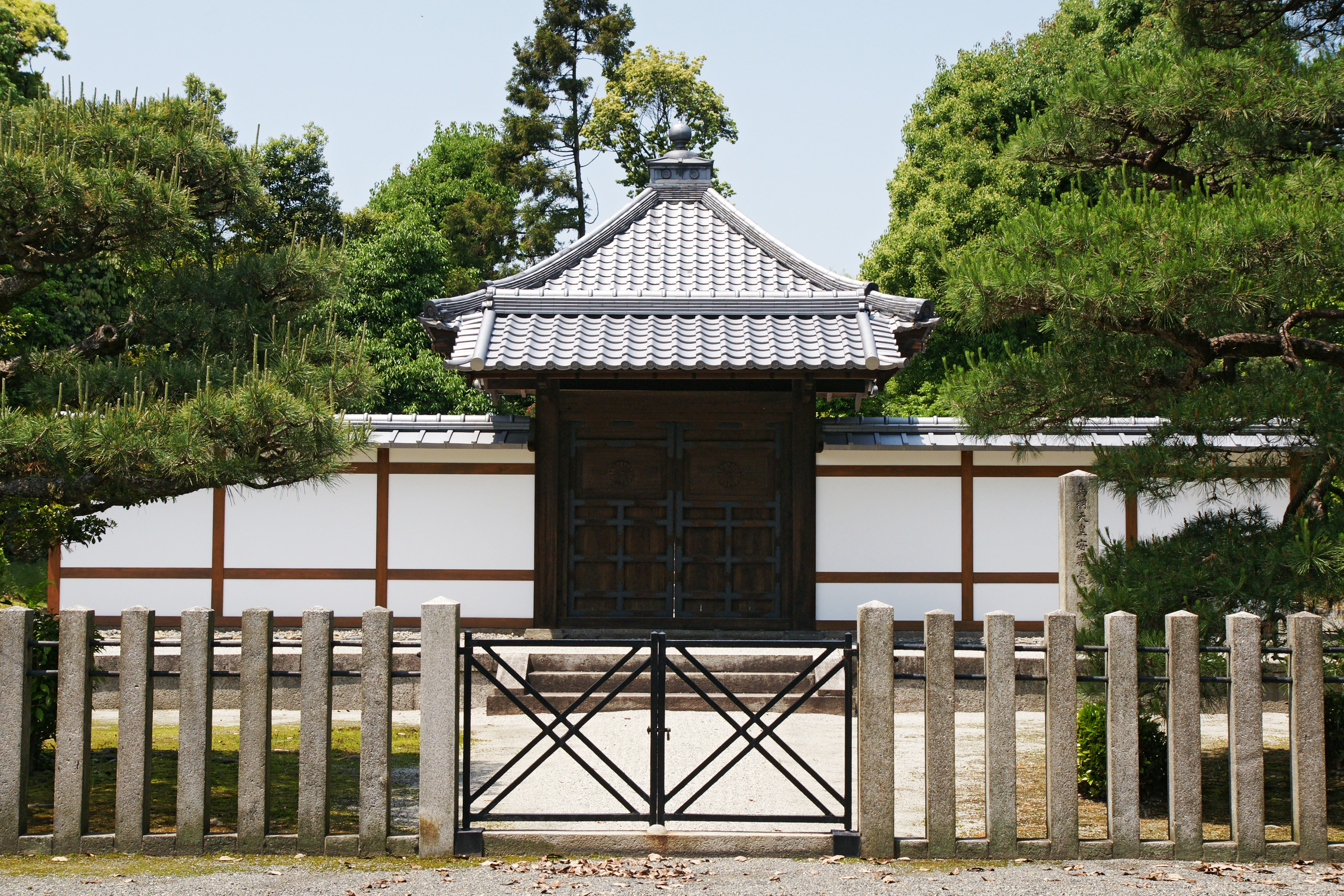
Grave of Emperor Toba

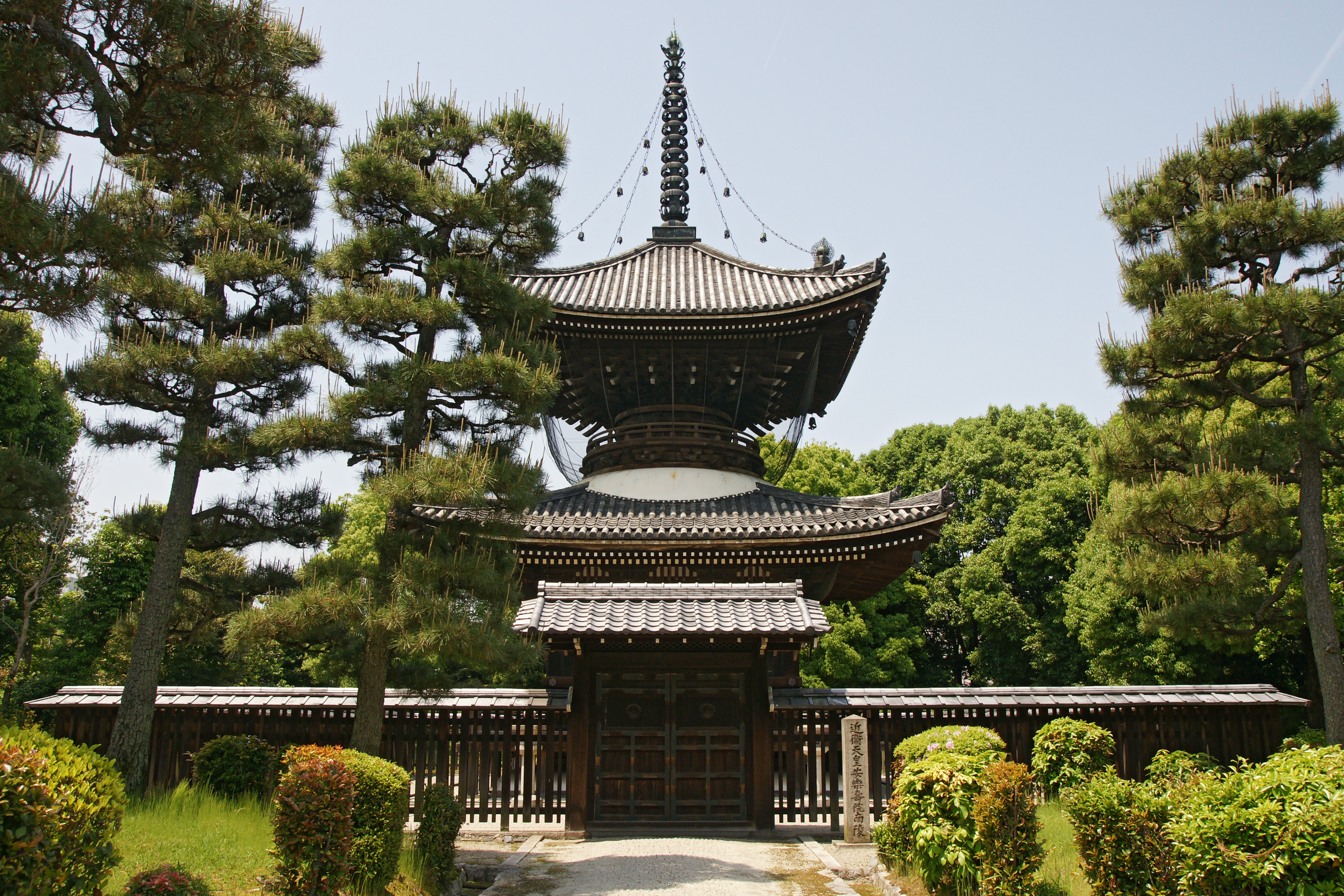
Grave of Emperor Konoe

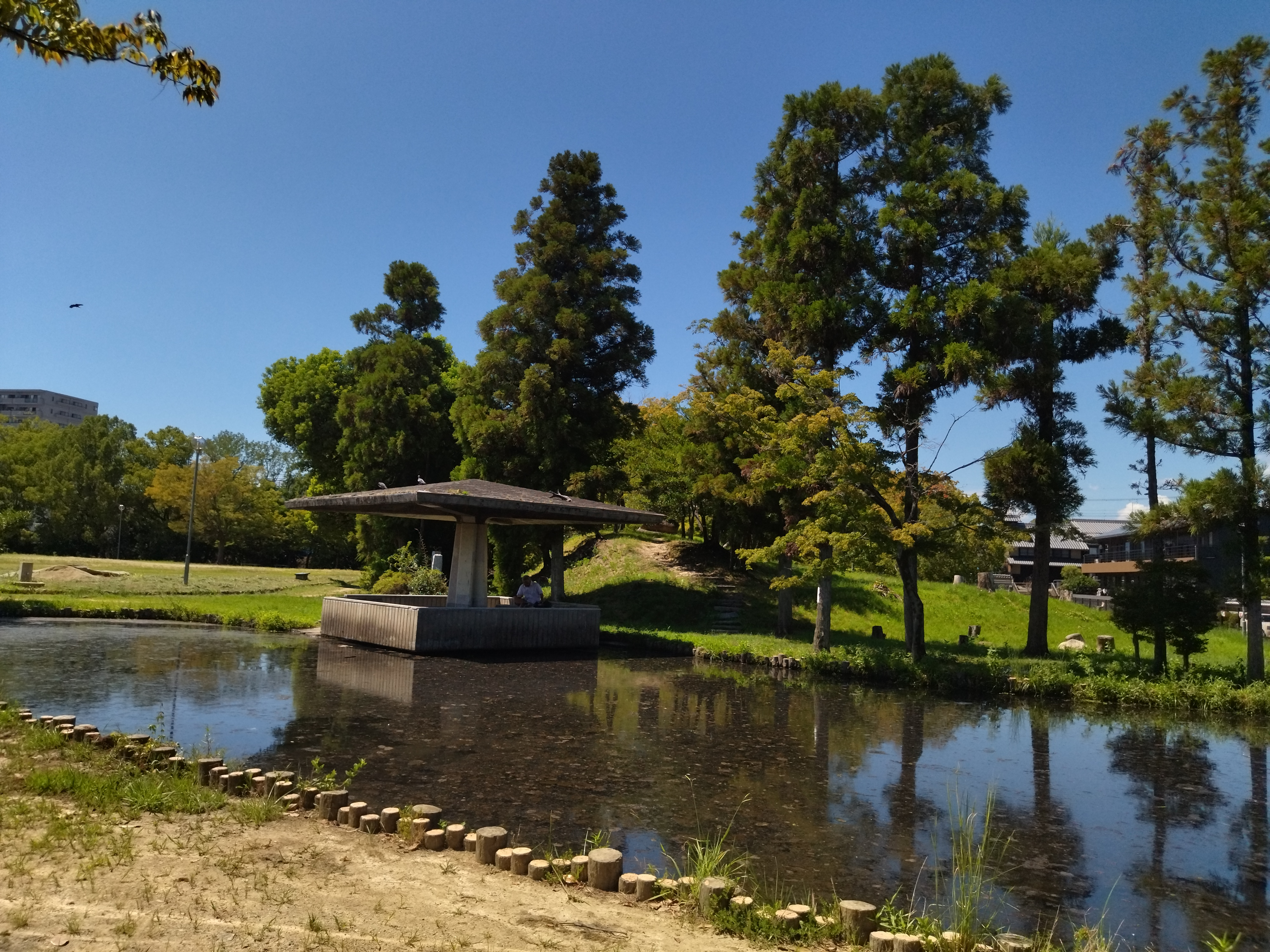
Site of the Toba Imperial Villa

Anrakuju-in (安楽寿院) is a Buddhist temple located in the Takeda neighborhood of Fushimi, Kyoto, Japan. The temple is associated with the Imperial family of Japan, originating from a Buddhist chapel built in the eastern palace of the Toba Imperial Villa (鳥羽離宮, Toba rikyu) in 1137. The temple houses a number of Important Cultural Properties and the tombs of Emperor Toba and Emperor Konoe are on the grounds. The temple belongs to the Shingon sect, and its honzon is a statue of Amida Nyorai. The temple precincts are protected as a National Historic Site as the "Toba Imperial Villa" site.

== Overview ==
The Toba Imperial Villa was located in the Kamitoba neighborhood in Minami-ku, Kyoto, and the Shimotoba, Takeda, and Nakajima neighborhoods in the adjacent Fushimi-ku, Kyoto, or approximately three kilometers south of the original border of Heian-kyō, at the confluence of the Kamo River and the Katsura River. This area was called "Toba" and was a key transportation hub, as it was on the San'yōdō highway to western Japan and served as the port for Heian-kyō, to which it was connected by an extension of the Suzaku-ōji road, the "Main Street" of the ancient capital. It was also famous as a scenic place where aristocrats hunted and built summer villas. The Toba Imperial Villa is estimated to be about 1.7 kilometers east-to-west and 1.1 kilometers north-to-south, but it is unclear because the western edge is the current course of the Kamo River.

The Toba Imperial Villa was the stage for the cloistered government in the late Heian period (11th to 12th centuries). In the 11th century, Fujiwara no Suetsuna, presented his villa at Toba to the cloistered Emperor Shirakawa. The retired emperor carried out large-scale expansion work. This is what would become Nanden, which was completed in 1087. After that, the Kitaden Palace, Izumi Palace, Baba Palace, Higashiden Palace, and Tanaka Palace were built in succession. Buddhist temples were built in each palace by the retired Emperor Shirakawa and Emperor Toba. The Buddhist temple attached to the Nanden Palace, which was built first, was called Shōkongō-in, followed by Shōkomyō-in in the Kitaden Palace, Jōbōdō-in in the Izumi Palace, Anrakuju-in in the Higashiden Palace, and Kongōshin-in in the Tanakaden Palace.

During the reign of Emperor Toba in the 12th century, the Toba Imperial Villa was expanded several times, starting with the Izumi Palace. The construction work was shared among the Emperor's close retainers, who were appointed to oversee the various sections. Emperor Toba ordered the construction of two three-story pagodas at Anrakuju-in, and designated the main pagoda as his own tomb. The other pagoda was intended as the tomb of Bifukumon'in, but after the death of the retired emperor, Bifukumon'in left a will to have her remains interred at Mount Kōya, and so her remains were not interred there. In 1163, Emperor Nijō ordered that the remains of Emperor Konoe, which had been kept at Chisoku-in, in Nara be reburied at Anrakuju-in. At the time, Emperor Go-Shirakawa and Emperor Nijō were fighting over the position of Chiten-no-kimi, and it is speculated that Emperor Nijō carried out this reburial in order to emphasize that he was not the biological son of Emperor Go-Shirakawa, but the adopted son of Bifukumon'in and the brother-in-law of Emperor Konoe. After Emperor Nijō suddenly died, Emperor Go-Shirakawa secured the position of Chiten, but disliked and avoided the Toba Imperial Villa. However, ironically, it was in Toba Imperial Villa that Taira no Kiyomori imprisoned Emperor Go-Shirakawa when he ended his cloistered rule in his coup of 1179. The Toba Imperial Villa was considered a private space for the retired emperor, and although political meetings were held there in the latter years of Emperor Toba's life, most political decisions were made at the Kyoto Imperial Palace.

Records show that Anrakuju-in also had other buildings such as a Nine Amida Hall, which would have been similar to the temple of Jōruri-ji in Kizugawa. The nine Amida Buddha statues enshrined there were made by the Buddhist sculptor Chōen to pray for the recovery of Emperor Toba from illness.

Anrakuju-in received a large number of shōen landed estates all over Japan, and at its peak it had as many as 63 shōen in 32 provinces. The Ashikaga estate from which the Ashikaga clan derived its name once belonged to Anrakuju-in. These estates later became the economic base of the Daikakuji line of the Imperial family.

Anrakuju-in was subsequently destroyed by fire in 1296 and 1548, and also suffered damage in the 1596 Keichō–Fushimi earthquake, resulting in the loss of the original Main Hall and the two three-story pagodas (the main pagoda and the new pagoda), which were the tombs of Emperor Toba and Emperor Konoe. Toyotomi Hideyoshi granted the temple estates of 500 koku for its upkeep. After a temporary hall was built in 1612, the main pagoda was rebuilt in 1864 at the end of the Edo period, but as a Buddhist hall with a tiled roof. This building still exists to the west of Anrakuju-in, and is under the management of the Imperial Household Agency as the Anrakujuin Mausoleum of Emperor Toba. Meanwhile, the new pagoda was rebuilt in the style of a pagoda by Toyotomi Hideyori under the magistrate Katagiri Katsumoto in 1606, and still exists to the south of the temple, and is also under the management of the Imperial Household Agency as the Anrakujuin Southern Mausoleum of Emperor Konoe. It is a rare example of a pagoda being used for an emperor's tomb. The bell tower was also rebuilt by Hideyori in the same year.

In the Bakumatsu period, the temple was the headquarters for imperial forces in the Battle of Toba-Fushimi.

== Important Cultural Properties ==
- painting on silk of Amida descending with twenty-five bosatsu (絹本著色阿弥陀二十五菩薩来迎図) (Heian period)
- painting on silk of Fugen Bosatsu (絹本著色普賢菩薩像) (Heian period)
- seated wooden statue of Amida Nyorai (木造阿弥陀如来坐像) (Heian period)
- inscribed gorintō (五輪塔) (1287)

== See also ==
- List of Historic Sites of Japan (Nara)
- Insei system
- Daijō Tennō
- Sennyū-ji
