= Tennin (era) =

Period of Japanese history (1108–1110 CE)

Tennin (天仁) was a Japanese era name (年号, nengō; "year name") after Kajō and before Ten'ei. This period spanned the years from August 1108 through July 1110. The reigning emperor was Toba-tennō (鳥羽天皇).

== Change of Era ==
- February 14, 1108 Tennin gannen (天仁元年): The new era name was created to mark an event or series of events. The previous era ended and the new one commenced in Kajō 3, on the 3rd day of the 8th month of 1108.

== Events of the Tennin Era ==
- 1108 (Tennin 1): Minamoto no Tameyoshi, grandson and heir of Minamoto no Yoshiie, became clan leader of the Seiwa Genji after the death of his grandfather.
- 1108 (Tennin 1): Mount Asama erupts, causing widespread damage.
- 1109 (Tennin 2, in the 1st month): The emperor visited Iwashimizu Shrine and the Kamo Shrines.

== Notes ==
Preceded by Kajō	Era or nengō Tennin; 1108–1110	Succeeded by Ten'ei
