= Hōan =

Period of Japanese history (1120–1124 CE)

Hōan (保安) was a Japanese era name (年号, nengō; lit. "year name") after Gen'ei and before Tenji. This period spanned the years from April 1120 through April 1124. The reigning emperors were Toba-tennō (鳥羽天皇) and Sutoku-tennō (崇徳天皇).

== Change of era ==
- February 1, 1120 Hōan gannen (保安元年): The new era name was created to mark an event or series of events. The previous era ended and the new one commenced in Gen'ei 3, on the 10th day of the 4th month of 1120.

== Events of the Hōan era ==
- 1121 (Hōan 2, 5th month): The priests of Mount Hiei set fire to Mii-dera.
- February 25, 1123 (Hōan 4, on the 28th day of the 1st month): In the 17th year of Emperor Toba's reign (鳥羽天皇17年), Toba was forced to abdicate by his father, retired-Emperor Shirakawa. Toba gave up the throne in favor of his son Akihito, who would become Emperor Sutoku. Toba was only 21 years old when he renounced his title; and he had already reigned for 16 years: two in the nengō Tennin, three in Ten'ei, five in the nengō Eikyū, two in Gen'ei, and four in the nengō Hōan. At this time, Toba took the title Daijō-tennō. The succession (senso) was received by his son.
- 1123 (Hōan 4, 2nd month): Emperor Sutoku is said to have acceded to the throne (sokui).

== Notes ==
Preceded by Gen'ei	Era or nengō Hōan; 1120–1124	Succeeded by Tenji
