= Kasuga-zukuri =

Shinto architectural style

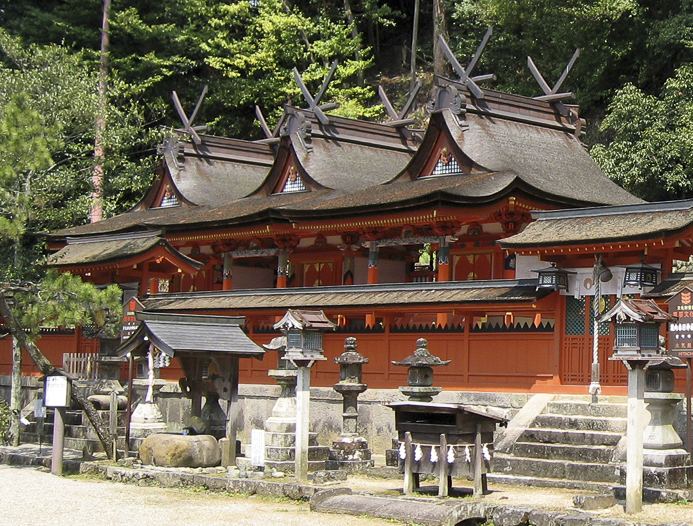
The honden at Uda Mikumari Shrine Kami-gū is made of three joined Kasuga-zukuri buildings.

Kasuga-zukuri (春日造) is a traditional Shinto shrine architectural style which takes its name from Kasuga Taisha's honden.

== Description ==
It is characterized by the use of a building just 1x1 ken in size with the entrance on the gabled end covered by a veranda. In Kasuga Taisha's case, the honden is just 1.9 m x 2.6 m.

Supporting structures are painted vermilion, while the plank walls are white. It has a tsumairi (also called tsumairi-zukuri) (妻入・妻入造) structure, that is, the building has its main entrance on the gabled side.

The roof is gabled (kirizuma yane (切妻屋根, gabled roof)), decorated with purely ornamental poles called chigi (vertical) or katsuogi (horizontal), and covered with cypress bark.

After the nagare-zukuri style, this is the most common Shinto shrine style. While the first is common all over Japan, however, shrines with a kasuga-zukuri honden are found mostly in the Kansai region around Nara. If a diagonal rafter (a sumigi (隅木)) is added to support the portico, the style is called sumigi-iri kasugazukuri (隅木入春日造).

== Kasuga-zukuri and nagare-zukuri ==
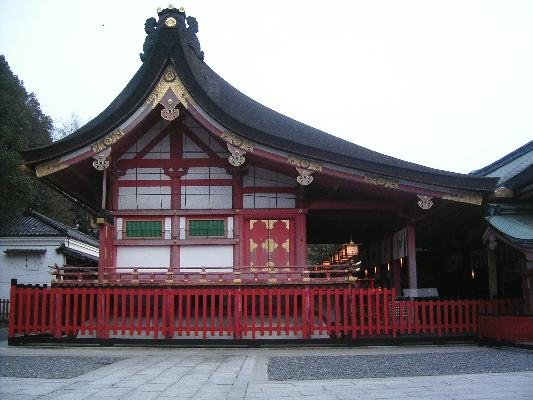
Fushimi Inari Taisha's honden

While superficially completely different, the kasuga-zukuri actually shares an ancestry with the most popular style in Japan, the nagare-zukuri.

The two for example share pillars set over a double-cross-shaped foundation and a roof which extends over the main entrance, covering a veranda. (The kasuga-zukuri is the only tsumairi style to possess this last feature.) The foundation's configuration is typical not of permanent, but of temporary shrines, built to be periodically moved. This shows that, for example, both the nagare-zukuri Kamo Shrine and Kasuga Taisha used to be dedicated to a mountain cult, and that they had to be moved to follow the movements of the kami.

The styles also both have a veranda in front of the main entrance, a detail which makes it likely they both evolved from a simple gabled roof.

== Gallery ==
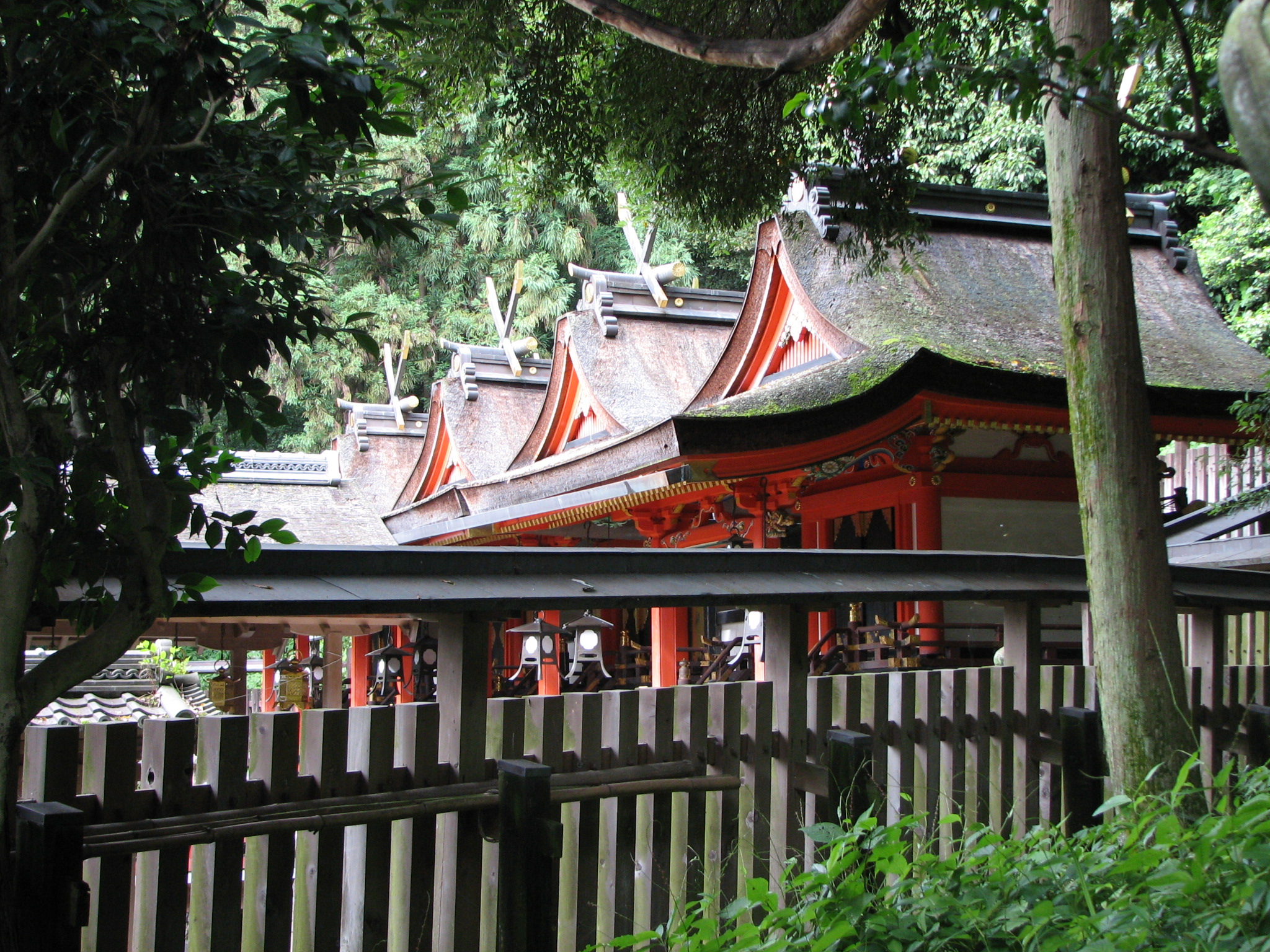
Hiraoka Shrine's honden

== See also ==
- Glossary of Shinto
