= Ōharano Shrine =

Shinto shrine in Kyoto, Japan

Ōharano Shrine (大原野神社, Ōharano jinja)
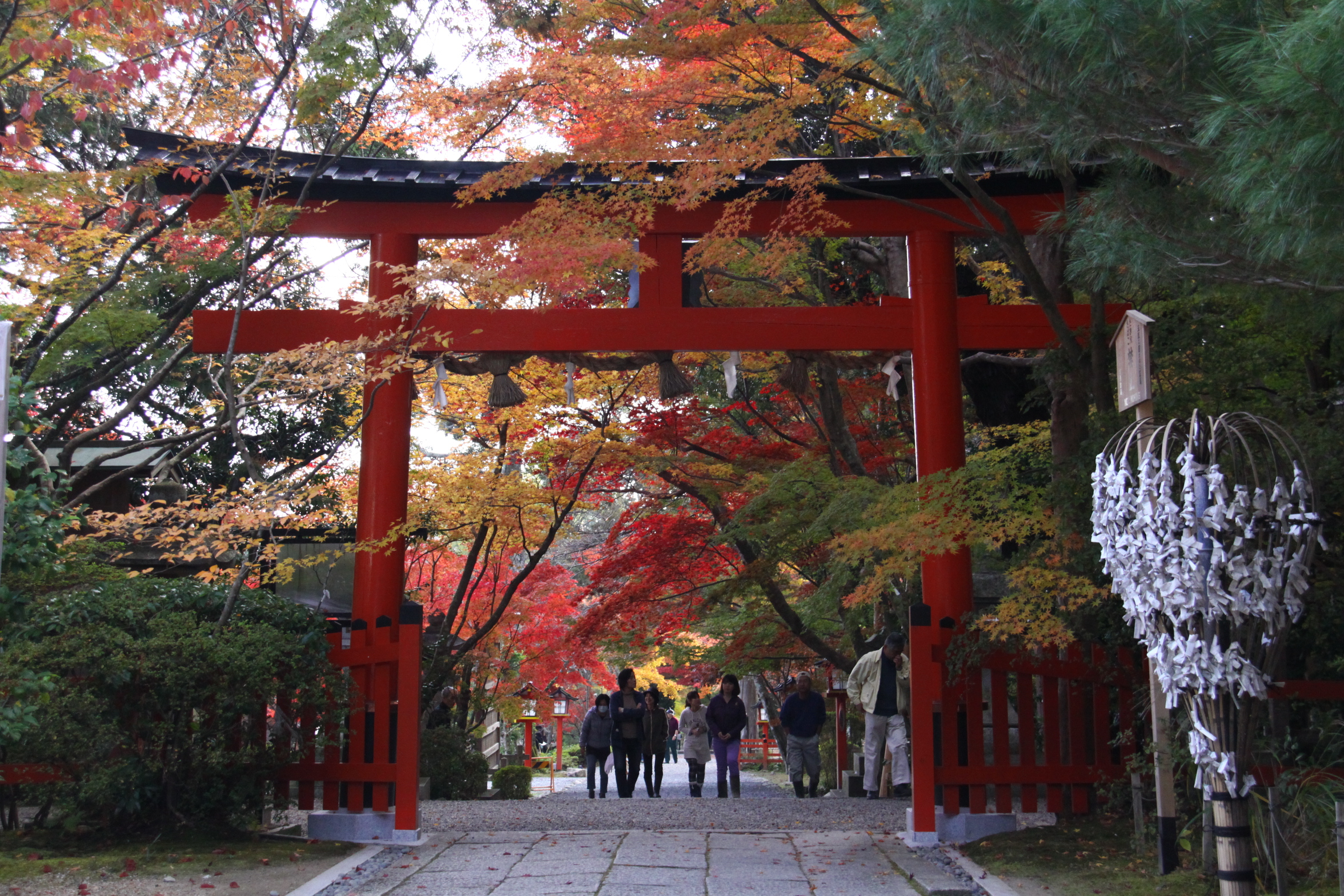
- 3rd Torii

- Location within Japan

Religion
- Affiliation: Shinto
- Deity: Takemikazuchi Futsunushi Ame-no-Koyane Himegami
- Year consecrated: 786

Location
- Interactive map of Ōharano Shrine (大原野神社, Ōharano jinja)
- Coordinates: 34°57′37″N 135°39′22″E

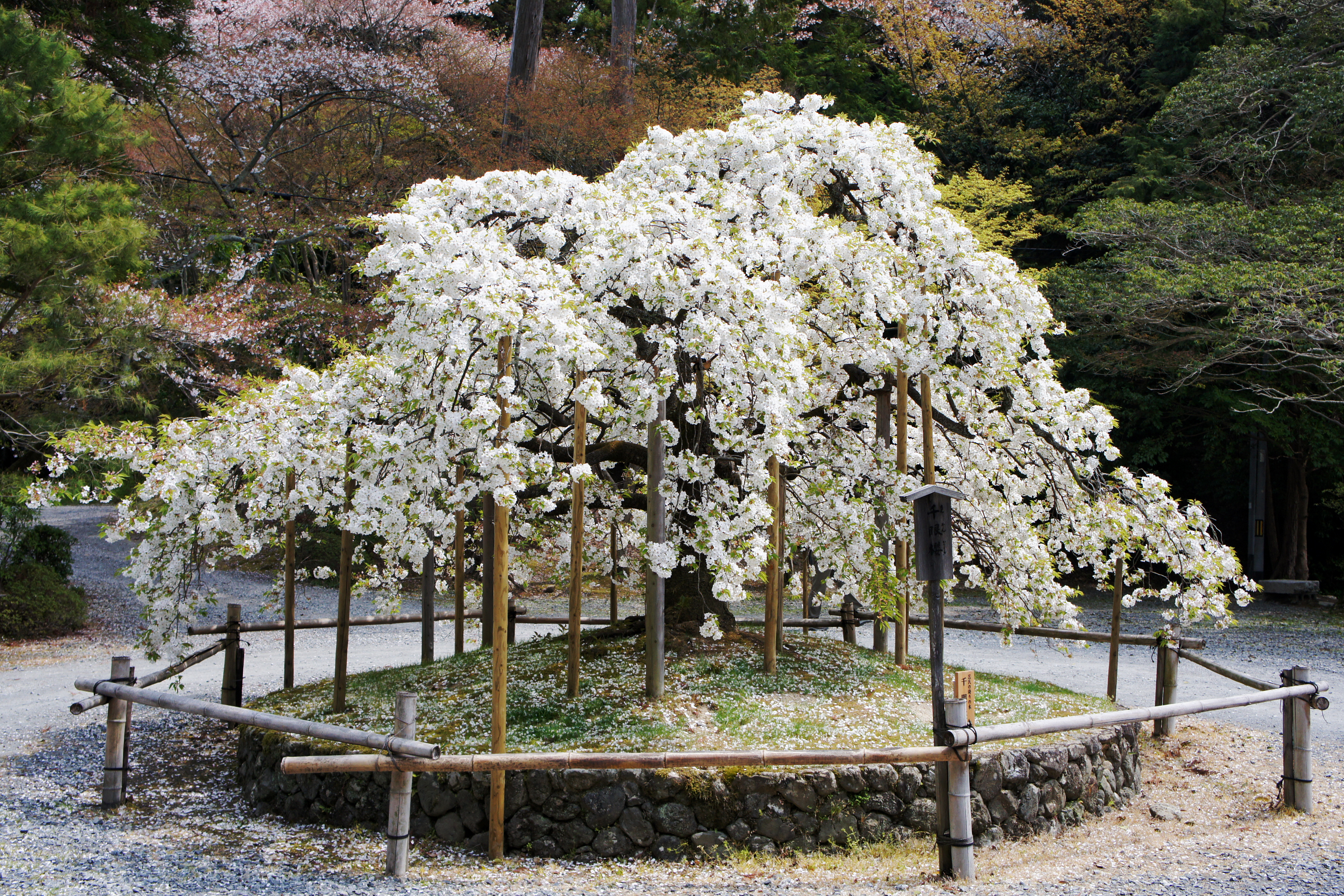
Sengan-zakura

Ōharano Shrine (大原野神社, Ōharano jinja) is a Shinto shrine located in Nishikyō-ku, Kyoto Prefecture, Japan.

Ōharano is dedicated to the Fujiwara tutelary kami, Ame-no-Koyane, who was said to have assisted in the founding of the state.

== History ==
The shrine became the object of Imperial patronage during the early Heian period. In 965, Emperor Murakami ordered that Imperial messengers were sent to report important events to the guardian kami of Japan. These heihaku were initially presented to 16 shrines including the Ōharano Shrine.

From 1871 through 1946, the Ōhorano Shrine was officially designated one of the Kanpei-chūsha (官幣中社), meaning that it stood in the second rank of government supported shrines.

== See also ==
- List of Shinto shrines
- Twenty-Two Shrines
- Modern system of ranked Shinto Shrines
