= Chōshō =

Period of Japanese history (1132–1135 CE)

Chōshō (長承) was a Japanese era name (年号, nengō; lit. "year name") after Tenshō and before Hōen. This period spanned the years from August 1132 through November 1135. The reigning emperor was Sutoku-tennō (崇徳天皇).

== Change of Era ==
- January 20, 1132 Chōshō gannen (長承元年): The new era name was created to mark an event or series of events. The previous era ended and the new one commenced in Tenshō 2, on the 11th day of the 8th month of 1132.

== Events of the Chōshō Era ==
- 1132 (Chōshō 1, 1st month): Fujiwara no Tadasane received a sign of the emperor's favor.
- 1132 (Chōshō 1, 3rd month): The former-Emperor Toba decided to build himself a palace; and Taira-no Tadamori was placed in charge of its construction. When the project was completed, Tadamori was rewarded by being named governor of the island of Tsushima. Tadamori was a descendant of Emperor Kanmu.
- 1132 (Chōshō 1, 3rd month): Emperor Sutoku made a pilgrimage to Mount Kōya.
- August 1, 1133 (Chōshō 2, 29th day of the 6th month): Former-Emperor Toba had Fujiwara no Kanezane's daughter (the future Kaya-no In, 1095–1155) brought to his palace as his consort.
- 1133 (Chōshō 3, 19th day of the 3rd month): Kanezane's daughter—Toba's consort—is advanced to the position of empress, but she bore no Imperial sons.
- 1134 (Chōshō 3, 3rd month): The Emperor visited the Kasuga Shrine.
- 1134 (Chōshō 3, 3rd month): Sutoku visited the Hiyoshi Taisha.
- 1134 (Chōshō 3, 5th month): The Emperor visited the Iwashimizu Shrine.
- 1134 (Chōshō 3, 5th month): Sutoku visited the Kamo Shrines.

This era was known as a time of famine.

== Notes ==
Preceded by Tenshō	Era or nengō Chōshō; 1132–1135	Succeeded by Hōen
