= Daiji (era) =

Period of Japanese history (1126-1131 AD)

Daiji (大治) was a Japanese era name (年号, nengō; lit. "year name") after Tenji and before Tenshō. This period spanned the years from January 1126 through January 1131. The reigning emperor was Sutoku-tennō (崇徳天皇).

== Change of era ==
- January 25, 1126 Daiji gannen (大治元年): The new era name was created to mark an event or series of events. The previous era ended and the new one commenced in Tenji 3, on the 22nd day of the 1st month of 1126.

== Events of the Daiji era ==
- 1128 (Daiji 3, in the 3rd month): Taiken-mon In ordered the construction of Enshō-ji in fulfillment of a sacred vow. This was one in a series of "sacred vow temples" (gogan-ji) built by imperial command following a precedent established by Emperor Shirakawa, who established and developed the Hosshō-ji complex.
- 1128 (Daiji 3, 6th month): Fujiwara Tadamichi is relieved of his responsibilities and duties as sesshō (regent); and simultaneously, Tadamichi is named kampaku.
- July 24, 1129 (Daiji 4, 7th day of the 7th month): The former-Emperor Shirakawa died at the age of 77.

== Notes ==
Preceded by Tenji	Era or nengō Daiji; 1126–1131	Succeeded by Tenshō
