= Tenshō (Heian period) =

Japanese era name of the Heian period, 1131–1132

Tenshō (天承) was a Japanese era name (年号, nengō; lit. "year name") after Daiji and before Chōshō. This period spanned the years from 1131 through 1132. The reigning emperor was Sutoku-tennō (崇徳天皇).

== Change of Era ==
- January 31, 1131 Tenshō gannen (天承元年): The new era name was created to mark an event or series of events. The previous era ended and the new one commenced in Daiji 6, on the 29th day of the 1st month of 1131.

== Events of the Tenshō Era ==
- 1131 (Tenshō 1, 12th month): The udaijin Fujiwara Yetada was elevated to sadaijin; and the naidaijin Arihito filled that vacancy by becoming udaijin. The dainagon Fujiwara no Munetada was made nadaijin.

== Notes ==
Preceded by Daiji	Era or nengō Tenshō; 1131–1132	Succeeded by Chōshō
