= Himegami =

Japanese goddess

Himegami (比売神) is a general term for female deity (kami) in Shinto whose individual identity may be known or who may be known simply as the wife, daughter, or other important relation to a male kami enshrined in the same shrine.
