= Eiji =

- Gender: Male

Origin
- Origin: Japanese
- Meaning: Different meanings depending on the kanji used

Other names
- Variant form: 英司
- Related names: Eiichi

Eiji is a common masculine Japanese given name.

== Written forms ==
Eiji can be written using different kanji characters and can mean:

- 栄治, "prosperity, peace"
- 英治, "great, peace"
- 英二, "great, second"
- 永次, "eternity, next"

The name can also be written in hiragana (えいじ) or katakana (エイジ).

In Japanese history the Eiji era (永治, "eternal peace"), from 1141 to 1142, follows the Hōen era and precedes the Kōji era.

== People with the name ==
- Eiji Akaso (赤楚 衛二; born 1994), Japanese actor
- Eiji Ando (安藤 英二; born 1982), Japanese former rugby union player
- Eiji Aonuma (青沼 英二; born 1963), Japanese designer and video game director
- Eiji Bandō (板東 英二; born 1940), Japanese television entertainer, former baseball player and YouTuber
- Eiji Ezaki (江崎 英治; 1968–2016), Japanese professional wrestler
- Eiji Funakoshi (船越 英二; 1923–2007), Japanese film actor
- Eiji Gaya (賀谷 英司; born 1969), Japanese former football player
- Eiji Gotō (後藤 英次; 1887–1967), Japanese admiral in the Imperial Japanese Navy
- Eiji Gō (郷 鍈治; 1937–1992), Japanese actor
- Eiji Hamano (浜野 栄次; 1923–1992), Japanese photographer
- Eiji Hashimoto (1931–2021), Japanese harpsichordist, orchestra conductor and classical music professor
- Eiji Hirata (平田 英治; born 1966), Japanese former football player
- Eiji Hirotsu (弘津 英司; born 1967), Japanese former rugby union player
- Eiji Hosoya (細谷 英二; 1945–2012), Japanese businessman
- Eiji Iijima (飯島 栄治; born 1979), Japanese shogi player
- Eiji Ikeda (池田 永治; 1889–1950), Japanese cartoonist, painter, illustrator, and haiga artist
- Eiji Ina (伊奈 英次; born 1957), Japanese photographer
- Eiji Iwamoto (岩本 英嗣; born 1980), Japanese former competitive figure skater
- Eiji Kanamori (金森 栄治; born 1957), Japanese former Nippon Professional Baseball outfielder
- Eiji Kanie (蟹江 栄司; 1941–1985), Japanese actor and voice actor
- Eiji Kawashima (川島 永嗣; born 1983), Japanese football goalkeeper
- Eiji Kidoguchi (木戸口 英司; born 1963), Japanese politician
- Eiji Kikuchi (菊池 栄二; born 1967), Japanese video game director
- Eiji Kimizuka (君塚 栄治; 1952–2015), Japanese Chief of Staff of the Japan Ground Self-Defense Force
- Eiji Kitamura (北村 英治; born 1929), Japanese jazz clarinetist and tenor saxophonist
- Eiji Kiyokawa (清川 栄治; 1961–2024), Japanese Nippon Professional Baseball player and coach
- Eiji Kurita (born 1938), Japanese cross-country skier
- Eiji Kutsuki (朽木 英次; born 1962), Japanese former rugby union player and coach
- Eiji Maruo (丸尾 英司; born 1976), Japanese former professional baseball pitcher
- Eiji Mikage (御影 瑛路; born 1983), Japanese novelist
- Eiji Mikawa (美川 英二; 1933–1999), Japanese businessperson and rugby player
- Eiji Misawa (三澤 英司; born 1973), Japanese ice sledge hockey player
- Eiji Mitooka (水戸岡 鋭治; born 1947), Japanese industrial designer
- Eiji Mitsuoka (光岡 映二; born 1976), Japanese professional mixed martial artist
- Eiji Miyamoto (宮本 英治; born 1998), Japanese footballer
- Eiji Miyashita (宮下 栄治; born 1978), Japanese voice actor
- Eiji Mizoguchi (溝口 英二; born 1964), Japanese professional golfer
- Eiji Mizuguchi (水口 栄二; born 1969), Japanese former Nippon Professional Baseball infielder
- Eiji Mizuno (水野 英二; born 1990), Japanese mixed martial artist
- Eiji Morioka (森岡 栄治; 1946–2004), Japanese boxer
- Eiji Moriyama (森山 栄治; born 1976), Japanese stage actor and voice actor
- Eiji Nakano (中野 英治; 1904–1990), Japanese film actor
- Eiji Nonaka (野中 英次; born 1965), Japanese manga artist and humorist
- Eiji Ochiai (落合 英二; born 1969), Japanese former Nippon Professional Baseball pitcher
- Eiji Oguma (小熊 英二; born 1962), Japanese historical sociologist, professor, documentary filmmaker and guitarist
- Eiji Okada (岡田 英次; 1920–1995), Japanese film actor
- Eiji Oki (大木 英司; born 1969)
- Eiji Okuda (奥田 瑛二; born 1950), Japanese actor and film director
- Eiji Osawa (大澤 映二; born 1935), Japanese former professor of computational chemistry
- Eiji Oue (大植 英次; born 1956), Japanese conductor
- Eiji Ōtsuka (大塚 英志; bonr 1958), Japanese social critic, folklorist, media theorist, and novelist
- Eiji Sasaki (佐々木 英治; 1915–2007), Japanese businessman
- Eiji Sato (佐藤 英二; born 1971), Japanese former football player and manager
- Eiji Sawamura (沢村 栄治; 1917–1944), Japanese professional baseball player
- Eiji Shigeta (重田 榮治; 1877–1958), Japanese soldier and a businessman
- Eiji Shimomura (下村 英士; born 1959), Japanese volleyball player
- Eiji Shirai (白井 永地; born 1995), Japanese footballer
- Eiji Shotsu (正津 英志; born 1972), Japanese professional Nippon Professional Baseball player
- Eiji Suganuma (菅沼 栄治; born 1964), Japanese animator, director and character designer
- Eiji Sumi (隅 英二; born 1970), Japanese artist
- Eiji Takemoto (竹本 英史; born 1973), Japanese voice actor
- Eiji Takeuchi (栄治 竹内; born 1959), Japanese tennis player
- Eiji Takigawa (滝川 英治; born 1979), Japanese former actor
- Eiji Tomii (富井 英司; born 1987), Japanese footballer
- Eiji Toyoda (豊田 英二; 1913–2013), Japanese chairman of Toyota Motor Corporation
- Eiji Tsuburaya (円谷 英二; 1901–1970), Japanese special effects director
- Eiji Ueda (上田 栄治; born 1953), Japanese former football player and manager
- Eiji Uehiro (上廣 榮治; 1937–2019), Japanese ethicist, social educator, and writer
- Eiji Uematsu (born 1949), Japanese artist
- Eiji Usatsuka (兎塚 エイジ), Japanese light novel illustrator
- Eiji Wentz (ウエンツ 瑛士; born 1985), Japanese singer and entertainer
- Eiji Yanagisawa (柳沢 栄治; 1967–2024), Japanese voice actor
- Eiji Yoshikawa (吉川 英治; 1892–1962), Japanese historical novelist
- Eiji Yoshikawa (boxer), Japanese boxer, coach, author, documentarian and peace educator

== Fictional characters ==
- Eiji Asuma (明日真 映児), a character in the manga series Psychometrer Eiji
- Eiji Date (伊達 英二), a character in the manga and anime series Hajime no Ippo
- Eiji Hino (火野 映司), a character in the tokusatsu television series Kamen Rider OOO
- Eiji Kamiya (神谷 エイジ), a character in the manga and anime series Wangan Midnight
- Eiji Kanda (神田 えいじ), a character in the manga and anime series Antique Bakery
- Eiji Kashii (樫井 栄児), a character in the light novel and anime series Juni Taisen: Zodiac War
- Eiji Kikumaru (菊丸 英二), a character in the manga and anime series The Prince of Tennis
- Eiji Kisaragi (如月 影二), a character in the video game series Art of Fighting and The King of Fighters
- Eiji Niizuma (新妻 エイジ), a character in the manga and anime series Bakuman
- Eiji Sawakita (沢北 栄治), a character in the manga and anime series Slam Dunk
- Eiji Nochizawa (後沢 鋭二), a character in the anime film Sword Art Online The Movie: Ordinal Scale
- Eiji Okumura (奥村 英二), a character in the manga and anime series Banana Fish
- Eiji Ōtori (鳳 英二), a character in the multimedia franchise Uta no Prince-sama
- Eiji Takaoka (高丘 映士), a character in the tokusatsu television series GoGo Sentai Boukenger
- Eiji Yagami (八神 英二), a character in the game and anime series Little Battlers Experience
