= Kusuko Incident =

The Kusuko Incident (薬子の変, Kusuko no Hen), also known as the Retired Emperor Heizei Incident (平城太上天皇の変, Heizei-Daijō-tennō no Hen), occurred in the early Heian period. In 810, Emperor Saga and ex-Emperor Heizei stood in opposition, but Saga's side quickly raised enough troops to resolve the confrontation, making Heizei become a monk. Heizei's lover the Naishi-no-kami (内侍) Fujiwara no Kusuko and her older brother the sangi Fujiwara no Nakanari were punished for the incident.

The incident was originally viewed as having been precipitated by Kusuko herself, and thus was called the "Kusuko Incident". In recent years, the view that the incident was caused by the division of power between the emperor of Japan and retired emperor under the Ritsuryō system has taken root. Since 2003, some Japanese high school textbooks have begun to refer to the incident as the "Retired Emperor Heizei Incident".

== Background ==
When Emperor Kanmu died in 806, his son Crown Prince Ate took the throne as Emperor Heizei. Heizei in turn appointed his younger brother Prince Kamino as crown prince. This decision is thought to have been influenced by Kanmu's opinion, and the fact that Heizei was sickly and his children were still young. Even so, an internal succession dispute in the court could not be avoided. The new emperor's younger brother by another mother, Prince Iyo, was accused the next year of plotting a coup, and ultimately committed suicide.

In 809, Heizei fell ill, and fearing that the sickness was a curse by the vengeful spirits of Prince Sawara and Prince Iyo, chose to abdicate the throne to prevent calamity. The Naishi-no-Kami (尚侍) Fujiwara no Kusuko and her older brother, the sangi Fujiwara no Nakanari, strongly opposed this decision, but the Emperor did not back down, and ten days later his brother Crown Prince Kamino took the throne as Emperor Saga. Saga chose Heizei's third son Prince Takaoka as crown prince.

Early the next year, Emperor Heizei moved to the old capital at Heijō-kyō and recovered from his illness. Angered by Saga's attempt to change the kansatsu-shi (観察使) regional inspection system he had established, the retired emperor set up a competing court. Kusuko and Nakanari, plotting Heizei's complete restoration to the throne, encouraged the opposition between the two. Moreover, Kusuko's position as Naishi-no-Kami gave her control over the issuance of naishi-sen (内侍宣), a means of transmittance for imperial orders to the Daijō-kan. At the time, retired emperors were able to involve themselves in politics in the same way as the current sovereign, as ex-Empress Kōken did during the reign of Emperor Junnin, and so Heizei was able to command the Daijō-kan via Kusuko's office.

Within a few months of this situation, Saga established the Kurōdo-dokoro to regain control of the issuance of imperial decrees, and three months later abolished the kansatsu-shi and reinstituted the office sangi. This further incited Heizei's opposition.

== Incident ==
In the autumn of 810, amid the deepening rivalry between the two courts, Heizei issued an order to abandon Heian-kyō and move the capital back to Heijō-kyō. This came as an unexpected move to Saga, who played along for the moment by appointing Sakanoue no Tamuramaro, Fujiwara no Fuyutsugu, and Ki no Taue (紀田上) in charge of construction there. By sending these trusted attendants to Heizei's base of operations, he may have hoped to check his rival's power. The incident is said to have shaken him greatly.

Finally, Saga decided to veto the relocation of the capital. Four days after Heizei's move, he sent delegates to Ise Province, Ōmi Province, and Mino Province commanding them to tighten their borders. In addition, he captured Fujiwara no Nakanari, placing him under military confinement and demoting him to provisional governor of Sado Province. He also divested Kusuko of her rank and released an imperial edict describing her sins. Meanwhile, he promoted the three officials he had appointed to manage construction: Tamuramaro to dainagon, Fuyutsugu to vice-minister of the Shikibu-shō, and Taue to governor of Owari Province.

The next day, Saga sent secret envoys to Heijō-kyō to call together a few high officials. Fujiwara no Manatsu and Funya no Watamaro returned to Heian-kyō, but Watamaro was deemed to be on Heizei's side and imprisoned.

When Heizei learned of all this he was enraged, and decided to travel east personally to gather an army. Many of his retainers, including the chūnagon Fujiwara no Kadonomaro, warned him strongly against this, but Heizei boarded a palanquin with Kusuko and embarked.

Saga ordered Sakanoue no Tamuramaro to block Heizei's move. As Tamuramaro left, he asked for the release of Watamaro, his former comrade from the subjugation of the Emishi, and Watamaro was pardoned and appointed as sangi. That evening, Nakanari was shot to death. This was a rare application of the death penalty during the Heian period — the next execution was almost 350 years later, when Minamoto no Tameyoshi was executed after the Hōgen Rebellion in 1156.

Heizei and Kusuko made it only as far as Soekami District in Yamato Province before realizing that Emperor Saga's forces had tightened their guard. With no hope of victory, they reluctantly returned to Heijō-kyō. Ex-Emperor Heizei shaved his head and became a monk, and Fujiwara no Kusuko committed suicide by drinking poison.

== Aftermath ==
After the incident was resolved, Emperor Saga commanded that those involved be treated leniently. Crown Prince Takaoka was disinherited as crown prince, and Saga appointed his own younger brother Prince Ōtomo, the future Emperor Junna, as crown prince in his stead. When Heizei died in 824, Saga, who had by this time himself abdicated, got his successor Junna to pardon the guilty parties.

The monk Kūkai, who had prayed for Emperor Saga's side during the incident, was also able to use this success as an opportunity to elevate himself as the leading Buddhist figure in Japan.

== Individuals punished in connection with the incident ==
| Person | Position | Punishment |
|---|---|---|
| Ex-Emperor Heizei | Retired Emperor | Became a monk |
| Prince Takaoka | Crown Prince | Disinherited |
| Prince Abo | Fourth rank (四品) | Demoted to director of the Dazaifu |
| Prince Isono (礒野王) | ju go-i no jō (従五位上) and master of documents (図書頭) | Demoted to provisional vice-governor of Izu Province |
| Prince Taguchi (田口王) | ju go-i no ge (従五位下) | Demoted to provisional governor of Tosa Province |
| Prince Masuga (真菅王) | ju go-i no ge (従五位下) | Demoted to provisional governor of Iki Province |
| Fujiwara no Kusuko | shō san-mi (正三位) and Naishi-no-kami (尚侍) | Removed from office and committed suicide |
| Fujiwara no Nakanari | ju shi-i no ge (従四位下) and sangi | Demoted to provisional governor of Sado Province and executed (shooting) |
| Fujiwara no Yasutsugu (藤原安継) | ju go-i no ge (従五位下) and vice-director of the Ōtoneri-ryō (大舎人助) | Demoted to provisional governor of Satsuma Province |
| Fujiwara no Sadamoto (藤原貞本) | ju go-i no ge (従五位下) and vice-minister of the Ministry of the Treasury | Demoted to provisional governor of Hida Province |
| Fujiwara no Naganushi (藤原永主) | | Banished to Hyūga Province |
| Fujiwara no Yamanushi (藤原山主) | | Banished to Hyūga Province |
| Fujiwara no Fujinushi (藤原藤主) | | Banished to Hyūga Province |
| Fujiwara no Manatsu | shō shi-i no ge (正四位下) and sangi | Demoted to provisional governor of Izu Province, and then of Bitchū Province |
| Ki no Taue (紀田上) | ju shi-i no ge (従四位下) and governor of Owari Province | Demoted to provisional governor of Sato Province |
| Ki no Yoshikado (紀良門) | ju go-i no ge (従五位下) and governor of Echigo Province | Demoted to provisional vice-governor of Hizen Province |
| Ō no Iruka (多入鹿) | ju shi-i no ge (従四位下) and sangi | Demoted to provisional governor of Sanuki Province, then Aki Province, then back to Sanuki |
| Sugano no Niwanushi (菅野庭主) | shō go-i no jō (正五位上) and chief carpenter (木工頭) | Demoted to provisional governor of Awa Province |
| Ōnakatomi no Tokomaro (大中臣常麻呂) | ju go-i no jō (従五位上) and second assistant director of the Hyōbu-shō | Demoted to provisional governor of Bizen Province, then governor of Iyo Province |
| Tomo no Wataketamaro (伴和武多麻呂) | ju go-i no jō (従五位上) and major general in the imperial guard (左近衛少将) | Demoted to provisional vice-governor of Musashi Province, then provisional governor of Hyūga Province |
| Omuro no Koretsugu (御室是嗣) | ju go-i no jō (従五位上) | Demoted to provisional governor of Ōsumi Province, then provisional vice-governor of Chikugo Province |
| Omuro no Ujitsugu (御室氏継) | ju go-i no jō (従五位上) | Demoted to provisional governor of Satsuma Province |
| Abe no Kiyotsugu (安倍清継) | ju go-i no ge (従五位下) and vice-governor of Echizen Province | Demoted to provisional governor of Aki Province, then banished to Hōki Province |
| Taima no Suzukimaro (当麻鱸麻呂) | ju go-i no ge (従五位下) | Demoted to provisional governor of Awaji Province |
| Kudara no Konikishi no Chikauke (百済王愛筌) | Provisional second inspector of Echizen Province | Banished to Awa Province |
| Nagano no Kiyotsu (永野浄津) | | Banished to Echizen Province |
| Ise no Yasumaro (伊勢安麻呂) | | Banished to Noto Province |
