= Hamano =

Hamano (written: 浜野 or 濱野) is a Japanese surname. Notable people with the surname include:

- Eiji Hamano (浜野 栄次, 1923–1992), Japanese photographer
- Harumitsu Hamano (浜野 治光, born 1957), Japanese golfer
- Junio Hamano, Japanese software developer
- Kazco Hamano (born 1970), Japanese singer
- Kenta Hamano (浜野 謙太, born 1981), Japanese musician, composer and actor
- Sachi Hamano (浜野 佐知, born 1948), Japanese film director
- Yuji Hamano (濱野 裕二, born 1980), Japanese archer
- Yuki Hamano (濵野 勇気, born 1978), Japanese football player

== See also ==
- Hamano Station, a railway station in Chiba, Chiba Prefecture, Japan
