= Cloistered rule =

Japanese system of imperial politics

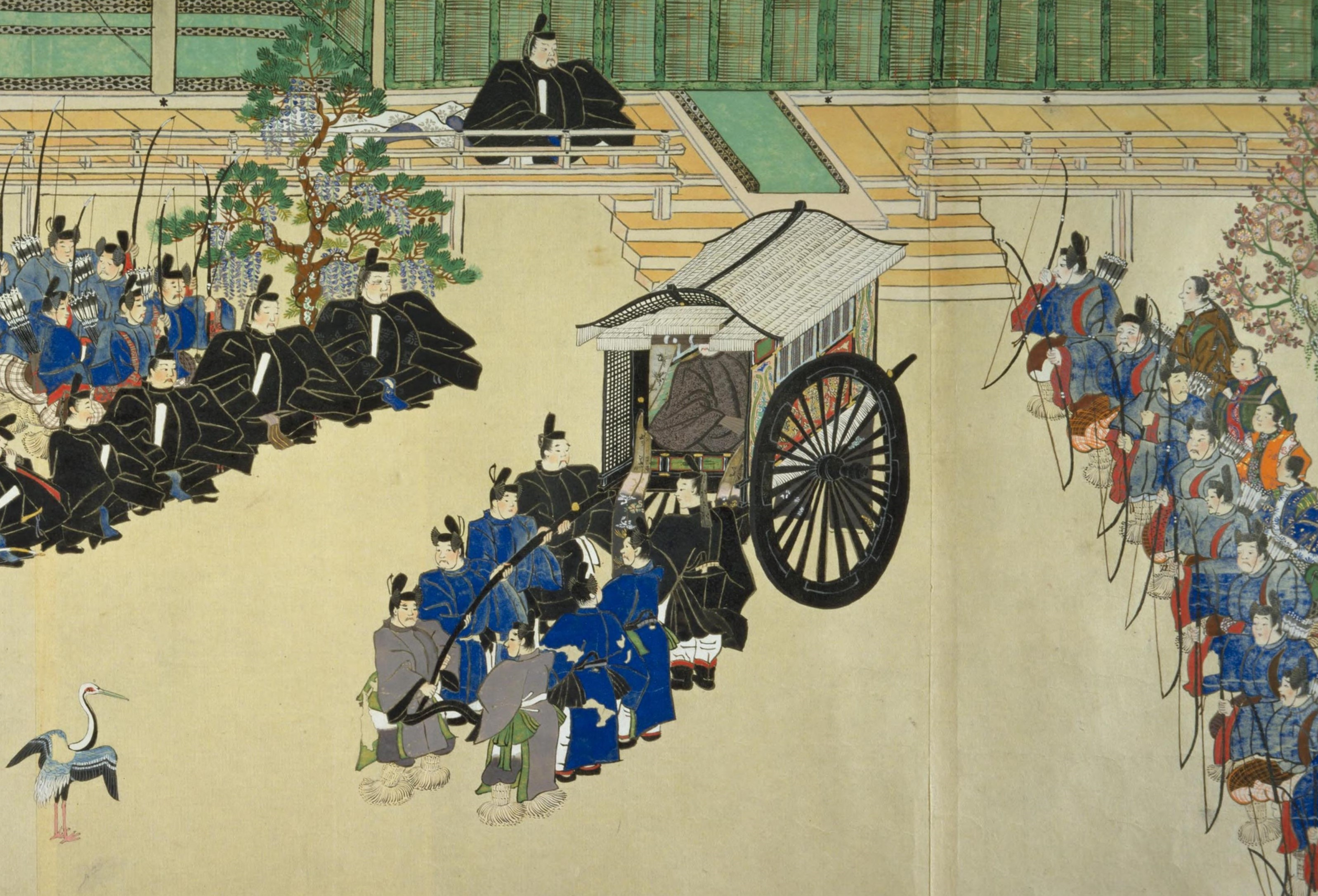
A scene from the Kasuga Gongen Genki E depicting the procession of the retired emperor Shirakawa

Cloistered rule (院政, insei; lit. "monastery administration") was a form of government in Japan during the Heian period. In this bifurcated system, an emperor abdicated, but retained power and influence. Those retired emperors, who withdrew to live in monasteries (院, in), continued to act in ways intended to counterbalance the influence of Fujiwara regents and the warrior class. Simultaneously, the titular emperor, the former emperor's chosen successor, fulfilled all the ceremonial roles and formal duties of the monarchy.

Retired emperors were called Daijō Tennō or Jōkō. A retired emperor who entered a Buddhist monastic community became a Cloistered Emperor (in Japanese: 太上法皇, romanized: Daijō Hōō).

There were retired emperors, including cloistered emperors, both before and after the Heian period, but the notion of cloistered rule as a system usually refers to the practice put in place by Emperor Shirakawa in 1086 and followed by his successors until the rise of the Kamakura shogunate in 1192.

== Background ==
The ritsuryō allowed retired emperors to exert some limited powers, and there are early examples such as Empress Jitō, Emperor Shōmu and Emperor Uda in the 7th, 8th and 9th centuries respectively.

By the end of the 10th century, the Hokke family of the Fujiwara clan held political power in Japan through the office of the Imperial Regent, and the emperor increasingly became little more than a figurehead. In 1068, Emperor Go-Sanjō became the first emperor in almost 200 years who was not related either by marriage or blood, or both, to the Hokke family. He exerted personal power while the Hokke family was dealing with internal conflicts between Fujiwara no Yorimichi and his brother Fujiwara no Norimichi, and was in a position to issue several laws and regulations, most notably the Enkyū Shōen Regulation Decree, thus weakening the regency. In 1072, however, he fell ill and abdicated in favor of Emperor Shirakawa. He died the following year. Although he did not have time to exert power after his abdication, Sanjō had weakened the regency and paved the way for the practice of cloistered rule.

In 1086, Emperor Shirakawa in his turn abdicated in favor of his son, Emperor Horikawa, who was four years old at the time. Shirakawa's objective appeared to be the protection of his son from his younger brother (Horikawa's uncle), who presented a serious threat of becoming a pretender to the throne, but after his retirement Shirakawa exerted his personal power to set the cloistered rule system in motion.

== End of the Heian period ==
Separate imperial courts (In no Chō (院庁) evolved around the retired emperors, and their will was put into effect through offices known as Inzen (院宣) and In no Chō Kudashi Bumi (院庁下文). Cloistered emperors also had their own troops, the Hokumen no Bushi (北面の武士). The creation of these military units led eventually to the rise to power of the Taira clan, who used their membership of these units to gather political and economic power to themselves.

The end of the Heian period was marked by a rapid succession of cloistered emperors, to the point that there were several retired emperors living at the same time. The Hōgen Rebellion, following the death of the Emperor Toba, was an example of direct opposition between an emperor and an emperor emeritus. Finally, the end of the reign of Emperor Go-Shirakawa was marked by the Genpei War and the rise of Minamoto no Yoritomo as the first Kamakura shōgun.

=== Table ===
The succession of power in the Insei system was complex.

Insei System of Imperial Rule
Emperor's Ordinal Number	Reign dates	Emperor of Japan	Senior Insei Emperor	Other Insei Emperors
71	1067—1072	Emperor Go-Sanjō
72	1072—1073	Emperor Shirakawa	Go-Sanjō
	1073—1086	Shirakawa
73	1086—1107	Emperor Horikawa	Shirakawa
74	1107—1123	Emperor Toba	Shirakawa
75	1123—1129	Emperor Sutoku	Shirakawa	Toba
	1129—1141	Sutoku	Toba
76	1141—1155	Emperor Konoe	Toba	Sutoku
77	1155—1156	Emperor Go-Shirakawa	Toba	Sutoku
	1156—1158	Go-Shirakawa		Sutoku
78	1158—1165	Emperor Nijō	Go-Shirakawa
79	1165—1168	Emperor Rokujō	Go-Shirakawa
80	1168—1180	Emperor Takakura	Go-Shirakawa	Rokujō (until 1176)
81	1180—1185	Emperor Antoku	Go-Shirakawa	Takakura (until 1181)
82	1184—1192	Emperor Go-Toba	Go-Shirakawa
	1192—1198	Go-Toba

== During the Shogunates ==
The establishment of the Kamakura shogunate is taken to mark the beginning of the Kamakura period, but the Insei system was not immediately abandoned. Though the shogunate took over the police force and ruled eastern Japan, the authority of the emperors and retired emperors remained considerable. However, when Go-Toba, a grandson of Go-Shirakawa, sought to overthrow the Kamakura shogunate, his forces were defeated in the Jōkyū War, and the shogunate then took steps to reduce the power (and the finances) of the retired emperors. Even after the Jōkyū War, the cloistered rule system continued to exist, at least formally, for another 200 years. There were movements to take authority back into the hands of the imperial court, such as the Kenmu Restoration attempted by Emperor Go-Daigo, but in general a retired emperor presided as the head of the Kyoto court, with the approval of the shogunate.

There were also a few examples of retired emperors supervising their successors much later, during the Edo period. The last person to use the title Daijō Hōō was Emperor Reigen, in 1687.

== See also ==
- Retired Emperor (disambiguation)
- Cloistered Emperor
- Daijō Tennō
