= Kōji (Heian period) =

Period of Japanese history (1142–1144 CE)

Kōji (康治) was a Japanese era name (年号, nengō, lit. "year name") after Eiji and before Ten'yō. This period spanned the year from April 1142 through February 1144. The reigning emperor was Konoe-tennō (近衛天皇).

== Change of Era ==
- January 29, 1142 Kōji gannen (康治元年): The new era name was created to mark an event or series of events. The previous era ended and a new one commenced in Eiji 2, on the 28th day of the 4th month of 1142.

== Events of the Kōji Era ==
- 1143 (Kōji 2, 1st month): Cloistered Emperor Go-Toba-in, now known by the title Daijō Tennō or Daijō Hōō (太上法皇) or Hōō, visited his mother.
- 1143 (Kōji 2, 5th month): Emperor Konoe passed his days praying at Tōdai-ji and also at the temples on Mount Hiei (比叡山, Hiei-zan).

== Notes ==
Preceded by Eiji	Era or nengō Kōji; 1142–1144	Succeeded by Ten'yō
