= Eiji Ikeda =

Japanese manga artist

- 池田永治
- Born: 15 October 1889; Kyoto, Japan
- Died: 30 December 1950 (aged 61)

Eiji Ikeda (15 October 1889 - 30 December 1950) was a Japanese cartoonist, painter, illustrator, and haiga artist.

== Life ==
Born in Kiyamachi, Kyoto in 1889 and raised in Osaka. Beginning at age 7, he trained with his father as a woodblock printer. After graduating high school, he continued this work, apprenticing at a print and plate company.

Following his father's death in 1908, he moved from Osaka to Tokyo in 1909 to pursue a career in painting. There, he joined the Pacific Art Association and began participating in national-level, juried painting exhibitions, for which his work won several commendations. In 1921, he married his wife Hisato Ikeda (née Kumaki), with whom he had five children, Taka, Hiro, Tatsumi, Kano, and Tatsuhiko.

== Career ==
At the age of 19, he began having his cartoons and illustrations published in various magazines and serials. He was a founding member of the Japan Cartoon Society in 1923, alongside artists Ippei Okamoto, Koichiro Kondo, Hitoshi Ikebe, Ryōei Hattori, and others. In 1930, he began serializing his best known work, the comic strip Pichibe, in the Yomiuri Shimbun. In 1931, he officially joined the Yomiuri Shimbun's manga department, for which he drew a number of political cartoons and comic strips.

After studying haiga under the artist Usen Ogawa from 1916-1918, Ikeda became deeply interested in the form. He created a hybrid haiga comic strip called, "Haiku Masterpieces, Turned into Manga" for the Yomiuri Sunday Manga supplement of the Yomiuri Shimbun. His continued interest in haiga painting culminated in the book, "A New Philosophy of Haiga Techniques," published in 1941.

In 1935, he began teaching at the Reformed Pacific School of Fine Arts.

== Death ==
In 1949, his diabetes worsened and he moved to the village of Ao in Toyama prefecture to be cared for by his daughter, Hiro. He died in 1950 at the age of 62.

== Works ==
- 『新理念俳画の技法』published by 芸術学院出版部、1941
- 『少年漫画 ピチベでかした』published by 牧歌社、2005
- 『俳画家池田永一治俳句集』published by 神戸新聞総合出版センター、2019
- 『画家池田永治の記録』published by 神戸新聞総合出版センター、2019

== Collections ==
- British Museum
- Edo-Tokyo Museum
