= Fujiwara no Tanetsugu =

Japanese noble

Fujiwara no Tanetsugu 藤原種継
- Born: 737
- Died: 785 (aged 47–48)
- Family: Fujiwara Shikike
- Father: Fujiwara no Kiyonari

Fujiwara no Tanetsugu (藤原 種継; 737 – November 4, 785) was a Japanese noble of the late Nara period. He was the grandson of the sangi Fujiwara no Umakai, the founder of the Fujiwara Shikike. He reached the court rank of shō san-mi (正三位) and the position of chūnagon. He was posthumously awarded the rank of shō ichi-i (正一位) and the position of daijō-daijin.

== Life ==
The Shoku Nihongi first mentions Tanetsugu in 766, when he was promoted from ju roku-i no jō (従六位上) to ju go-i no ge (従五位下). Two years later, in 768, he was appointed as governor of Mimasaka Province.

Thanks to the Shikike's staunch support of Emperor Kōnin's ascension, the family was successful in his court. Tanetsugu held various positions as a provincial governor, as well as civil and military roles, and was steadily promoted through the ranks, reaching ju shi-i no ge (従四位下) in 781. After the deaths of his uncles Fujiwara no Yoshitsugu and Fujiwara no Momokawa, Tanetsugu came to represent the Shikike as the oldest grandson of Umakai.

Along with the ascension of Emperor Kanmu in 781, Tanetsugu was promoted to ju shi-i no jō (従四位上). With the Emperor's deep trust, Tanetsugu was promoted quickly, joining the kugyō with a promotion to sangi in 782. In 783, he was promoted to ju san-mi (従三位), and in 784 was made chūnagon.

=== Nagaoka-kyō ===
In 784, Kanmu wanted to move the capital away from Heijō-kyō. Tanetsugu recommended the location of Nagaoka-kyō as the spot for the new capital. By the Emperor's command, Tanetsugu inspected the site along with Fujiwara no Oguromaro, Saeki no Imaemishi, Ki no Funamori, Ōnakatomi no Kōyu, and Sakanoue no Karitamaro. Later that year, Tanetsugu was put in charge of the construction of the new capital. His appointment may have had the backing of his mother's family, the Hata clan, whose base of operations in Yamashiro Province was near the new capital site. Several members of the Hata clan were later promoted into the aristocracy based on their meritorious service in the construction.

=== Assassination ===
In 785, soon after the move of the capital, Tanetsugu was shot with an arrow while supervising the construction, and died the next day. Emperor Kanmu was absent at the time, visiting Yamato Province. Ōtomo no Takeyoshi (大伴竹良) was first arrested for the assassination, and after an investigation ten more people were executed, including Ōtomo no Tsuguhito (大伴継人) and Saeki no Takanari (佐伯高成). Ōtomo no Yakamochi, who had died a month before the incident, was identified as the ringleader and removed from the register of past officials. Several more people were implicated and exiled.

Later, Prince Sawara was disinherited from his position as crown prince and exiled to Awaji Province, but died en route. There may have been discord between Sawara and Tanetsugu, but whether Sawara was actually involved in the assassination is not clear. A number of the officials involved in the assassination, including Takanari, were employed in the Crown Prince's Quarters. This incident, along with the fear of Sawara's vengeful ghost, contributed to the decision to move the capital again to Heian-kyō a short time later.

Tanetsugu's final rank was shō san-mi (正三位), and he held the positions of chūnagon and director of the Shikibu-shō. He was 49 when he died. Emperor Kanmu posthumously promoted him to shō ichi-i (正一位) and sadaijin, and in 809 he was granted the additional posthumous position of Daijō-daijin.

=== Individuals punished in connection with the incident ===
Person	Position	Punishment	Pardon
Prince Sawara	Crown Prince	Disinherited and exiled to Awaji Province; died in transit	Posthumously elevated to the throne as Emperor Sudō in 800
Haruhara no Ioe (五百枝王)	ju shi-i no jō (従四位上) and division chief in the imperial guard (右兵衛督)	Banished to Iyo Province	Rank restored in 806
Ōtomo no Yakamochi	ju san-mi (従三位) and chūnagon	Dead at the time, but stripped of his rank	Rank posthumously restored in 806
Ōtomo no Tsuguhito (大伴継人)	ju go-i no ge (従五位下) and sadaiben (左少弁)	Death (Beheading)	Rank posthumously restored in 806
Ōtomo no Mamaro (大伴真麻呂)	ju go-i no ge (従五位下) and director of the tax bureau (主税頭)	Death (Beheading)	Rank posthumously restored in 806
Ōtomo no Naganushi (大伴永主)	ju go-i no ge (従五位下) and assistant director of the Capital (右京亮)	Banished to Oki Province	Rank restored in 806
Ōtomo no Takeyoshi (大伴竹良)	General in the imperial guard (右衛門大尉)	Death (Beheading)	
Ōtomo no Minatomaro (大伴湊麻呂)	Yamato-taijō (大和大掾)	Death (Beheading)	
Ōtomo no Kunimichi (大伴国道)		Banishment to Sado Province	Pardoned and returned to the capital in 803
Saeki no Takanari (佐伯高成)	Assistant inspector in the Crown Prince's Quarters (春宮少進)	Death (Beheading)	
Ki no Shiromaro (紀白麻呂)	ju go-i no jō (従五位上) and assistant director of the Crown Prince's Quarters (春宮亮)	Banished to Oki Province	Restored to rank of shō go-i no ge (正五位上) in 806
Fujiwara no Oyori (藤原雄依)	shō shi-i no ge (正四位下) and director of the Ministry of the Treasury (大蔵卿)	Banished to Oki Province	Restored to rank of ju shi-i no ge (従四位下) in 806
Tajihi no Hamahito (多治比浜人)	Chief secretary in the Crown Prince's Quarters (春宮主書首)	Death (Beheading)	
Hayashi no Inamaro (林稲麻呂)	Outside (外) ju go-i no ge (従五位下) and tutor to the Crown Prince (東宮学士)	Banished to Izu Province	Rank restored in 806
Hōki no Bachimaro (伯耆桴麻呂)	In the imperial guard (近衛)	Death (Beheading)	
Oshika no Kitsumimaro (牡鹿木積麻呂)	In the imperial guard (中衛)	Death (Beheading)	

== Genealogy ==
- Father: Fujiwara no Kiyonari
- Mother: daughter of Hata no Asamoto (秦朝元の娘)
- Wife: daughter of Awata no Michimaro (粟田道麻呂)
  - Eldest son: Fujiwara no Nakanari (藤原仲成; 764–810)
- Wife: daughter of Yamamoto no Nakamune (山口中宗女)
  - Son: Fujiwara no Yamahito (藤原山人)
- Wife: daughter of Karidaka no Samimaro (雁高佐美麻呂)
  - Second son: Fujiwara no Kazuramaro (藤原縵麻呂; 768–821)
- Wife: daughter of Fujiwara no Tsugutada (藤原継縄)
  - Son: Fujiwara no Yasutsugu (藤原安継), possibly instead a son of Kiyonari
- Wife: daughter of Fujiwara no Tadanushi (藤原縄主)
- Other children:
  - Son: Fujiwara no Fujio (藤原藤生)
  - Fourth son: Fujiwara no Yotsugu (藤原世嗣; 779–831)
  - Son: Ide no Yumori (井出湯守)
  - Daughter: Fujiwara no Kusuko (藤原薬子; ?–810), court lady of Emperor Heizei
  - Daughter: Fujiwara no Azumako (藤原東子; ?–816), court lady of Emperor Kanmu
