= Daijō Tennō =

Title for a retired emperor of Japan

Daijō Tennō or Dajō Tennō (太上天皇) is a title for an Emperor of Japan who abdicates the Chrysanthemum Throne in favour of a successor. It is sometimes translated as "Emperor Emeritus". It is known as the Jōkō (上皇).

As defined in the Taihō Code, although retired, a Daijō Tennō could still exert power. The first such example is the Empress Jitō in the 7th century. A retired emperor sometimes entered the Buddhist monastic community, becoming a cloistered emperor. During late Heian period, cloistered emperors wielded power in a system known as cloistered rule.

== List ==
A total of 64 Japanese emperors have abdicated. This includes individuals who were never enthroned but were granted the title of Daijō Tennō (太上天皇, Emperor Emeritus). A list follows:

Name	Acceded	Abdicated	Died	Successor	Notes
Jitō	686	697	703	Monmu	Prince Kusabake was named as crown prince to succeed Empress Jitō, but he died aged only 27. Kusabake's son, Prince Karu, was then named as Jitō's successor. He eventually would become known as Emperor Monmu. After Jitō abdicated in Monmu's favor, as a retired sovereign, she took the post-reign title daijō-tennō. After this, her imperial successors who retired took the same title after abdication. Jitō continued to hold power as a cloistered ruler, which became a persistent trend in Japanese politics. She died 4 years later at the age of 58.
Genmei	707	715	721	Genshō	Gemmei had initially planned to remain on the throne until her grandson might reach maturity. However, after reigning for 8 years, Gemmei abdicated in favor of Monmu's older sister who then became known as Empress Genshō.: 715 (Wadō 8): Gemmei resigned as empress in favor of her daughter, who was then known as Empress Genshō.; After abdicating, Gemmei was known as Daijō-tennō; she was only the second woman after Empress Jitō to claim this title. Gemmei lived in retirement until her death at the age of 61.
Genshō	715	724	748	Shōmu	
Shōmu	724	749	756	Kōken	
Kōken	749	758	770 (restored 764)	Junnin	Emperor Shōmu abdicated in favor of his daughter Princess Takano in 749, who became Empress Kōken. Empress Kōken abdicated in 758 for her cousin to reign as Emperor Junnin but returned to rule again in 764 as Empress Shōtoku. Her cousin would die a year later in 765.
Junnin	758	764 (deposed)	765	Shōtoku (Kōken)	
Kōnin	770	781	781	Kanmu	
Heizei	806	809	824	Saga	Emperor Heizei was forced to abdicate due to illness in 809 and lived for 14 years as a monk.
Saga	809	823	842	Junna	
Junna	823	833	840	Nimmyō	
Seiwa	858	876	881	Yōzei	
Yōzei	876	884 (deposed)	949	Kōkō	
Uda	887	897	931	Daigo	
Daigo	897	930	930	Suzaku	Emperor Daigo abdicated in favour of his son, as he fell ill, and died a few months later.
Suzaku	930	946	952	Murakami	
Reizei	967	969	1011	En'yū	Anna 2 969: Reizei abdicated; and he took the honorific title of Reizei-in Jōkō. His reign lasted for just two years; and he lived another 44 years in retirement.; Kankō 8, 24th day of the 10th month (1011): Daijō-tennō Reizei-in Jōkō died at age 62.
En'yū	969	984	991	Kazan	
Kazan	984	986	1008	Ichijō	
Ichijō	986	1011	1011	Sanjō	
Sanjō	1011	1016	1017	Go-Ichijō	
Go-Suzaku	1036	1045	1045	Go-Reizei	
Go-Sanjō	1068	1073	1073	Shirakawa	Kankō 8, on the 13th day of the 6th month (1011): In the 25th year of Emperor Ichijō's reign (一条天皇25年), the emperor abdicated; and the succession (senso) was received by his cousin. Shortly thereafter, Emperor Sanjō is said to have acceded to the throne (sokui) at age 36.; Kankō 8, 22nd day of the 6th month (1011): Daijō-tennō Emperor Ichijō died at the age of 32.
Shirakawa	1073	1087	1129	Horikawa	Ōtoku 3, on the 26th day of the 11th month (1084): Emperor Shirakawa formally abdicated, and he took the title Daijō Tennō. Shirakawa had personally occupied the throne for 14 years; and for the next 43 years, he would exercise broad powers in what will come to be known as cloistered rule.; Emperor Go-Sanjō had wished for Shirakawa's younger half-brother to succeed him to the throne. In 1085, this half-brother died of an illness; and Shirakawa's own son, Taruhito became Crown Prince. On the same day that Taruhito was proclaimed as his heir, Shirakawa abdicated; and Taruhito became Emperor Horikawa. The now-retired Emperor Shirakawa was the first to attempt what became customary cloistered rule. He exercised power, ruling indirectly from the Shirakawa-in ("White River Mansion/Temple"); nevertheless, nominal sesshō and kampaku offices continued to exist for a long time.: Kanji 1, in the 5th month (1087): Daijō Tennō Shirakawa retired himself to Uji.
Toba	1107	1123	1156	Sutoku	Eiji 1, in the 3rd month (1141): The former emperor Toba accepted the tonsure and became a Buddhist monk at the age of 39 years.; Kōji 2, in the 1st month (1143): Cloistered Emperor Toba-in, now known by the title Daijō Hōō, visited his mother.
Sutoku	1123	1142	1164	Konoe	Eiji 1, on the 7th day of the 12th month (永治元年; 1141): In the 18th year of Sutoku-tennō's reign (崇徳天皇18年), the emperor abdicated; and the succession (senso) was received by a younger brother, the 8th son of former Emperor Toba. Shortly thereafter, Emperor Konoe is said to have acceded to the throne (sokui).; At that time, Fujiwara-no Tadamichi became sesshō (imperial regent). The Cloistered Emperor Toba continued to direct all the affairs of government, while the retired Emperor Sutoku had no powers. This conflict resulted in many controversies during Konoe's reign.
Go-Shirakawa	1155	1158	1192	Nijō	
Nijō	1158	1165	1165	Rokujō	
Rokujō	1165	1168	1176	Takakura	
Takakura	1168	1180	1181	Antoku	
Go-Toba	1183	1198	1239	Tsuchimikado	
Tsuchimikado	1198	1210	1231	Juntoku	
Juntoku	1210	1221	1242	Chūkyō	
Chūkyō	1221	1221	1234	Go-Horikawa	
（Go-Takakura）			1223	（Go-Horikawa）	He is Emperor Go-Horikawa's father. As a special exception, he was granted the title of Daijō Tennō (Go-Takakura).
Go-Horikawa	1221	1232	1234	Shijō	
Go-Saga	1242	1246	1272	Go-Fukakusa	
Go-Fukakusa	1246	1259	1304	Kameyama	
Kameyama	1259	1274	1305	Go-Uda	
Go-Uda	1274	1287	1324	Fushimi	
Fushimi	1287	1298	1317	Go-Fushimi	
Go-Fushimi	1298	1301	1336	Go-Nijō	
Hanazono	1308	1318	1348	Go-Daigo	
Kōgon	1331	1333 (deposed)	1364	Go-Daigo	
Go-Daigo	1318	1339	1339	Go-Murakami	
Kōmyō (North)	1336	1348	1380	Sukō (North)	
Sukō (North)	1348	1351	1398	Go-Kōgon (North)	
Go-Kōgon (North)	1352	1371	1374	Go-En'yū (North)	
Chōkei (South)	1368	1383	1394	Go-Kameyama (South)	
Go-En'yū (North)	1371	1382	1393	Go-Komatsu (North)	
Go-Kameyama (South)	1383	1392	1424	Go-Komatsu	
Go-Komatsu	1382 (N) 1392 (S)	1412	1433	Shōkō	
（Go-Sukō）			1456	（Go-Hanazono）	He is Emperor Go-Hanazono's father. As a special exception, he was granted the title of Daijō Tennō (Go-Sukō).
Go-Hanazono	1428	1464	1471	Go-Tsuchimikado	Emperor Go-Hanazono abdicated in 1464, but not long afterwards, the Ōnin War (応仁の乱, Ōnin no Ran) broke out; there were no further abdications until 1586, when Emperor Ōgimachi passed the throne to his grandson, Emperor Go-Yōzei. This was due to the disturbed state of the country; and the fact that there was neither a house for an ex-emperor nor money to support him or it.
Ogimachi	1557	1586	1593	Go-Yōzei	
（Yōkō）			1586	（Go-Yōzei）	He is Emperor Emperor Go-Yozei's father and Emperor Ogimachi's son. He died before ascending the throne. As a special exception, he was granted the title of Daijō Tennō (Yōkō).
Go-Yōzei	1586	1611	1617	Go-Mizunoo	
Go-Mizunoo	1611	1629	1680	Meishō	
Meishō	1629	1643	1696	Go-Kōmyō	
Go-Sai	1655	1663	1685	Reigen	
Reigen	1663	1687	1732	Higashiyama	
Higashiyama	1687	1709	1710	Nakamikado	
Nakamikado	1709	1735	1737	Sakuramachi	
Sakuramachi	1735	1747	1750	Momozono	
Momozono	1747	1762	1762	Go-Sakuramachi	
Go-Sakuramachi	1762	1771	1813	Go-Momozono	In the history of Japan, Empress Go-Sakuramachi was the last of eight women to take on the role of empress regnant. The seven female monarchs who reigned before Go-Sakuramachi were Suiko, Kōgyoku (Saimei), Jitō, Genmei, Genshō, Kōken (Shōtoku), and Meishō. She reigned from 15 September 1762 to 9 January 1771 and died on 24 December 1813.
（Kyōkō）			1794	（Kōkaku）	He is Emperor Kokaku's father. Upon his accession to the throne, Emperor Kōkaku attempted to confer the title of Daijō Tennō upon his father, but the plan did not come to fruition due to opposition from the Tokugawa Shogunate (Sōngō Ikken, 尊号一件). As a special exception, he was granted the title of Daijō Tennō (Kyōkō) during the Meiji era.
Kōkaku	1780	1817	1840	Ninkō	Prior to the start of the third millennium the last emperor to become a jōkō was Kōkaku in 1817. He later created an incident called the "Songo incident" (the "respectful title incident"). The jōkō disputed with the Tokugawa Shogunate about his intention to give a title of Abdicated Emperor (Daijō-tennō) to his father, who was Imperial Prince Sukehito. He died on 11 December 1840.
Akihito	1989	2019	Living	Naruhito	Further information: 2019 Japanese imperial transition The special law authorizing the abdication of Emperor Akihito on 30 April 2019 provides that the title of Jōkō will be revived for him. As there was no official English translation of the title of Jōkō previously, the Imperial Household Agency decided to define it as "Emperor Emeritus".

== Abdication during the Empire of Japan ==
=== Emperor Kōmei and the Shōgun ===
Commodore Matthew C. Perry and his squadron of what the Japanese dubbed "the Black Ships" sailed into the harbor at Edo (now known as Tokyo) in July 1853. Perry sought to open Japan to trade, and warned the Japanese of military consequences if they did not agree. During the crisis brought on by Perry's arrival, the Tokugawa shogunate took, for the first time in at least 250 years, the highly unusual step of consulting with the Imperial Court, and Emperor Kōmei's officials advised that they felt the Americans should be allowed to trade and asked that they be informed in advance of any steps to be taken upon Perry's return. Feeling at a disadvantage against Western powers, the Japanese government allowed trade and submitted to the "Unequal Treaties", giving up tariff authority and the right to try foreigners in its own courts. The shogunate's willingness to consult with the Imperial Court was short-lived: in 1858, word of a treaty arrived with a letter stating that due to shortness of time, it had not been possible to consult. Emperor Kōmei was so incensed that he threatened to abdicate—though even this action would have required the consent of the shōgun.

=== Meiji constitution on abdication ===
Emperor Meiji wished to allow a clause codifying the right to abdicate and the formal institution of Daijō Tennō in the new Meiji Constitution. The Prime Minister refused, stating that the Emperor should be above politics, and that in the past, the role of Daijō Tennō had most definitely been employed in the opposite fashion.

=== Emperor Taishō and regency ===
In 1921, it became clear that Emperor Yoshihito (later known by his reign name, Taishō, after death) was mentally incapacitated. In pre-modern Japan, he would have been forced to abdicate, but he was left in place and Crown Prince Hirohito (later Emperor Hirohito) was made Sesshō (regent).

== Modern era ==
In 2019, then Emperor Akihito abdicated in favour of then Crown Prince Naruhito. He was the first Emperor of Japan to abdicate in modern times. He was officially given the title Jōkō (上皇), rendered in English as "Emperor Emeritus". His wife, Empress Michiko, was similarly given the title Jōkōgō (上皇后)—in English, "Empress Emerita".

== See also ==
- Emeritus
- Taishang Huang – retired Chinese emperor
- Taesangwang – retired Korean ruler
- Retired Emperor (disambiguation)
