= The Empty Box and Zeroth Maria =

Japanese light novel series

- Cover of the first light novel volume.

空ろの箱と零のマリア (Utsuro no Hako to Zero no Maria)
- Genre: Action, Romance, Mystery, Thriller
- Light novel
- Written by: Eiji Mikage
- Illustrated by: Tetsuo (415)
- Published by: ASCII Media Works
- English publisher: NA: Yen Press
- Imprint: Dengeki Bunko
- Original run: January 10, 2009 – June 10, 2015
- Volumes: 7

The Empty Box and Zeroth Maria, known in Japan as Utsuro no Hako to Zero no Maria (空ろの箱と零のマリア; lit. The Hollow Box and the Maria of Zero) and colloquially referred to as Hakomari (箱マリ), is a Japanese light novel series written by Eiji Mikage, with illustrations by Tetsuo. (Note: Credited as "415" in the first volume.) ASCII Media Works published seven novels from January 2009 to June 2015 under their Dengeki Bunko imprint. The novels have been licensed for release in North America by Yen Press.

== Plot ==
The story revolves around a carefree boy named Kazuki Hoshino, who is intensely attached to his normal daily life, and Aya Otonashi, who suddenly transfers into his class for the 13,118th time and declares her goal to "break" him forthwith. This starts an avalanche of events, involving a supernatural device known as the Boxes and a supernatural being, which pits the two characters against each other causing their friends to be caught under their crossfire.

== Characters ==
=== Main characters ===
Kazuki Hoshino (星野 一輝, Hoshino Kazuki)
Kazuki is the protagonist of the Hakomari series. He is a completely ordinary high school student who loves idle chatter with his friends and Umaibōs, a Japanese snack. The story begins when Kazuki is offered a box by O. Kazuki however refuses the box because the only thing that he wishes for is a normal everyday life. Because of Kazuki's disinterest in the box and his will for an everyday life, O becomes interested in Kazuki. O gives boxes to several people around Kazuki, and before Kazuki knows it his everyday is being destroyed in several different ways. O makes it his mission to study Kazuki in these different scenarios until he believes Kazuki will give in and use a box himself. One day, he is suddenly antagonized by Aya Otonashi — although he has never met her before. She threatens to "break" him.
Maria "Aya" Otonashi (音無 麻理亜, Otonashi Maria)
Maria is a beautiful but unsociable girl with a resolute personality. She transferred into Kazuki's class on March 2nd — almost at the end of the school year. Maria is very stern in her actions and beliefs. She expressed her wish to "break" Hoshino at the very beginning. There is one however one thing that Maria is terrified of, and that is killing someone else. No matter the circumstance, Maria refuses to kill anyone even if it meant saving Kazuki's life. Maria cares deeply for other people because of her wish to become a box herself and is willing to sacrifice her own memories in order to give other people a place where they can be happy inside her box.

=== Supporting characters ===
O (オー, Ō)
'O' (not to be confused with the numeral 0, "zero") is the main antagonist of the series and the giver of the wish-granting boxes. Throughout the series, 'O' demonstrates a fascination with Kazuki Hoshino (who rejected her offer of a box before the events of the story) that motivates her to alter and observe Kazuki's life by giving boxes to the people around him. A supernatural entity whose appearance constantly changes, 'O' describes herself as a "vector", a form and purpose that was given to a much larger, transcendent but ultimately purposeless being with the ability to grant wishes. Daiya Oomine later realizes that 'O' was created as a result of Maria Otonashi's initial wish that became The Flawed Bliss, with Kazuki Hoshino serving as 'O's counterpart, The Empty Box. At the start of the series, 'O' considers Kazuki to be very dear, but after coming to the realization of her origins, 'O' takes on the appearance of Maria's deceased older sister and declares Kazuki to be her enemy. Calculating and emotionless, 'O's one ultimate motivation seems to be the observation of interesting humans and the "screeching of their hearts".
Kokone Kirino (桐野 心音, Kirino Kokone)
Kokone is a bright and beautiful girl who cares a lot for her friends, but is meddlesome at times. She and Daiya have known each other since childhood, and their mutual verbal abuse has become legendary among their classmates ever since. Kokone is a very outgoing person. She likes to tease Kazuki, Haruaki and Daiya, who often tease her back.
Daiya Oomine (大嶺 醍哉, Oomine Daiya)
A self-centered and arrogant student who dyes his hair silver and wears three piercings in his right ear. He is the class president of the second year students and a shrewd friend of Kazuki's.
Kasumi Mogi (茂木 霞, Mogi Kasumi)
Kasumi is the girl who has won Kazuki's heart. She is docile, silent and expressionless. Kasumi lived a normal life going to school, however she was always depressed. Since she never showed any emotions herself, always forcing a smile onto her face, and was never happy, she thought everyone else must be faking it too. She thought nobody would ever notice her, until one day Kazuki ran towards her after she left school asking if she was okay, because she seemed bothered. Mogi denied having anything bothering her, but at the same time she fell in love with Kazuki as he noticed that her smile was fake.
Haruaki Usui (臼井 陽明, Usui Haruaki)
Haruaki is a cheerful but frivolous baseball ace. He often hangs out with Kazuki and Daiya.

=== Other ===
Ryu Miyazaki (宮崎 龍, Miyazaki Ryuu)
The class president of Kazuki's class. Considered by many to be a reliable and an exemplary student.
Riko Asami (浅海 莉子, Asami Riko)
One of Maria Otomashi's numerous fans that have emerged after the entrance ceremony. She's stubborn but cheerful.
Iroha Shindou (新藤 色葉, Shindou Iroha)
She is the student council president. She is very intelligent and very athletic, which enables her to attain almost anything she desires. She is close friends with Yuuri Yanagi and first appears at a similar time within the story.
Yuuri Yanagi (柳 悠里, Yanagi Yuuri)
An orderly and timorous girl who appears during the "Game of Idleness". She is a very close friend of the student council president Iroha Shindou.
Koudai Kamiuchi (神内 昂大, Kamiuchi Koudai)
A first year student who appears during the "Game of Idleness". He attended the same middle school as Kokone, Daiya, and Haruaki.
Ruka Hoshino (星野 流香, Hoshino Ruka)
Kazuki's older sister who has a carefree personality.
Nana Yanagi (柳 奈々, Yanagi Nana)
Kazuki's first love and the girlfriend of his best friend, Touji. A troublemaker at heart, but also incredibly frail and insecure. Mysteriously vanished one day.
Touji Kijima (生島 統司, Kijima Touji)
Kazuki's best friends during middle school, and the boyfriend of Nana Yanagi. Mysteriously vanished one day.
Miyuki Karino (苅野 実柚紀, Karino Miyuki)
A girl who attended the same middle school as Koudai, Kokone, Daiya, and Haruaki.

== Media ==
=== Light novels ===
The light novels were written by Eiji Mikage with illustrations done by Tetsuo. The first volume was released in January 2009 under ASCII Media Works imprint Dengeki Bunko and the novels concluded with the seventh volume in June 2015. The series was licensed by English publisher Yen Press in 2016.

No.	Original release date	Original ISBN	English release date	English ISBN
1	January 10, 2009	978-4-04-867461-4	October 31, 2017	978-0-31-656110-5
Kazuki Hoshino is trapped in the Rejecting Classroom - an odd occurrence that loops a couple of days and erases everyone's memories after every loop. He unintentionally catches the attention of transfer student Aya Otonashi when he identifies her as Maria, to his own surprise. She assumes he is the creator of the Rejecting Classroom, because nobody else should be able to recall incidents from previous loops, but he knows nothing about it. She mentally pressures him to give it up, but he doesn't believe her until he witnesses a death and retains his memories into another loop. At the same time, he also begins to wonder just how and when he fell in love with his crush Kasumi Mogi and realizes it was inside one of these loops. His friend, Haruaki Usui, also seems to have disappeared from this loop. He and Aya end up confronting Mogi about the box and this situation. Mogi admits she unintentionally created the Rejecting Classroom after being run over in an accident and regretting not being able to convey her feelings to Kazuki, who she had fallen in love with because he saw through her fake cheerful persona. Over the thousands and thousands of repeated cycles, she changes herself over and over to suit his preferences. Eventually, Kazuki returns her feelings, but the Box doesn't end. Over and over, eventually she stops even trying, but his residual feelings still exist and he begins confessing to her. She refuses to end the Box, though, because that would lead to her death. The best solution for her would be to kill him, kicking him out of her world. But, during the confrontation, his sincerity in not wanting to leave her alone causes her to kill herself. The Rejecting Classroom doesn't end, and they eventually confront O, who was taking the guise of Haruaki and manipulating Mogi and pushing her closer to despair every loop. All for the sake of messing with Kazuki, who was the only person to ever reject a Box given to him. Kazuki gets one final confrontation with Mogi, where he convinces her to relinquish her box. In the real world, he visits her in the hospital and, luckily, it looks like she'll live. Aya then transfers into his class one final time, as O had stated he would stick around to continue messing with Kazuki.
2	September 10, 2009	978-4-04-868012-7	February 27, 2018	978-0-31-656111-2
Riko Asami, a timid girl, as well as a fan of Aya, despises her life and has an ambition to replace Kazuki, who is the one closest to the Maria. Upon doing so, she obtains the Box "Week in the Mud". Gradually, she possesses Kazuki's body for an increasing amount of time with each day. Her brother, Ryuu Miyazaki, helps her do this by setting up situations where they can ruin Kazuki's life when he is possessed. Daiya Oomine, in the midst of it, had gotten immensely protective of Kokone Kirino when Kazuki, who was possessed, intentionally yet unintentionally confessed to her. Unfortunately, none of Kazuki's feelings from the Rejecting Classroom remain. Those were memories that he can view objectively, but he can't feel them. Eventually, it's revealed that Riko is Ryuu Miyazaki's sister, having a divorced mother and a new father-in-law. Because she was in such despair, she and her brother, Ryuu Miyazaki, killed their mother and her new lover. Later, she wanted to replace Kazuki as the one who is most close to Maria and obtains the Box, "Week in the Mud". However, the siblings realize they still have each other despite their torn family. Riko willingly gives up the Box, and Miyazaki is sentenced to prison for murder. After Kazuki arrives back to "normal", it is revealed that Daiya also knew about O as well, ending the novel with a cliffhanger.
3	January 10, 2010	978-4-04-868275-6	July 3, 2018	978-0-31-656113-6
The third novel picks up with Daiya introducing himself as Kazuki's enemy.
4	June 10, 2010	978-4-04-868595-5	October 30, 2018	978-0-31-656114-3
5	July 10, 2012	978-4-04-886733-7	February 19, 2019	978-0-31-656117-4
6	January 10, 2013	978-4-04-891251-8	June 18, 2019	978-0-31-656119-8
7	June 10, 2015	978-4-04-865193-6	November 5, 2019	978-0-31-656121-1

=== Music ===
The Empty Box and Zeroth Maria has two main theme songs: the opening theme "Zero ni Todoke" (ゼロに届け, Reaching the Zeroth) and the ending theme "Ryōkiteki na Eien" (猟奇的な永遠, Bizarre Eternity). Both songs were written by Eiji Mikage, sung by En and composed by Kei Fujimiya. They were released on April 26, 2015, by Replicaletter.

== Notes and references ==
Notes

Attribution

1. This article incorporates material derived from the "Empty Box and the Zeroth Maria" article on the Manga wiki at Fandom (formerly Wikia) and is licensed under the Creative Commons Attribution-Share Alike 3.0 License (April 2016).
2. This article incorporates material derived from the "Volume 2" article on the Hakomari wiki at Fandom (formerly Wikia) and is licensed under the Creative Commons Attribution-Share Alike 3.0 License (December 2016).
