= Taishang Huang =

Ancient Chinese title of a retired emperor

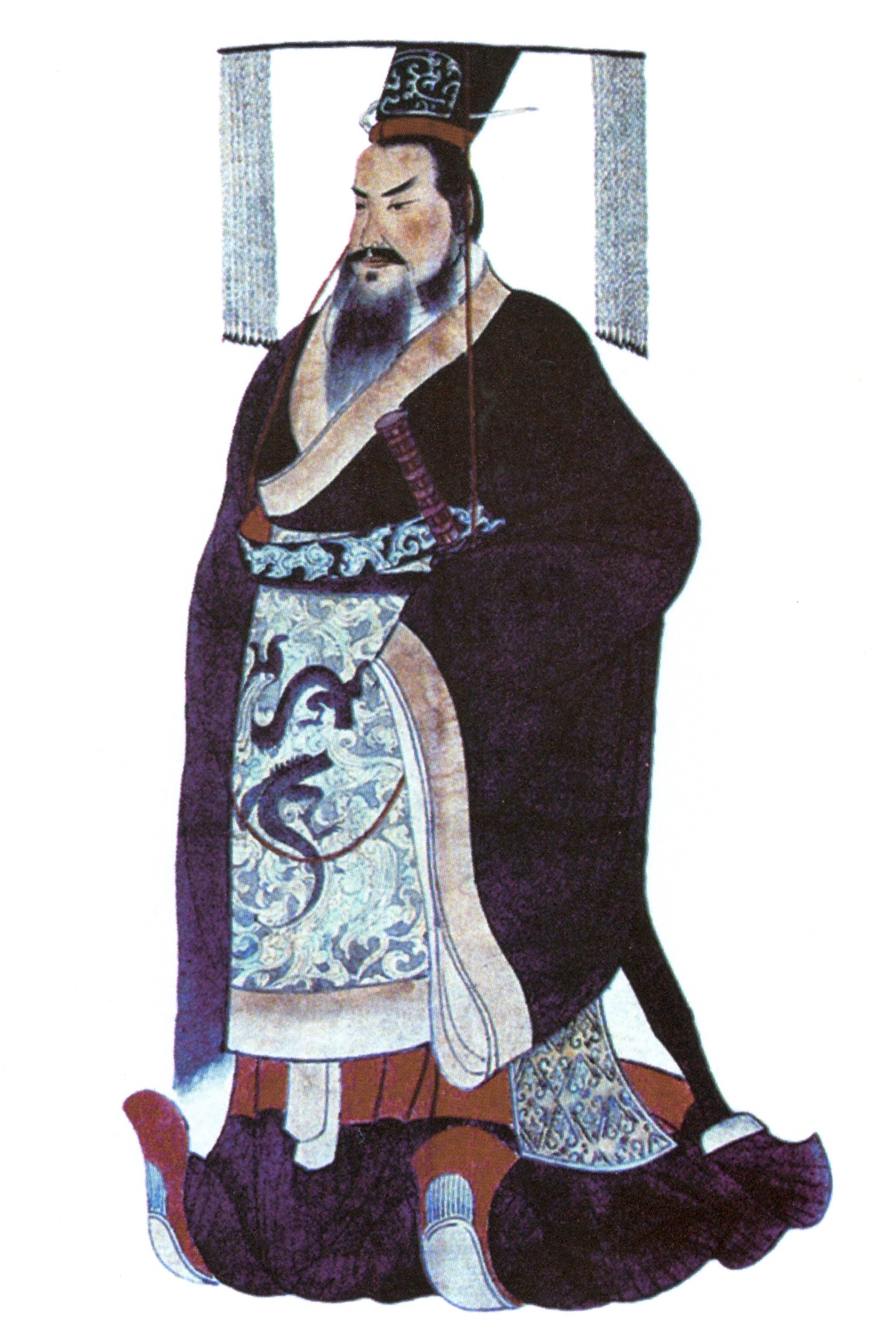
- The honorific was first bestowed by Qin Shi Huang (depicted) to his deceased father King Zhuangxiang of Qin.
- Chinese: 太上皇
Transcriptions
Standard Mandarin
- Hanyu Pinyin: Tàishàng Huáng
- Wade–Giles: T'ai4-shang4 Huang2
Yue: Cantonese
- Jyutping: taai3 soeng6 wong4

Alternative Chinese name
- Chinese: 太上皇帝
Transcriptions
Standard Mandarin
- Hanyu Pinyin: Tàishàng Huángdì
Yue: Cantonese
- Jyutping: taai3 soeng6 wong4 dai3

In Chinese history, a Taishang Huang or Taishang Huangdi is an honorific and institution of a retired emperor. The former emperor had, at least in name, abdicated in favor of someone else. Although no longer the reigning sovereign, there are instances where the retired emperor became a power behind the throne, often exerting more power than the reigning emperor.

== History ==
=== Origin ===
The title Taishang Huangdi was first used when Qin Shi Huangdi bestowed it upon his deceased father, King Zhuangxiang.

=== Development ===
Emperor Gaozu of Han bestowed the title Taishang Huangdi on his father Liu Taigong who was still alive. He bestowed it as an act of filial piety. It was intended to preserve the social hierarchy between father and son, as the former was a commoner and the latter was a dynastic founder.

In 301, during the War of the Eight Princes, Sima Lun forced his puppet Emperor Hui of Jin to assume the role of the Taishang Huang and seized the emperorship for himself. The title had strictly served as an honorific, but it became a tool of political infighting during this incident.

In 399, Lü Guang of Later Liang abdicated. He was old and gravely ill, so he wished to secure the transition of imperial power to his designated heir, the eldest son from his main consort, in the presence of another son who was older and posed a threat to the legitimate succession. He therefore used imperial retirement as a method to secure succession, which was the earliest example of such usage, even though the effort did not succeed in its purpose.

During the Northern and Southern dynasties, northern non-Han regimes employed this institution as a strategy to cast away from their tradition of horizontal succession in favor of the Han tradition of male primogeniture succession. In contrast, due to their Han heritage, the southern regimes had no need to make use of the institution as a means to stabilize successions and never employed the institution in this manner.

In 617, Li Yuan (later Emperor Gaozu of Tang) bestowed the title Taishang Huang upon Emperor Yang of Sui in absentia. He used the honorific as a legitimating cover for his seizure of power, in which Yang You was installed as his puppet emperor. In 626, during the Xuanwu Gate Incident, Prince Li Shimin led his armed forces in a coup for the Tang imperial throne. He succeeded in killing his rival brothers, Crown Prince Li Jiancheng and Prince Li Yuanji. Within three days, he was designated as the heir by his father Emperor Gaozu. Later that year, Emperor Gaozu abdicated in favor for his son Li Shimin (later Emperor Taizong of Tang). He remained as Taishang Huang until his death in 635.

=== Modern usage ===
In modern Chinese history, the title Taishang Huang has been used to informally describe officials such as Deng Xiaoping, Chen Yun, and Jiang Zemin.

== See also ==
- Retired Emperor (disambiguation)
- Daijō Tennō, the adaption of this concept in Japan
- Taesangwang, the adaption of this concept in Korea
