= Prince Sawara =

Japanese prince (c. 750 – 785)

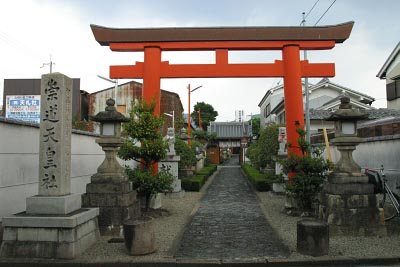
The Shinto shrine of Emperor Sudō

Prince Sawara (早良親王, Sawara-shinnō) (circa 750 – November 8, 785) was the fifth son of Prince Shirakabe (later Emperor Kōnin), by Takano no Niigasa.

== Biography ==
In 781 he was named heir-presumptive after his elder brother succeeded the abdicated Emperor Kōnin as the Emperor Kanmu. In 785, the administrator in charge of the new capital of Nagaoka-kyō, Fujiwara no Tanetsugu, was assassinated. Prince Sawara was implicated because of his opposition to the move of the capital, exiled to Awaji Province, but starved himself (although a mystery remains) and died on the way there.

He was made a Crown Prince by the Emperor Kanmu after his wife died and his son fell ill (the son allegedly possessed by the spirit of Sawara). Later that year, he was elevated posthumously to become Emperor Sudō (崇道天皇, Sudō-tennō). This is the then only recorded instance of posthumously raising someone to the rank and title of emperor. He was reburied in Yamato.

Additional concerns led to the decision to move the capital again, to Heiankyō (Kyōto).

He was also made part of pantheon of onryō, "disgraced" figures enshrined at the Shinsenen in Kyōto, in 863, to appease (rather than banish) troubled, even vengeful, souls. The others were Mononobe no Moriya (killed 587), Prince Iyo (executed 807), Fujiwara no Nakanari (executed 810), Tachibana no Hayanari (died 842) and Bunya no Miyatamaro (died 843).

The kami of Prince Sawara is venerated at Sudō jinja in Shūgaku-in, Yamashiro province. The prince (Sawara-shinnō) was posthumously elevated as Emperor Sudō (Sudō-tennō).
