= Prince Takaoka =

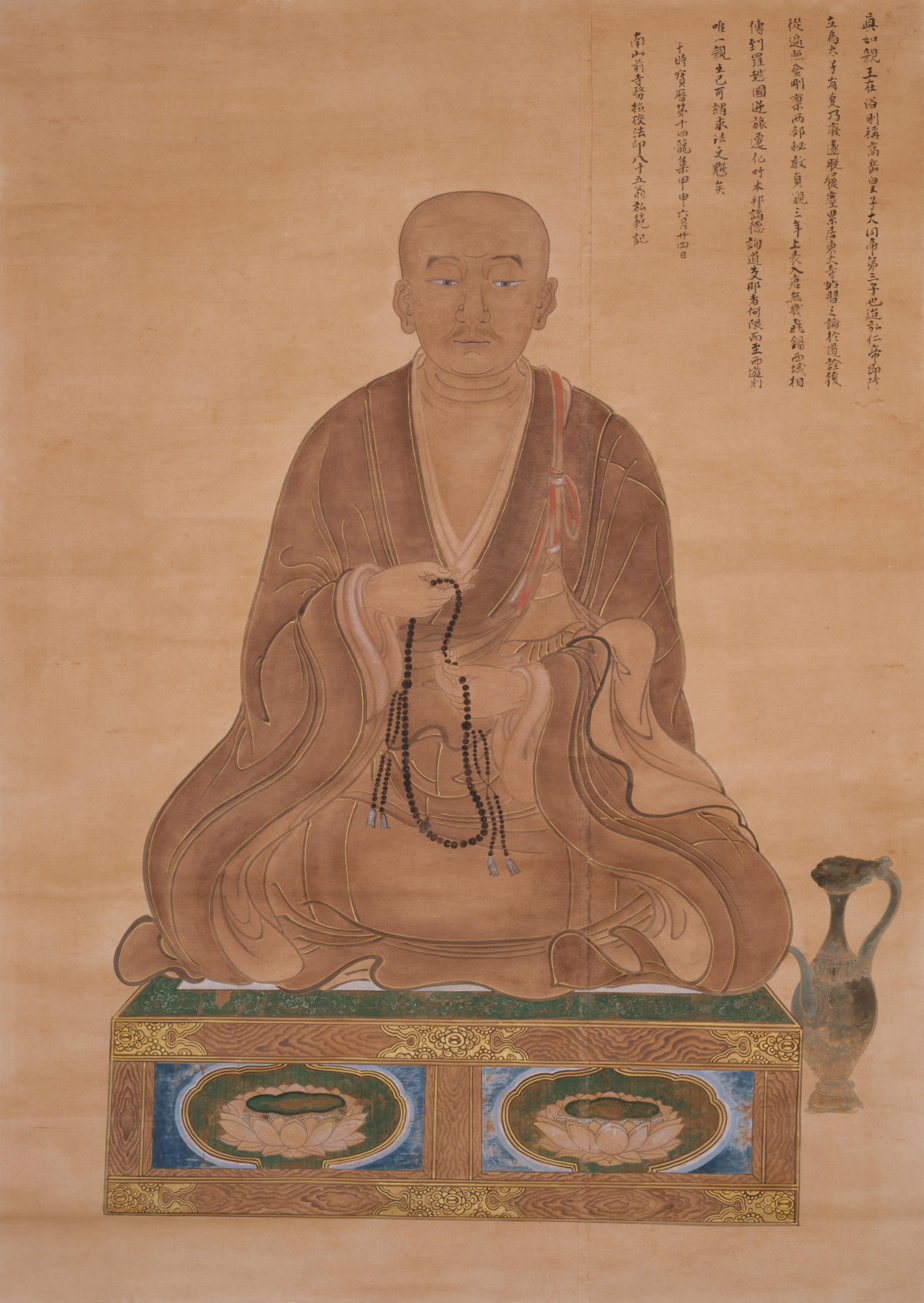

Crown Prince of Japan
- Reign: 809-810
- Born: 799; Heian-kyō, Japan
- Died: 865? Malay Peninsula
- Issue: Ariwara no Yoshifuchi; Ariwara no Yasusada
- Japanese: 高岳親王
- House: Imperial House of Japan
- Dynasty: Yamato dynasty
- Father: Emperor Heizei
- Mother: Ise no Tsugiko
- Religion: Shingon Buddhism

Imperial Prince Takaoka (高岳 親王, Takaoka Shinnō; 799 – 865?) was a member of the Japanese Imperial family and a Buddhist monk during the early Heian period. The third son of Emperor Heizei, he was named crown prince under Heizei's younger brother and successor Emperor Saga, but was deposed in the aftermath of the Kusuko Incident. Thereafter he took up monkhood and devoted himself to Buddhism. Takaoka is remembered as one of Kūkai's "Ten Great Disciples," and is famous for his travels to China and his attempt to reach India in his final years. A heavily fictionalized account of Prince Takaoka's attempt to reach India served as the basis of Tatsuhiko Shibusawa's Yomiuri Prize-winning 1987 novel Takaoka's Travels.

== Early life ==
In 809, Emperor Heizei fell ill, and fearing that his illness was the doing of the vengeful ghosts of his deceased relatives, chose to abdicate the throne to prevent calamity from befalling the realm. Heizei's favorite consort, Fujiwara no Kusuko, and her older brother, Fujiwara no Nakanari, strongly opposed this decision, but Heizei refused to back down, and ten days later his brother, Crown Prince Kamino, took the throne as Emperor Saga. As part of this arrangement, Saga appointed Heizei's third son Prince Takaoka as crown prince.

However by early 810, Heizei fully recovered from his illness and seemed to regret his abdication. He and his family, including Prince Takaoka, relocated to the old capital of Heijō-kyō, closer to the base of power of his consort's powerful Fujiwara clan. Heizei set up a rival court as retired emperor, and began issuing imperial edicts. The simmering conflict came to a head when Heizei issued an edict ordering the capital be moved back to Heijō-kyō. When Saga resisted, Heizei and Kusuko raised an army and marched on Heian-kyō, but were defeated by forces loyal to Saga, in what became known as the Kusuko Incident. Thereafter, Heizei shaved his head and became a Buddhist monk, Kusuko committed suicide by poison, and Takaoka was stripped of his court rank and removed as crown prince.

== Buddhist monk ==
Over time, an official narrative was promulgated holding Heizei innocent for the Kusuko incident and placing all blame on Kusuko and her Fujiwara relatives. Takaoka, who was still a boy at the time of the incident, was also deemed blameless and had his honor restored in 822, when he was granted fourth rank in the court. However, Takaoka decided to reject a return to court and instead opted to train as a Buddhist monk, adopting the Buddhist name Shinnyo (真如). He practiced asceticism as the disciple of the monks Shūei and Shūen in Nara, and later became one of the leading disciples of Kūkai on Mount Kōya, later to be remembered as one of Kūkai's "Ten Great Disciples" (十大弟子). Kūkai ultimately granted him the rank of Ajari ("master" in esoteric Buddhism), and Takaoka established the Shingon subtemple of Shinnō-in on Mount Kōya. When Kūkai died in 835, Takaoka attended his funeral as one of his leading disciples.

In 855, when the head of the Great Buddha at Todaiji temple in Nara fell off during an earthquake, Takaoka was appointed Inspector of the Great Buddha and took charge of the repair work.

In his sixties, Takaoka applied to the Imperial Court for permission to travel to Tang China to further his understanding of Buddhism. In 861, Takaoka and a retinue of 22 others traveled from Nara to the Kōrokan in northern Kyushu. In 862, they set sail and arrived in Ningbo to begin the long overland journey by foot to the Tang capital at Chang'an (present day Xi'an in western China).

Finally arriving at Chang'an in 864, Takaoka and his retinue were welcomed by the Saimyōji temple thanks to arrangements made by Ensai, a Japanese monk who had been studying Buddhism in China for nearly 30 years. However, Buddhism was in decline in Tang China at that time, due to Emperor Wuzong's policy of suppressing Buddhism, and Takaoka was unable to find a suitable teacher in Chang'an. Accordingly, he decided to travel to Tenjiku (India) to further his knowledge of Buddhist law and doctrine.

Having obtained the Tang Emperor's permission to travel to India, Takaoka departed Chang'an in 865, accompanied by 3 attendants, but after boarding a ship bound for Southeast Asia in Guangzhou, was never heard from again.

Sixteen years later, in 881, a report was received by Japanese monks studying in China that Prince Takaoka had died of illness in the kingdom of Luoyue (羅越), now generally presumed to have been located at the southern tip of the Malay Peninsula. Oral tradition in Japanese Buddhist circles later held that Takaoka had been attacked and eaten by a tiger.

== Legacy ==
Prince Takaoka's two sons by unknown wives or consorts, Ariwara no Yoshifuchi and Ariwara no Yasusada, became the founding members of the Ariwara clan.

The Shinnō-in temple established by Takaoka on Mt. Kōya remains a major temple of Shingon Buddhism and houses a number of Buddhist sculptures and artifacts classed as Important Cultural Properties.

A memorial tower for Prince Takaoka stands in the Japanese cemetery in Johor Bahru, Malaysia, constructed of granite stones brought from Japan at the behest of the Shinnō-in temple on Mount Kōya.

Takaoka's failed attempt to travel to India and alleged consumption by a tiger served as the basis for Tatsuhiko Shibusawa's Takaoka's Travels, a highly fictionalized novel which was awarded the Yomiuri Prize in 1987.
