= Hitoshi Ikebe =

Japanese painter

- Born: 3 March 1886; Tokyo, Japan
- Died: 17 December 1969 (aged 83); Tokyo, Japan
- Occupation: Painter

Hitoshi Ikebe (池部 鈞, Ikebe Hitoshi; 3 March 1886 – 17 December 1969) was a Japanese painter. His work was part of the painting event in the art competition at the 1932 Summer Olympics.
