= Eiji Maruo =

Japanese baseball player

- Pitcher
- Born: April 26, 1972 (age 54)
- Batted: Right Threw: Right

NPB debut
- 1995, for the Orix BlueWave

Last appearance
- 2000, for the Osaka Kintetsu Buffaloes

NPB statistics
- Win–loss record: 1-0
- ERA: 4.46
- Strikeouts: 54
- Stats at Baseball Reference

Teams
- Orix BlueWave (1995, 1997–1998); Osaka Kintetsu Buffaloes (2000)

Eiji Maruo (丸尾 英司, born April 26, 1976) is a Japanese former professional baseball pitcher in Japan's Nippon Professional Baseball. He played with the Orix BlueWave in 1995 and from 1997 to 1998, and the Osaka Kintetsu Buffaloes in 2000.
