= Eiji Mikage =

Japanese novelist

- 御影瑛路
- Born: July 27, 1983 (age 43)
- Education: Nihon University Department of Science and Engineering (Dropped Out)
- Occupation: Novelist
- Writing career
- Language: Japanese
- Period: 2005 –
- Genres: Light novel, mystery
- Notable works: Kamisu Reina series The Empty Box and Zeroth Maria series
- Notable awards: 11th Dengeki Novel Prize Shortlisting Contender

Eiji Mikage (御影瑛路, Mikage Eiji; born July 27, 1983) is a Japanese novelist.

With the aim of becoming a writer, he dropped out of Nihon University's Department of Science and Engineering while writing his novel Bokura wa Dokonimo Hirakanai (僕らはどこにも開かない), which he would debut with after it shortlisted in the 11th Dengeki Novel Prize. He states that the film Memento influenced him back in high school to start writing.

== Works ==
=== Novels ===
- Bokura wa Dokonimo Hirakanai (僕らはどこにも開かない) (Published by Dengeki Bunko, May 2005, ISBN 4-8402-3040-4)
- Kamisu Reina series (神栖麗奈シリーズ) (Published by Dengeki Bunko, 2 volumes, 2005–2006)
- The Empty Box and Zeroth Maria series (空ろの箱と零のマリアシリーズ, Utsuro no Hako to Zero no Maria) (Illustrated by Tetsuo (415), published by Dengeki Bunko, 7 volumes, 2009–2015)
- Anata ga Naku made Fumu no o Yamenai! series (あなたが泣くまで踏むのをやめない!シリーズ) (Illustrated by nyanya, published by Dengeki Bunko, 2 volumes, 2011–2012)
- F Rank no Bōkun series (Fランクの暴君シリーズ) (Illustrated by Sunao Minakata, published by Dengeki Bunko, 2 volumes, 2013)
- Bokura wa Mahōshōjo no Naka series (僕らは魔法少女の中シリーズ) (Illustrated by Eihi, published by Dengeki Bunko, 2 volumes, 2014)
- Koisuru Satsujin Audition (恋する殺人オーディション) (Published by Media Works Bunko, March 2016, ISBN 978-4-04-865588-0)
- Bokura wa Dokonimo Hirakanai‐There are no facts, only interpretations.‐ (僕らはどこにも開かない‐There are no facts, only interpretations.‐) (Revised edition, illustrated by Yoshitoshi ABe, published by Dengeki Bunko, November 2016, ISBN 978-4-04-892488-7)
- Masquerade and the Nameless Women (殺人鬼探偵の捏造美学, Satsujinki Tantei no Netsuzō Bigaku) (Published by Kodansha Taiga, November 2017, ISBN 978-4-06-294096-2) (English version: Published by Vertical, January 2019, ISBN 978-1947194380)
- Ritatekina Marie (利他的なマリー) (Illustrated by Ako Arisaka, published by Dengeki Bunko, March 2019, ISBN 978-4-04-912269-5)

=== Short stories ===
- Rōsankata Shōjo, Hatsune Rei (量産型彼女、初音レイ) (Dengeki Collaboration Fuyukoi -Kanojotachi no Ienai Jijō-) (Published in Dengeki Bunko Magazine, January 2014 edition)
- Buji Joshi ni Furareru, Natsu (無事女子にフラれる、夏) (Published in Short Stories Boku to Kimi no 15 Centimeters, October 2017, ISBN 978-4-04-734747-2)
