= Eiji Uehiro =

Japanese ethicist and social educator (1937–2019)

- 上廣 榮治
- Uehiro aged 74
- Born: 6 June 1937; Kumamoto Prefecture, Japan
- Died: 11 January 2019 (aged 81); Shibuya, Tokyo, Japan
- Occupations: Ethicist; social educator; writer
- Known for: Founding the Uehiro Foundation on Ethics and Education and Oxford Uehiro Centre for Practical Ethics

Eiji Uehiro (上廣 榮治, Uehiro Eiji; 6 June 1937 – 11 January 2019) was a Japanese ethicist, social educator, and writer. He founded the Uehiro Foundation on Ethics and Education in 1987 and the Oxford Uehiro Centre for Practical Ethics in 2003.

== Early life and education ==
Uehiro was born in Kumamoto Prefecture on 6 June 1937. In 1960, he graduated from the Faculty of Law at Chuo University.

== Career ==
Uehiro established the Uehiro Foundation on Ethics and Education in 1987. The foundation later became a partner of the Carnegie Council for Ethics in International Affairs. According to Carl B. Becker, the foundation was influenced by Uehiro's father, Tetsuhiko Uehiro, a survivor of the atomic bombing of Hiroshima, who had founded a traditional ethics organisation in Japan. Uehiro considered that organisation insufficiently universal or international in scope.

In 2002, Uehiro established the Uehiro Chair in Practical Ethics at the University of Oxford. This was followed in 2003 by the formation of the Oxford Uehiro Centre for Practical Ethics.

== Recognition ==
Uehiro received the Medal with Blue Ribbon from the Emperor of Japan in 1997 for his work in ethical education. In 2016, he received the Order of the Rising Sun, 3rd class.

== English publications ==
- Uehiro, Eiji (2012). Practical Ethics for Our Time. Translated by Becker, Carl. Tuttle Publishing. ISBN 978-1-4629-0480-8.
