= Hōen =

Period of Japanese history (1135-1141 AD)

Hōen (保延) was a Japanese era name (年号, nengō; lit. "year name") after Chōshō and before Eiji. This period spanned the years from September 1135 through July 1141. The reigning emperor was Sutoku-tennō (崇徳天皇).

== Change of Era ==
- February 15, 1035 Hōen gannen (保延元年): The new era name Hōen was created to mark an event or a series of events. The previous era ended and the new one commenced in Chōshō 4, on the 27th day of the 4th month of 1135.

== Events of the Hōen Era ==
- 1136 (Hōen 2, 3rd month): The former-Emperor Toba hosted a grand dinner party.
- 1136 (Hōen 2, 5th month): The sadaijin Fujiwara Ieyetada died at age 75.
- 1136 (Hōen 2, 12th month): The udaijin Minamoto no Arihito was named sadaijin; and the naidaijin Fujiwara Munetada was named udaijin.
- 1136 (Hōen 2, 12th month): Fujiwara Yorinaga was appointed Minister of the Center (naidaijin) at the age of 17.
- 1138 (Hōen 4, 2nd month): The udaijin Munetada shaved his head at age 77; and he became a Buddhist priest.
- 1138 (Hōen 4, 9th month): The former-Emperor Toba went to Mount Hiei, where he stayed for seven days.
- May 2, 1140 (Hōen 6, 14th day of the 4th month): The priests of the Buddhist temples on Mount Hiei banded together to burn down the Mii-dera again.

== Notes ==
| Preceded by Chōshō | Era or nengō Hōen; 1135–1138 | Succeeded by Eiji |
