= Eiji Oki =

Eiji Oki (大木 英司, Ōki Eiji) from the University of Electro-Communications, Chofu, Tokyo, Japan was named Fellow of the Institute of Electrical and Electronics Engineers in 2013 for contributions to high-performance packet switching and path computation technologies.
