= Retired Emperor =

A retired emperor or emperor emeritus, in East Asia, is an emperor who is no longer in power. It may be used as a title.

It may refer to:

- Taishang Huang, China
- Daijō Tennō, Jōkō, or Emperor Emeritus, Japan
  - Akihito, abdicated 2019
- Taesangwang, Korea
- Thái thượng hoàng, Vietnam
