= Fujiwara no Kusuko =

Fujiwara no Kusuko (藤原 薬子) (–October 13, 810) was a Japanese court lady. She is best known for her role in the Kusuko Incident.

== Early life ==
Kusuko was the daughter of Fujiwara no Tanetsugu. She was known for her beauty. After her father's assassination in 785, she married Fujiwara no Tadanushi and bore three sons and two daughters. One of those daughters was invited to become a consort for Emperor Heizei, which brought Kusuko to court. When she reached court, Kusuko earned Heizei's favor and became his consort. She became the Naishi-no-kami (内侍) and entered court politics.

== Kusuko incident ==
The Kusuko incident can also be called the "Retired Emperor Heizei Incident". After Emperor Heizei abdicated the throne in 809, a decision that Kusuko and her brother Fujiwara no Nakanari opposed, his brother Emperor Saga took the throne. However, Heizei was displeased with some changes that Saga made, and used Kusuko's position as the Naishi-no-kami (内侍) to make imperial decrees. Many of these edicts were fueled by Kusuko's advice, because she wanted to return to the level of power she had when he was emperor. A rivalry formed between Heizei and Saga's courts, culminating in Heizei deciding to change the country's capital to Heijō-kyō, where his court was based. Saga vetoed this and stripped Kusuko of her position, removing Heizei's ability to make imperial decrees.

Heizei decided to gather an army and move against Saga. He and Kusuko made it to Yamato province before they realized the strength of Saga's forces and decided to return to Heijō-kyō. When they returned, Kusuko committed suicide by drinking poison.

A mention of that incident as well as some mostly fictionalized accounts of Fujiwara no Kusuko is contained in Takaoka Shinnō Kōkai ki (高丘親王航海記, Record of Prince Takaoka's voyages, 1987) by Tatsuhiko Shibusawa.
