= Eiji Kiyokawa =

Japanese baseball player (1961–2024)

- Pitcher
- Born: September 21, 1961; Kyoto, Japan
- Died: May 5, 2024 (aged 62); Tokyo, Japan
- Batted: Left Threw: Left

NPB debut
- October 8, 1984, for the Hiroshima Toyo Carp

Last appearance
- August 9, 1998, for the Hiroshima Toyo Carp

NPB statistics (through 1998)
- Win–loss record: 13-10
- Earned Run Average: 2.94
- Strikeouts: 375
- Saves: 12
- Stats at Baseball Reference

Teams
- As player: Hiroshima Toyo Carp (1984–1991, 1998); Kintetsu Buffaloes (1991–1997); As coach: Hiroshima Toyo Carp (1999–2006); Orix Buffaloes (2007–2012); Saitama Seibu Lions (2014–2017, 2019–2023)
- Last updated on: 13 May 2024

Eiji Kiyokawa (清川 栄治, Kiyokawa Eiji; September 21, 1961 – May 5, 2024) was a Japanese Nippon Professional Baseball player and coach who played as a pitcher. He died from cancer on May 5, 2024, at the age of 62.
