= Eiji Yoshikawa (boxer) =

Japanese Boxer

Eiji Yoshikawa, also known by the title of "The Compassionate Pugilist," is a Japanese boxer, coach, author, documentarian and peace educator.

== Life ==
Yoshikawa was born in Japan in Shikoku, growing up in a Buddhist temple with his grandfather who was a monk. He attended university in Tokyo for French literature, and began training in boxing around the same time. In 1984, he set out for New York to learn English at Columbia SPS.

He has taught world champions such as Manny Pacquiao, and will teach anyone willing to learn from him, firmly believing in boxing as a form of self improvement. Yoshikawa continues to teach through the sport of boxing "as a way to teach young people about peace and the importance of following their dreams," giving lectures and lessons for all ages through an estimated 800 speeches in schools across the world.

== Charity ==
Yoshikawa has performed charity work such as aiding in the rescue and recovery efforts of the September 11 attacks, funding the purchase of tricycle taxis, donating fight proceeds to the Philippines, buying Christmas gifts for families who cannot afford them, and teaching seniors how to box in the "Outfight Parkinson" program.

135-pound Yoshikawa has notably fought the Canadian welterweight champion Robert Couzens despite the weight and height difference between them. Couzens described him as a "very determined, kind person".
