= Eiji Mikawa =

Japanese businessperson and rugby player

Eiji Mikawa (美川 英二, Mikawa Eiji; 17 August 1933 – 19 June 1999) was a Japanese businessperson and rugby player, who played for the Japan national rugby union team in the 1950s. He worked for Yokogawa Electric from 1956 and became company president in 1993.

== Life and career ==
Mikawa was born on 17 August 1933 in what is now Suita, Osaka, where he graduated from Suita Municipal Senri Elementary School No. 2. He then attended Keio Senior High School in Yokohama, where he became interested in rugby union. From 1952 he studied law at Keio University in Tokyo, where he joined the rugby team and became a member of the Japan national rugby union team. He played as a flanker.

Mikawa joined Yokogawa Electric in 1956. He became company director in 1976 and managing director in 1982. Around this time he was involved in negotiating joint ventures in Brazil. In 1983, as Managing Director he handled the company's merger with Hokushin Electric Works. In 1991 he became vice president of Yokogawa, and then president in June 1993. At the time he became president he had to deal with the recession that had hit Japan after the economic bubble in Japan burst in 1992, and in 1994 Yokogawa's operating income fell to 30% of what it had been in 1991.

Mikawa made the decision to take in 25 former employees (primarily those 36 and over) from Yamaichi Securities, which had gone out of business in November 1997.

In 1990, Mikawa launched an initiative to reinforce the Yokogawa Electric Soccer Club (now Tokyo Musashino City FC) with Brazilian coaches and players. He announced in January 1994 his intention to have the team join the Japan Football League.

Mikawa had a reputation for being energetic, and earn nicknames such as Same (鮫 "shark") and Raion (ライオン "lion"). He was married and had three sons. Mikawa died from bile duct cancer at a hospital in Shinjuku on 19 June 1999 at 13:10. A company funeral was held for him on 21 June.
