= Eiji Hamano =

Japanese photographer

Eiji Hamano (浜野 栄次, Hamano Eiji; 1923–1992) was a renowned Japanese photographer.
