= Fujiwara no Nakanari =

Japanese noble

Fujiwara no Nakanari 藤原仲成
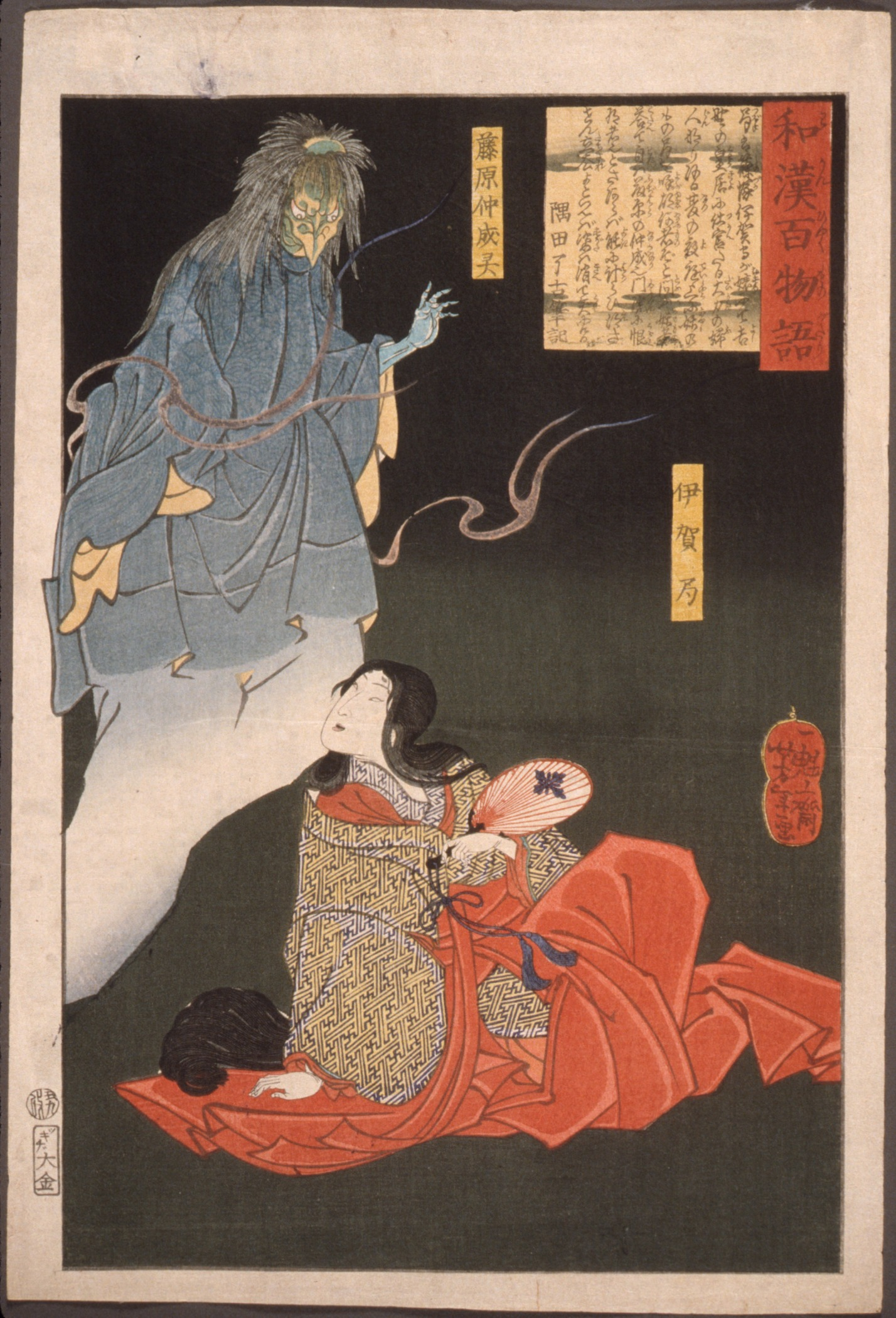
- Born: 764
- Died: October 16, 810
- Family: Fujiwara Shikike
- Father: Fujiwara no Tanetsugu

Fujiwara no Nakanari (藤原 仲成; 764 – October 16, 810) was a Japanese noble of the early Heian period. He was the eldest son of the chūnagon Fujiwara no Tanetsugu of the Fujiwara Shikike. He reached the court rank of ju shi-i no ge (従四位下) and sangi.

== Life ==
When Nakanari's father Tanetsugu was assassinated in 785, Nakanari was granted the rank of ju go-i no ge (従五位下) despite his youth. In Emperor Kanmu's court, he held various regional positions, as well as positions in the imperial guard and Daijō-kan. He was also promoted three times, culminating in the rank of ju shi-i no ge (従四位下) in 801.

In the court of Emperor Heizei, Nakanari's younger sister Kusuko was favored by the emperor, and Nakanari too was valued and boasted political power. Despite this, his treacherous and arbitrary actions made him unpopular. He may also have been involved in the Prince Iyo Incident of 807, in which Heizei's younger brother Prince Iyo was accused of leading a conspiracy and ultimately committed suicide, and after which Nakanari was promoted into more important positions. In 809 he was appointed as kansatsu-shi (観察使) of the Hokurikudō, a position roughly equivalent to sangi, thus joining the ranks of the kugyō.

Later that year, Heizei abdicated the throne in favor of his younger brother Emperor Saga. Nakanari and Kusuko, fearing the loss of their political influence, moved with him to Heijō-kyō and schemed for him to retake the throne, encouraging him to create an opposing court to Saga's in what became known as the Kusuko Incident. In 810, with the elimination of the kansatsu-shi system, Nakanari was moved into the equivalent rank of sangi. However, when Heizei ordered the return of the capital to Heijō-kyō that autumn, relations between the two courts worsened even further, and a few days later Nakanari was captured by Saga's side. He was confined and demoted to provisional governor of Sado Province, and the next day was executed by the archery of Ki no Kiyonari (紀清成) and Sumiyoshi no Toyotsugu (住吉豊継).

Nakanari's execution is held to be the last carried out by the central Japanese court until the Hōgen Rebellion of 1156. However, according to the scholar Masataka Uwayokote, because the method of execution used did not comply with the beheading or strangling options defined in the Yōrō Code, and because it happened after Nakanari was officially demoted, this execution may have been a personal command by the emperor rather than a formal execution under the Ritsuryō law.

== Personality ==
According to the Nihon Kōki, Nakanari was a man of strong desires, and some of his actions were taken under the influence of alcohol. He was heedless of his personal position among his relatives, and could not be dissuaded of anything. As his sister Kusuko's influence grew, he rode higher and higher on the wave of her power, causing deep affronts to the royalty and to virtuous men.

For example, Nakanari's wife's aunt was extremely beautiful, and he approached her, but when she refused him, he tried to take her by force. The aunt escaped to the protection of Prince Sami (佐味親王), but Nakanari invaded the house where the Prince and his mother lived. Spouting abusive language, he tied her up and raped her.

When Nakanari was killed, the general opinion was that he got what was coming to him.

== Genealogy ==
- Father: Fujiwara no Tanetsugu
- Mother: daughter of Awata no Michimaro (粟田道麻呂)
- Wife: daughter of Kasae no Hito (笠江人)
- Children:
  - Son: Fujiwara no Fujinushi (藤原藤主)
