= Eiji (era) =

Period of Japanese history (1141–1142 CE)

Eiji (永治) was a Japanese era name (年号, nengō; lit. "year name") after Hōen and before Kōji. This period spanned the year from July 1141 through April 1142. The reigning emperors were Sutoku-tennō (崇徳天皇) and Konoe-tennō (近衛天皇).

== Change of Era ==
- February 9, 1141 Eiji gannen (永治元年): The old era name was created to mark an event or series of events. The previous era ended and the old one commenced in Hōen 6, on the 10th day of the 7th month of 1141.

== Events of the Eiji Era ==
- 1141 (Eiji 1, 3rd month): The former Emperor Toba accepted the tonsure and became a Buddhist monk at the age of 27 years.
- January 5, 1142 (Eiji 1, 7th day of the 12th month): In the 18th year of Sutoku-tennō's reign (崇徳天皇18年), the emperor abdicated; and the succession (senso) was received by a younger brother, the 8th son of former Emperor Toba. Shortly thereafter, Emperor Konoe is said to have acceded to the Chrysanthemum Throne (sokui).

== Notes ==
Preceded by Hōen	Era or nengō Eiji; 1141–1142	Succeeded by Kōji
