= Kōwa (Heian period) =

Period of Japanese history (1099-1104 AD)

Kowa (康和) was a Japanese era name (年号, nengō; "year name") after Jōtoku and before Chōji. This period spanned the years from August 1099 through February 1104. The reigning emperor was Horikawa-tennō (堀河天皇).

== Change of Era ==
- January 24, 1099 Kōwa 1 (康和元年): The new era name was created to mark an event or series of events. The previous era ended and the new one commenced in Jōtoku 3, on the 28th day of the 8th month of 1099.

== Events of the Kōwa Era ==
- 1099 (Kōwa 1, 6th month): Kampaku Fujiwara no Moromichi died at age 38; and Moromichi's son, Fujiwara no Tadazane took over his father's responsibilities.
- 1100 (Kōwa 2): The dainagon, Fujiwara no Tadazane, is elevated to udaijin.
- 1101 (Kōwa 3, 2nd month): The former kampaku, Fujiwara no Morozane, died at age 60.

== Notes ==
Preceded by Jōtoku	Era or nengō Kōwa; 1099–1104	Succeeded by Chōji
