= Junbo-Ritsugō =

Japanese royal title for an honorary empress

Junbo-Ritsugō (准母立后)
- Creation date: 1091
- Creation: for Princess Yasuko, to refer to the honorary mother of the emperor
- First holder: Princess Yasuko (as adoptive mother of Emperor Horikawa)
- Last holder: Princess Shōshi (as honorary empress of Emperor Go-Daigo
- Present holder: None
- Subsidiary titles: None

Junbo-Ritsugō (Japanese: 准母立后 or 准母 (Junbo)), is a Japanese title referring to an honorary empress, or the honorary mother of the Japanese emperor.

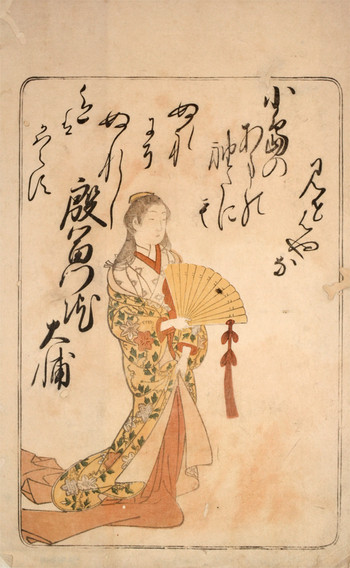
Princess Sukeko, the third Junbo-Ritsugō.

== Usage of the title ==
The title was used when the emperor needed an honorary empress to perform certain tasks. The title was only used ceremonially, typically by a female relative who was a previous empress. It could also be used for an honorary empress dowager, not just an honorary empress consort.

== History ==
The title first came to use in 1091. The former Saiō, Princess Yasuko, was made the honorary empress for her brother, Emperor Horikawa. It was odd for the empress to be her husband's sister, but she was actually Horikawa's nurse, and adoptive mother, and she would retire in 1093.

Yasuko was chosen as Horikawa's birth mother, Fujiwara no Kenshi, had died before Horikawa's ascension. It was customary for an emperor to take a palanquin to the enthronement hall to their enthronement. This was often difficult for a young emperor, who often rode with their mother's. However, the specific palanquin the emperor rode in was known as the soukaren, and could only be used by the emperor, empress, or saiō. But if the emperor's mother was either dead (like in this case), or not the main wife of a previous emperor (meaning she did not hold the title of empress consort, and later empress dowager), she could not ride with the emperor, which made it difficult for these child emperors. Thus, Princess Yasuko was chosen and the role was born out of a necessity for certain court functions.

== List ==
- Princess Yasuko – the nurse and adoptive mother of her younger brother. She retired from the position in 1093.
- Princess Reishi – appointed as honorary empress in 1108 to her nephew Emperor Toba. She served until she became a nun in 1130.
- Princess Muneko – honorary empress to her nephew, the Emperor Nijō. She retired when Emperor Nijō married and his wife Princess Yoshiko became empress.
- Princess Ryōshi – the only empress to be honorary empress twice, first as honorary mother to her nephew Emperor Antoku, and then to Emperor Go-Toba.
- Princess Noriko – honorary empress to her nephew, Emperor Tsuchimikado. She was a Saiin.
- Princess Shōshi (1195–1211) – honorary empress to her brother, Emperor Juntoku.
- Princess Kuniko – honorary empress to her brother, Emperor Go-Horikawa. She was also the surrogate mother of Emperor Kameyama, and served as honorary empress until she became a nun in 1235.
- Princess Rishi – honorary empress to her nephew, Emperor Shijō. She was first made his honorary empress, but then would later become his honorary mother. She would serve until 1239, when she became a nun, and was bestowed the Dharma name, Shinseichi. She was given the title, Shikiken Mon'in on the same day.
- Princess Teruko – honorary mother to her nephew, Emperor Go-Saga.
- Princess Shōshi (1286–1348) – briefly served as honorary empress for her brother, Emperor Go-Daigo, before becoming a nun the same year in 1319. She received the Dharma name Shinrikaku.

== See also ==
- Josei Tennō
- Empress of Japan
- Empress Michiko
