= Princess Tokushi =

Empress consort of Japan
- Tenure: 1093–1107
- Born: 1060
- Died: 1114 (aged 53–54)
- Spouse: Emperor Horikawa (m. 1093; died 1107)
- House: Imperial House of Japan
- Father: Emperor Go-Sanjō
- Mother: Kaoruko

Princess Tokushi (篤子内親王; 1060–1114 CE) (also Atsuko) was a princess and an empress consort of Japan. She was the consort of her nephew, Emperor Horikawa.

== Biography ==
She was the fourth daughter of Emperor Go-Sanjō and his cousin Imperial Princess Kaoruko. Additionally, she was the sister of Emperor Shirakawa.

Her father died in 1073 and was succeeded by her brother, Emperor Shirakawa. In 1087, Shirakawa abdicated, and appointed his young son, who was crowned Emperor Horikawa. This was against the wishes of the late Emperor Go-Sanjō, who had indicated that, after Shirakawa, the throne should pass to Shirakawa's brothers.

To ensure that his direct familial line retained power, and to avoid any chance for others to gain influence, in 1093 Shirakawa had his thirty-four-year-old sister Princess Tokushi married to his son, the thirteen-year-old Emperor.

Despite hopes and imperial prayers, the marriage did not result in children, and 1098 Emperor Horikawa took an additional wife, who gave birth to a crown prince (later Emperor Toba). Horikawa and Tokushi's court was known for fostering poetry and literature.

In 1107, Emperor Horikawa died, and Tokushi became a Buddhist nun.

== Notes ==
Japanese royalty
Preceded by Princess Yasuko	Empress consort of Japan; 1093–1107	Succeeded by Princess Reishi
