= List of Buddhist temples in Kyoto Prefecture =

There are 1,600 Buddhist temples scattered throughout the prefecture of Kyoto.

== Nara period in Kyoto (710-794) ==
- Saihō-ji (西芳寺, Saihō-ji), also known as Koke-dera (苔寺, Koke-dera) or Kōinzan Saihō-ji (洪隠山西芳寺, Kōinzan Saihō-ji).
- Otagi Nenbutsuji Temple

== Heian period in Kyoto (794-1229) ==
- Kōryū-ji (広隆寺, Kōryū-ji), also known as the "Uzamasa-dera" (太秦寺, Uzamasa-dera).
- Rokkaku-dō (六角堂, Rokkaku-dō).
- Adashino Nenbutsu-ji (化野念仏寺, Adashino Nenbutsu-ji).
- Kiyomizu-dera (清水寺, Kiyomizu-dera), formally identified as Otowa-san Kiyomizu-dera (音羽山清水寺, Otowa-san Kiyomizu-dera). — World Historical Heritage Site
- Enryaku-ji (延暦寺, Enryaku-ji). — World Historical Heritage Site
- Yamashiro Kokubun-ji (山城国分寺, Yamashiro Kokubun-ji).
- East Temple (東寺, Tō-ji), formally identified as Kyō-ō-gokoku-ji (教王護国寺, Kyō-ō-gokoku-ji).
  - West Temple (西寺, Sai-ji), destroyed in 1233 and never rebuilt.
- Daikaku-ji (大覚寺, Daikaku-ji).
- Ninna-ji (仁和寺, Ninna-ji). — World Historical Heritage Site
- Sennyū-ji (泉涌寺, Sennyū-ji).
- Gangyō-ji (元慶寺, Gangyō-ji), after 986 known more popularly as Kazan-ji (花山寺, Kazan-ji).
- Rokushō-ji (六勝寺, Rokushō-ji).
  - Hosshō-ji (法勝寺, Hosshō-ji).
  - Sonshō-ji (尊勝寺, Sonshō-ji).
  - Saishō-ji (最勝寺, Saishō-ji).
  - Enshō-ji (円勝寺, Enshō-ji).
  - Jōshō-ji (成勝寺, Jōshō-ji).
  - Enshō-ji (延勝寺, Enshō-ji).
- Daigo-ji (醍醐寺, Daigo-ji).
- Kajū-ji (勧修寺, Kajū-ji), also spelled Kwajū-ji.
- Nison-in (二村院, Nison-in), formally identified as Ogura-yama Nison-kyo-in Keidai-ji (小倉山 二尊教院 華台寺, Ogura-yama Nison-kyo-in Keidai-ji).
- Byōdō-in (平等院, Byōdō-in).
- Sanjūsangen-dō (三十三間堂, Sanjūsangen-dō).

== Hōjō in the Kamakura period in Kyoto (1221-1333) ==
- Kennin-ji (建仁寺, Kennin-ji).
- Tōfuku-ji (東福寺, Tōfuku-ji).
- Nanzen-ji (南禅寺, Nanzen-ji), formerly Eikan-dō Zenrin-ji (禅林寺, Zenrin-ji).
- Daitoku-ji (大徳寺, Daitoku-ji).
- Chion-in (知恩院, Chion-in).
- Ryūhon-ji.
- Bukkō-ji (佛光寺, Bukkō-ji).
- Nishi Otani Betsuin.

== Ashikaga in the Muromachi period in Kyoto (1333-1582) ==
- Tōjo-in.
- Tōjo-ji.
- Tenryū-ji (天龍寺, Tenryū-ji), formally identified as Tenryū Shiseizen-ji (天龍資聖禅寺, Tenryū Shiseizen-ji); formerly on same site in 9th century, Danrin-ji (檀林寺, Danrin-ji)
- Myōshin-ji (妙心寺, Myōshin-ji).
- Shōkoku-ji (相国寺, Shōkoku-ji), formally identified as Mannen-zan Shōkoku Shōten Zenji (萬年山相國承天禅寺, Mannen-zan Shōkoku Shōten Zenji).
- Kinkaku-ji (金閣寺, Kinkaku-ji) or the "Golden Pavilion Temple," formally identified as Rokuon-ji (鹿苑寺, Rokuon-ji).
- Ryōan-ji (竜安寺, Ryōan-ji).
- Ginkaku-ji (銀閣寺, Ginkaku-ji) or the "Temple of the Silver Pavilion," formally identified as Jishō-ji (慈照寺, Jishō-ji). — World Historical Heritage Site
- Honkoku-ji.
- Honnō-ji (本能寺, Honnō-ji).

== Azuchi-Momoyama period in Kyoto (1582-1615) ==
- Hompa Hongwan-ji.
- Ōtaniha Hongwan-ji.
- Hōkō-ji (方広寺, Hōkō-ji).
- Mimizuka.
- Kōdai-ji (高台寺, Kōdai-ji), formally identified as Jubuzan Kōdai-ji (鷲峰山高台寺, Jubuzan Kōdai-ji).
- Sambō-in.
- Nishi Hongan-ji (西本願寺, Nishi Hongan-ji).
- Higashi Hongan-ji (東本願寺, Higashi Hongan-ji).

== Edo period in Kyoto (1615-1869) ==
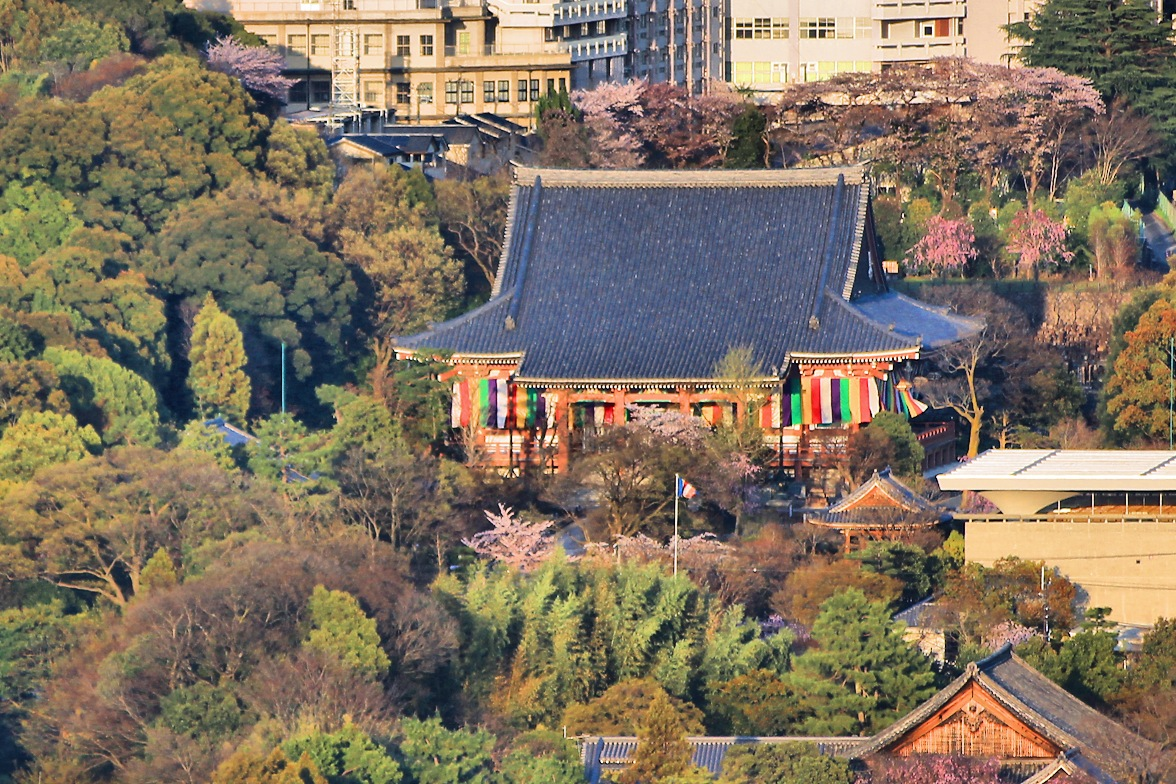
Chishaku-in

- Shōgo-in ( (聖護院)
- Chishaku-in.
- Reikan-ji.
- Reigen-ji.
- Yentsū-ji.
- Rinkyū-ji.

== See also ==
- List of Shinto shrines in Kyoto
- Thirteen Buddhist Sites of Kyoto
