= Enshō-ji =

Enshō-ji may refer to:

- Enshō-ji (Antei) (円勝寺), a Buddhist temple complex in Kyoto, Japan founded by Imperial consort Taikenmon'in in 1128.
- Enshō-ji (Kenchō) (延勝寺), a Buddhist temple complex in Kyoto founded by Emperor Konoe in 1149.
- Enshō-ji (Nara) (円照寺), a Buddhist temple complex in Nara founded by Queen Bunchi, consort of Emperor Go-Mizunoo, in 1656.
