= Jōryaku =

Period of Japanese history (1077–1081 CE)

Jōryaku (承暦) was a Japanese era name (年号, nengō, lit. year name) after Jōhō and before Eihō. This period spanned the years from November 1077 through February 1081. The reigning emperor was Emperor Shirakawa-tennō (白河天皇).

== Change of Era ==
- January 27, 1077 Jōryaku gannen (承暦元年): The new era name was created to mark an event or series of events. The previous era ended and the new one commenced in Jōhō 4, on the 17th day of the 11th month of 1077.

== Events of the Jōryaku Era ==
- 1077 (Jōryaku 1, 1st month): Shirakawa went to the Kamo Shrines; and he visited Kiyomizu-dera and other Buddhist temples.
- 1077 (Jōryaku 1, 2nd month): Udaijin Minamoto no Morofusa died of an ulcer at the age of 70.
- 1077 (Jōryaku 1): The emperor caused Hosshō-ji (dedicated to the "Superiority of Buddhist Law") to be built at Shirakawa in fulfillment of a sacred vow. This temple became only the first of a series of "sacred vow" temples to be created by Imperial decree. Hosshō-ji's nine-storied pagoda would become the most elaborate Imperial-sponsored temple structure ever erected up to this time.
- 1079 (Jōryaku 3, 10th month): The emperor visited the Fushimi Inari-taisha at the foot of Mount Fushimi and the Yasaka Shrine.

== Notes ==
Preceded by Jōhō	Era or nengō Jōryaku; 1077–1081	Succeeded by Eihō
