= Princess Yasuko =

Empress consort of Japan
- Tenure: 1091–1093
- Born: 1076
- Died: 1096 (aged 19–20)
- House: Imperial House of Japan
- Father: Emperor Shirakawa
- Mother: Fujiwara no Kenshi (1057–1084)

Princess Yasuko or Princess Teishi (媞子内親王, Teishi (Yasuko) Naishinō; 1076–1096), later Ikuhomon'in (郁芳門院) was an honorary Empress of Japan to her brother Emperor Horikawa.

== Biography ==
She was the first daughter of Emperor Shirakawa and Fujiwara no Kenshi (1057–1084), and the sister of Emperor Horikawa. She served as the Saiō of her father Emperor Shirakawa in 1078–1086. In 1087, her father abdicated in favor of her brother Emperor Horikawa.

In 1091, she was appointed Honorary Empress to her twelve-year-old brother the Emperor. It was rare for a sister to be appointed Empress of her own brother, but she was actually his nurse and adoptive mother, their mother having been dead since he was five.

She retired as her brother's empress in 1093.

== Notes ==
Japanese royalty
Preceded by Fujiwara no Kenshi	Empress consort of Japan; 1091–1093	Succeeded by Princess Tokushi
