= Eichō =

Period of Japanese history (1096-1097 AD)

Eichō (永長) was a Japanese era (年号, nengō; "year name") after Kahō and before Jōtoku. This period spanned the years from December 1096 through November 1097. The reigning emperor was Emperor Horikawa-tennō (堀河天皇).

== Change of Era ==
- January 28, 1096 Eichō gannen (永長元年): The new era name was created to mark an event or series of events. The previous era ended and the new one commenced in Kahō 3, on the 17th day of the 12th month of 1096.

== Events of the Eichō Era ==
- 1096 (Eichō 1): The kampaku Fujiwara no Moromichi was raised to the second rank of the first class
- 1096 (Eichō 1): During the summer, a series of great dengaku dance performances unfolded in the streets and in open areas near the city. The participants were drawn from the aristocracy and from the common people; and even the former emperor joined along with members of the Imperial court.

== Notes ==
Preceded by Kahō	Era or nengō Eichō; 1096–1097	Succeeded by Jōtoku
