= Empress Shōshi (disambiguation) =

Fujiwara no Shōshi (988–1075) was empress consort of Japan as the wife of Emperor Ichijō.

Empress Shōshi may also refer to:

- Princess Shōshi (1027–1105), consort of Emperor Go-Reizei
- Princess Shōshi (1195–1211), honorary empress to Emperor Juntoku
- Saionji Shōshi (1271–1342), consort of Emperor Fushimi
- Princess Shōshi (1286–1348), honorary empress to Emperor Go-Daigo
