= Chōji =

Chōji (長治) was a Japanese era name (年号, nengō; "year name") after Kōwa and before Kajō. This period spanned the years from February 1104 through April 1106. The reigning emperor was Emperor Horikawa-tennō (堀河天皇).

== Change of era ==
- January 30, 1104 Chōji gannen (長治元年): The new era name was created to mark an event or series of events. The previous era ended and the new one commenced in Kōwa 6, on the 10th day of the 2nd month.

== Events of the Chōji era ==
- 1104 (Chōji 1, 3rd month): The emperor visited Sonshō-ji in northeastern Kyoto.
- 1105 (Chōji 2, 6th month): A red snow was reported as having fallen in a number of Japanese provinces.

== Notes ==
Preceded by Kōwa	Era or nengō Chōji; 1104–1106	Succeeded by Kajō
