= Jōtoku =

Period of Japanese history (1097-1099 AD)

Jōtoku (承徳) was a Japanese era name (年号, nengō; "year name") after Eichō and before Kōwa. This period spanned the years from November 1097 through August 1099. The reigning emperor was Horikawa-tennō (堀河天皇).

== Change of Era ==
- January 16, 1097 Jōtoku gannen (承徳元年): The new era name was created to mark an event or series of events. The previous era ended and the new one commenced in Eichō 2, on the 21st day of the 11th month of 1097.

== Events of the Jōtoku Era ==
- 1097 (Jōtoku 1, 1st month): The dainagon Minamoto no Tsunenobu died at age 82.
- 1097 (Jōtoku 1, 4th month): The emperor visited the temple at Gion.
- 1097 (Jōtoku 1, 10th month): The emperor visited the home of Kampaku, Fujiwara no Moromichi.

== Notes ==
Preceded by Eichō	Era or nengō Jōtoku; 1097–1099	Succeeded by Kōwa
