= Princess Reishi =

Empress consort of Japan
- Tenure: 1108–1134

Grand empress dowager of Japan
- Tenure: 1134–1144
- Born: 1078
- Died: 1144 (aged 65–66)
- House: Imperial House of Japan
- Father: Emperor Shirakawa
- Mother: Fujiwara no Kenshi (1057–1084)

Princess Reishi (1078–1144) was a Japanese Empress during the late Heian period. She was appointed honorary mother (junbo) of her nephew Emperor Toba and served as empress during his reign. She held the title from 1108 through 1134.

== Biography ==
She was the daughter of Emperor Shirakawa and Fujiwara no Kenshi (1057–1084). Her father abdicated in favor of her brother in 1087. In 1107, her brother Emperor Horikawa died and was succeeded by her four-year-old nephew, Emperor Toba. She was appointed to serve ceremoniously as the empress of her nephew in 1108.

In 1130, she ordained as a Buddhist nun.

== Notes ==
Japanese royalty
Preceded by Princess Tokushi	Empress consort of Japan; 1108–1134	Succeeded by Fujiwara no Tamako
Preceded by Princess Shōshi	Grand empress dowager of Japan; 1134–1144	Succeeded by Fujiwara no Tashi
