= Fujiwara no Kenshi =

Fujiwara no Kenshi may refer to:

- Fujiwara no Kenshi (daughter of Michinaga) (994–1027), empress consort of Emperor Sanjō
- Fujiwara no Kenshi (daughter of Akitsuna) (1050–1133), wet nurse of Emperor Horikawa
- Fujiwara no Kenshi (daughter of Morozane) (1057–1084), empress consort of Emperor Shirakawa
- Fujiwara no Kenshi (daughter of Norikane) (1155–1229), wet nurse of Emperor Go-Toba
