= Rokushō-ji =

Group of Buddhist temples in Kyoto, Japan

Rokushō-ji (六勝寺, Rokushō-ji) is a collective name for six related Buddhist temples in northeastern Kyoto, Japan.

Six independently constructed and endowed temples have come to be known collectively as the "Six Victorious Temples", encompassing monasteries which had each enjoyed extravagant Imperial patronage from their inception. They are sometimes identified as the "Superlative Temples" or the "Shō Temples" because of the middle syllable of the temple name.

== History ==
The collective name of the Rokushō-ji was formalized in the early Heian period. The Rokushō-ji had a particular function within the Imperial "cloister government" (院政, insei). The Rokushō-ji were "sacred vow temples" (gogan-ji) built by imperial command following a precedent established by Emperor Shirakawa's Hosshō-ji. Although these temple complexes were ostensibly established for a presumptively pious purpose,

the relationship of Emperors Shirakawa, Toba, Sutoku, and Konoe with Hosshō-ji and the other "imperial vow" temples and with the imperial residences that adjoined the temple complexes is quite revealing. Clearly the temples were not built simply as acts of piety but as ways of protecting estate income and a certain style of life. Evidently the building of new temples could serve as a coercive device to extract support from other kuge families and to justify the use of public taxes for the benefit of members of the imperial-house, the religious intent giving support to the political interest.

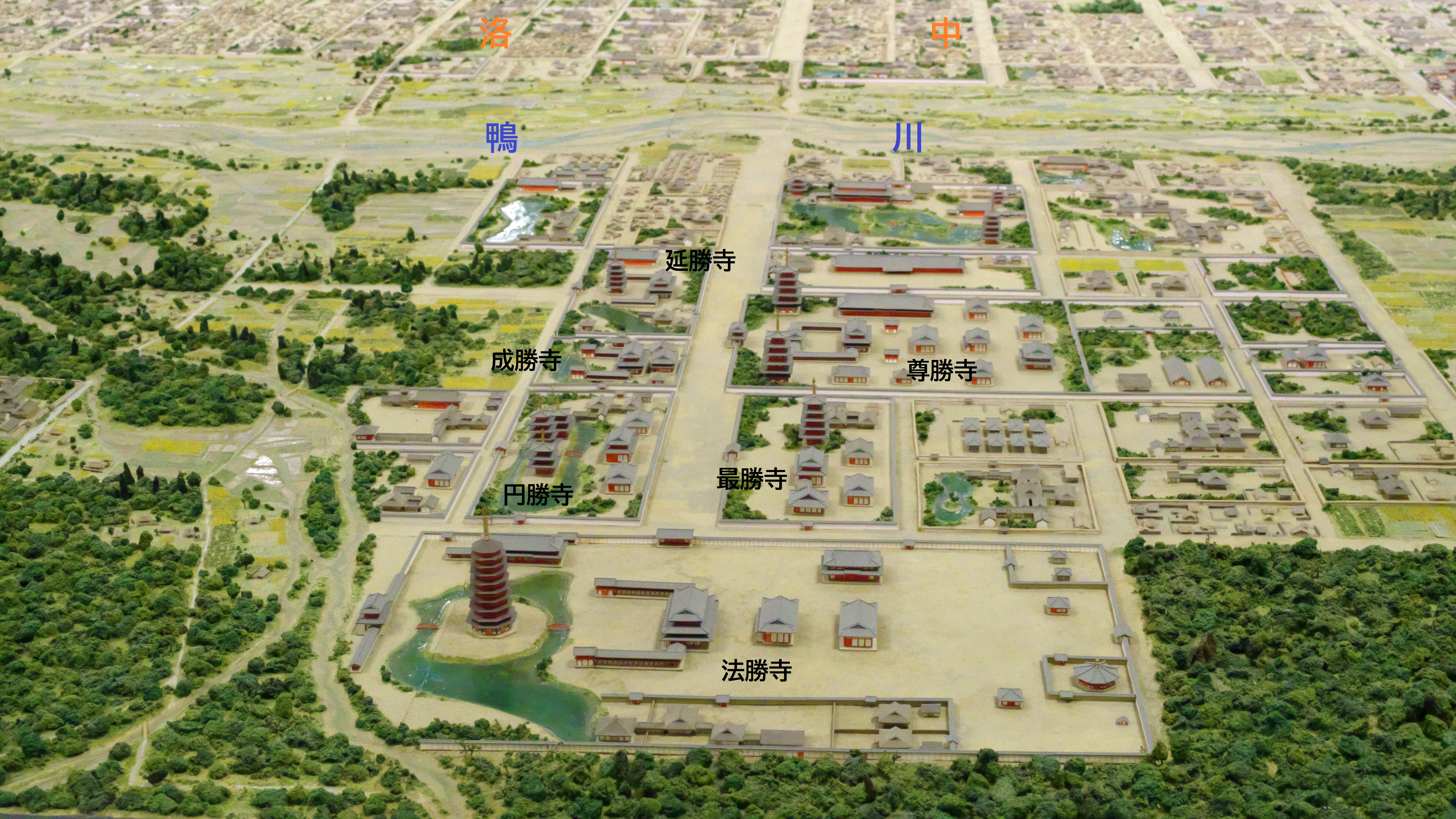
The model of 6 temples built on the eastern bank of Kamo river.

The Rokushō-ji were also called the six "Superiority Temples", and each were uniquely dedicated to an aspect of esoteric Buddhist ontology, as in:

- the "Superiority of Buddhist Law":

Hosshō-ji (法勝寺, Hosshō-ji), founded by Emperor Shirakawa in 1077.

- the "Superiority of Worship":

Sonshō-ji (尊勝寺, Sonshō-ji), founded by Emperor Horikawa (Shirakawa's son) in 1102.

- the "Most Superior":

Saishō-ji, founded by Emperor Toba (Shirakawa's grandson) in 1118.

- the "Superiority of Perfection":

Enshō-ji (円勝寺, Enshō-ji]), founded by Imperial consort Taiken-mon'in (Shirakawa's adopted daughter and the mother of Emperor Sutoku) in 1128.

- the "Superiority of Becoming":

Jōshō-ji (成勝寺, Jōshō-ji), founded by Emperor Sutoku (Shirakawa's great-grandson) in 1139.

- the "Superiority of Duration":

Enshō-ji (延勝寺, Enshō-ji), founded by Emperor Konoe (Shirakawa's great-grandson) in 1149.

== See also ==
- List of Buddhist temples in Kyoto
