= Fujiwara no Tadazane =

Fujiwara no Tadazane (藤原 忠実; 1078 – July 31, 1162) was a Japanese noble, the son of Fujiwara no Moromichi and the grandson of Fujiwara no Morozane. He was the father of Fujiwara no Tadamichi. He built a villa, Fukedono, north of the Byōdō-in Temple in 1114.

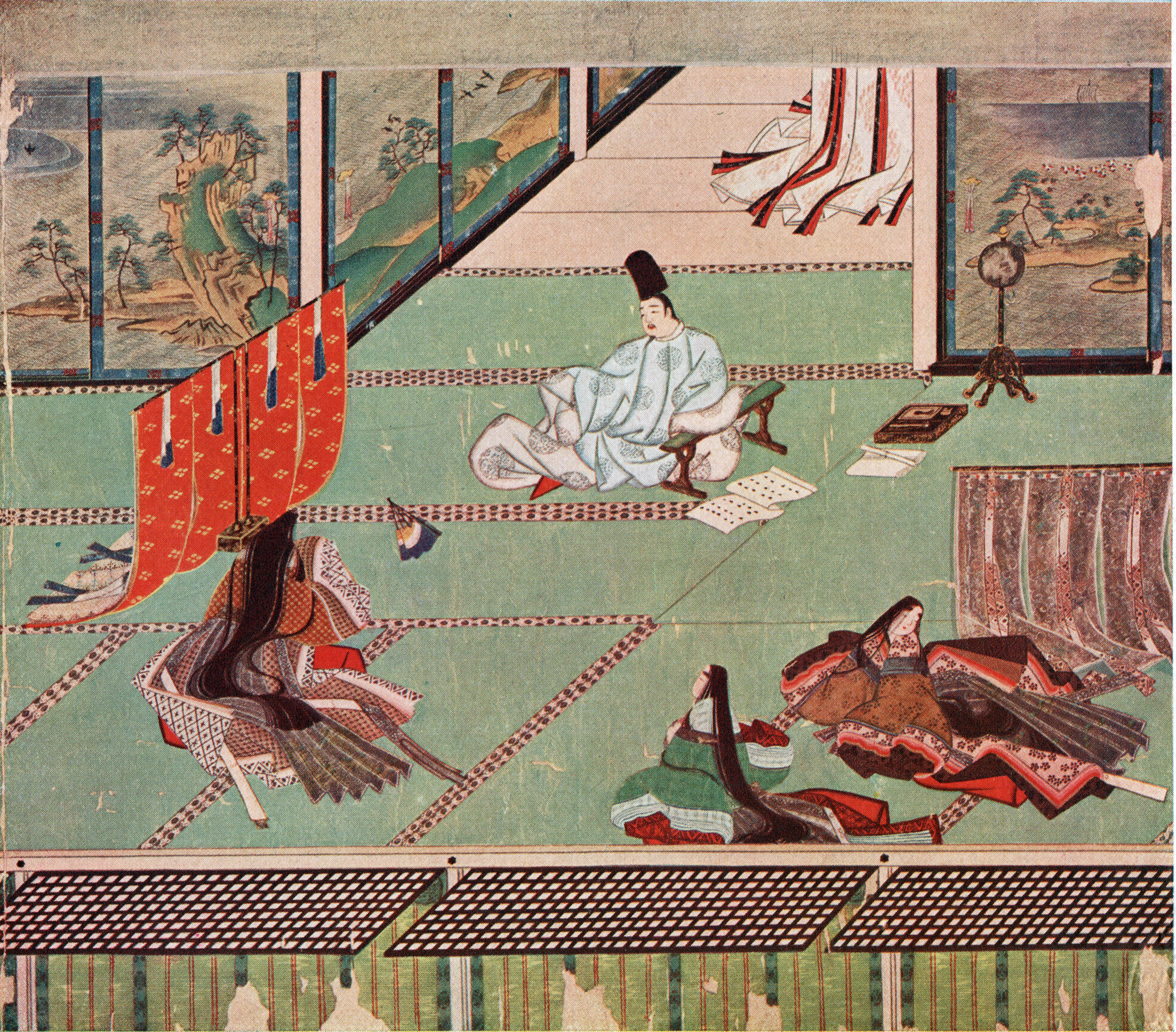
portrait of Fujiwara no Tadazane in Kasuga Gongen Genki E.

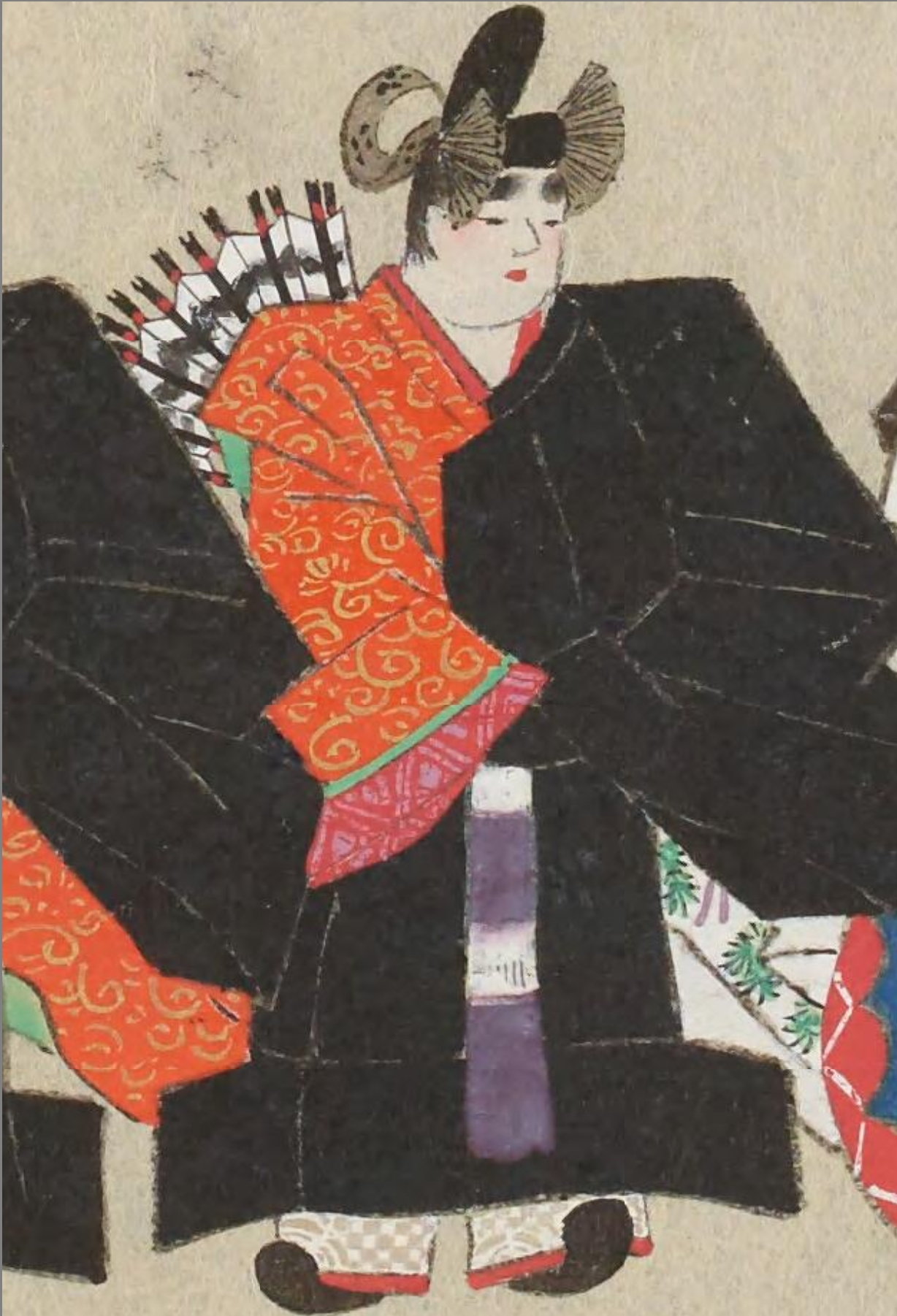
portrait of Fujiwara no Tadazane in Kasuga Gongen Genki E.

== Marriage and children ==
- Minamoto Ninshi
  - daughter
  - son
- Minamoto Zishi
  - Fujiwara no Yasuko (1095-1156) married Emperor Toba
  - Fujiwara no Tadamichi
- daughter of Fujiwara Morizane
  - Fujiwara no Yorinaga
- Harima
- unknown
  - Daughter (d.1142)
