= Shōgo-in =

Buddhist temple in Kyoto, Japan

Shōgo-in 聖護院
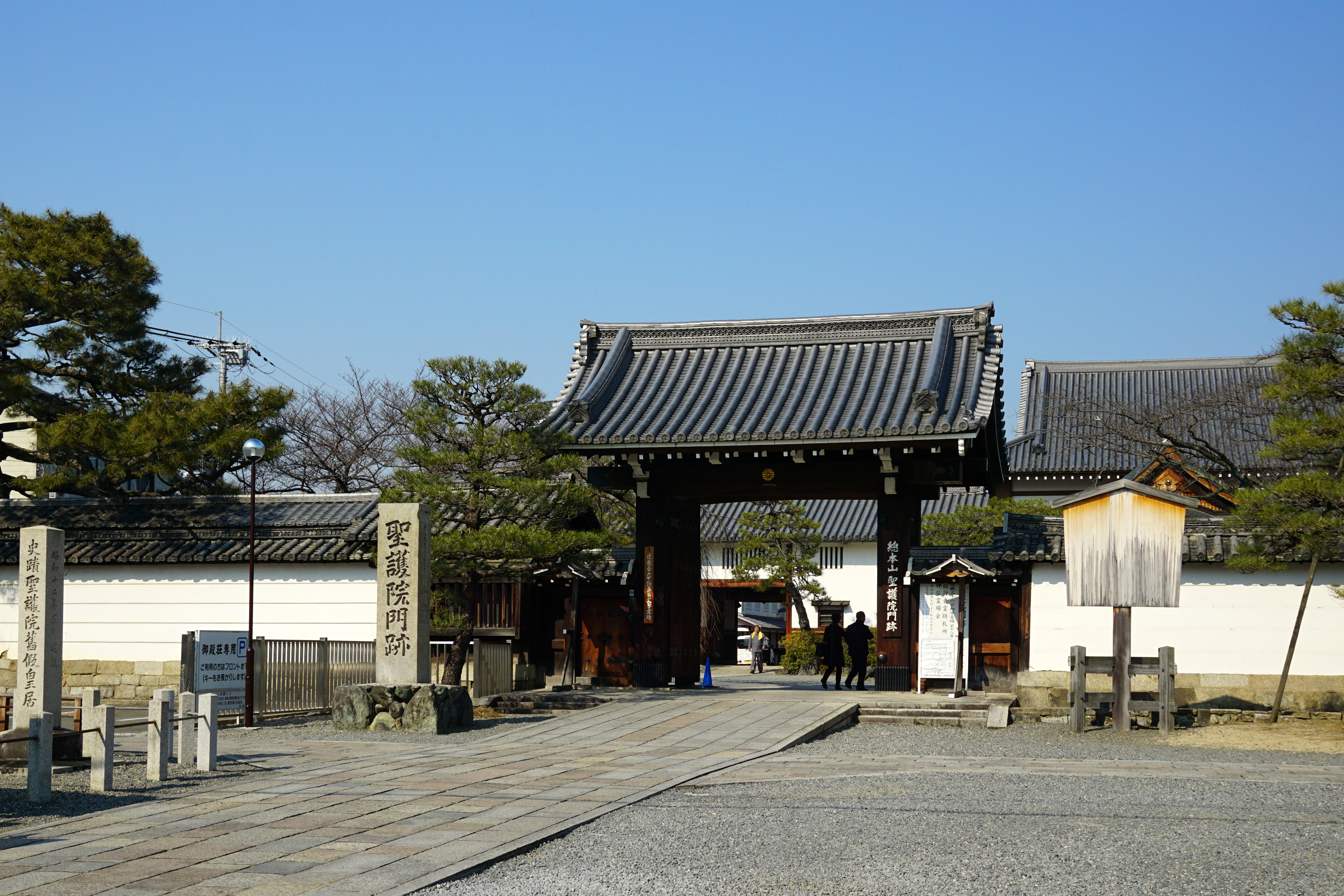
- Shōgo-in Sanmon

- Shōgo-in Shōgo-in (Japan)

Religion
- Affiliation: Buddhist
- Deity: Fudō Myōō.
- Rite: Honzan Shugen-shu

Location
- Location: 115 Nakamachi Shōgoin, Sakyō-ku, Kyoto-shi, Kyoto-fu
- Country: Japan
- Interactive map of Shōgo-in 聖護院
- Coordinates: 35°1′9″N 135°46′49″E

Architecture
- Founder: Zōyo
- Completed: c.1090

Website
- Official website
- National Historic Site of Japan

Shōgo-in (聖護院) is a Buddhist temple in the Shogoin-Nakamachi neighborhood of Sakyō-ku in the city of Kyoto, Japan. Its honzon is an image of Fudō Myōō. It is also called the Shōgoin-monzeki (聖護院門跡), and is the central temple of the Honzan school of Shugendō in Japan, and is the head temple that governs the "Kasumi" (regional organizations that control Shugendō practitioners) throughout the country. It boasted high status. Of the 37 head priests up until the Meiji period, 25 were from the imperial family and 12 were from the regent family. In the late Edo period, it was used as a temporary imperial palace twice, and in due to this connection, its precincts were designated a National Historic Site in 1937.

== History ==
Shōgo-in was founded by the monk Zōyo of Onjō-ji. Zōyo was a famous Shugendō monk, succeeding his master Enchin and carrying out the same training at Mount Ōmine in Kumano that his master had done. In 1090, he served as a guide for the retired Emperor Shirakawa on his pilgrimage to Kumano. For this achievement, Zōyo was appointed the first Kumano Sanzan Kengyō (the general manager of the Kumano Sanzan sacred sites), and was also bestowed Jōkō-ji, located near Kumano Shrine in Kyoto, which was believed to have been founded by En no Gyōja. He constructed Shōgo-in on the grounds of this shrine. However, the name "Shōgo-in" does not appear in documentary records until 1132, which was after Zōyo's death. After Zōyo, the successive head priests of Shōgo-in served as guides for the retired emperor on pilgrimages to Kumano. During the Heian period, pilgrimages to Kumano flourished. Later, Prince Shizue, son of the retired Emperor Go-Shirakawa, became monk at Shōgo-in, further strengthening its prestige, and thenceforth Shōgo-in was a monzeki temple who head was a member of the imperial family or a descendant of the regent family. Prince Kakusuke, son of the retired Emperor Go-Saga, held the position of monzeki for 70 years and also served as the abbot of Onjō-ji, the head priest of Tsurugaoka Hachiman-gu, and the inspector of the three Kumano Sanzan. However, after his death the position of head priest became embroiled in the disputes between the Southern and Northern Courts, or within the Northern Court, leading the Muromachi shogunate to intervene in the succession.

During the Ōnin War, Shōgo-in was burned down, and the head priest, Michioki, was suspected of colluding with the Western Army due to his friendship with Ashikaga Yoshimi fled to Mino Province. However, after the war ended, he was pardoned and moved to Hase in the north of Kyoto (present-day Iwakura Hase-chō, Sakyō-ku, Kyoto) and attempted to restore the temple. Afterwards, throughout the Sengoku period, the temple ruled by head priests from the Konoe family, and they served as a liaison between the shogunate and various daimyō. By order of Toyotomi Hideyoshi, the temple was moved to Karasuma Imadegawa, but was destroyed by the 1676 Kyoto fire during the Edo period. It was subsequently rebuilt at its original location, where it remains to this day.

After the Kyoto Tenmei Fire of 1788, Emperor Kokaku used the Shinden Hall at Shōgo-in as a temporary palace. Emperor Kōmei also used it as a temporary palace after the Kyoto Imperial Palace burned down in 1854. The head priest of Shōgo-in at the time was Emperor Kokaku's younger brother, Prince Hirohito. In February 1864, the Kyoto Shugoshoku established a military training ground in Shōgo-in village, which was on the temple's land. Because of this relationship, the temple joined the "Kyoto Shugoshoku Shinsengumi Pilgrimage Association", which was formed by three Kyoto temples related to the Kyoto Shugoshoku and the Shinsengumi.

On January 8, 1868, the head priest of Shōgo-in, Prince Takehito, returned to secular life and became Prince Yoshikoto, serving as the Navy Commander-in-Chief. After his death, his half-brother Prince Tomonari, who had also entered Shōgo-in, inherited the title of "Shōgoin-no-miya", but was later renamed Prince Kitashirakawa Satonari.

The Main Hall of Shōgo-in was reconstructed in 1968; however, the Shinden Palace is a structure from the mid-Edo period. The temple's shoin is a structure relocated from the Kyoto Imperial Palace and is a National Important Cultural Property. The temple possesses many more Important Cultural Properties, including a statue of Enchin dated 1143. In 2000, a multi-year renovation of the temple was completed to commemorate the 1300th anniversary of En no Gyoja's death.

Shōgo-in is located immediately north of Heian Jingu, or 1.3 kilometers north of Higashiyama Station on the Kyoto City Subway Tozai Line.

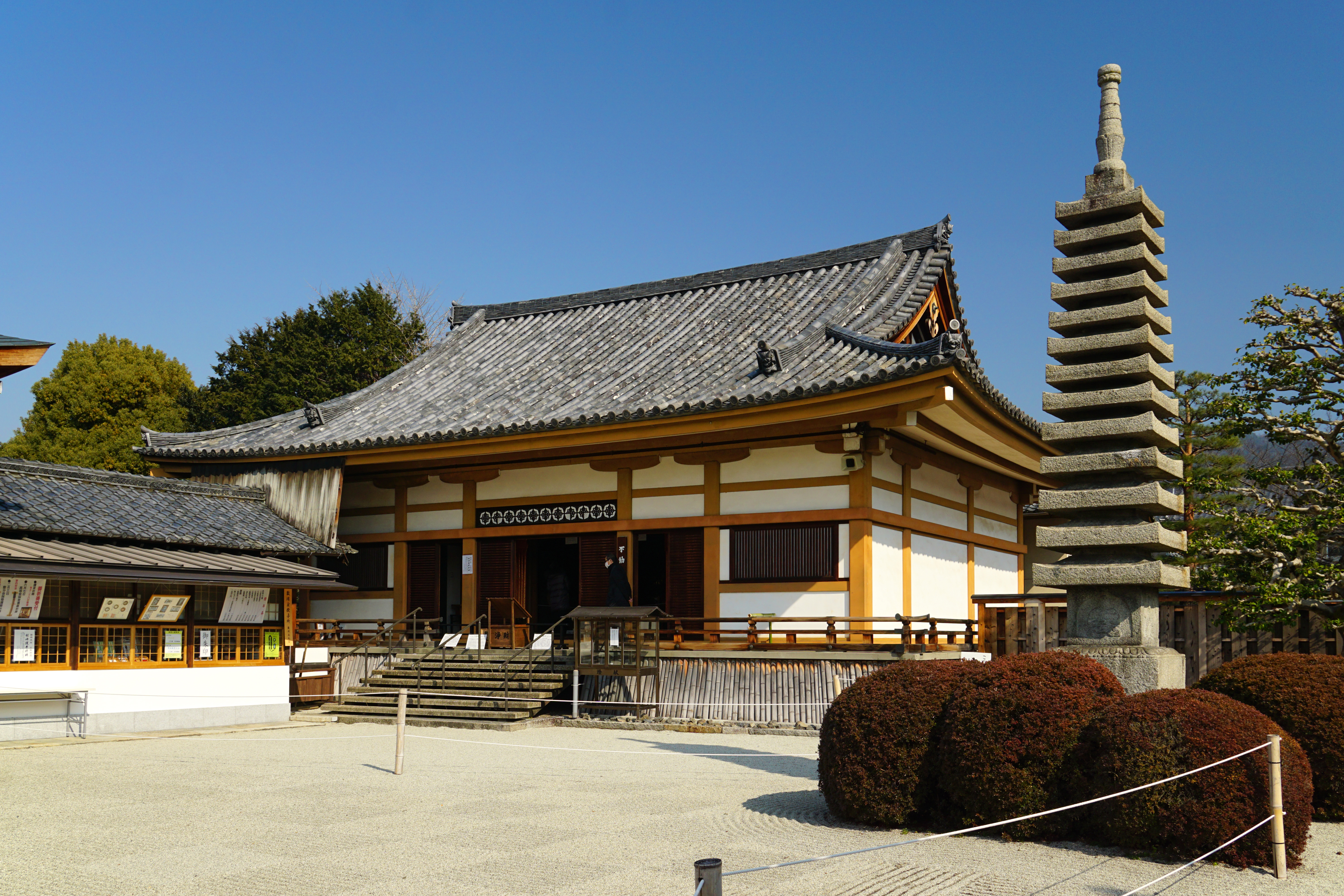
Main Hall

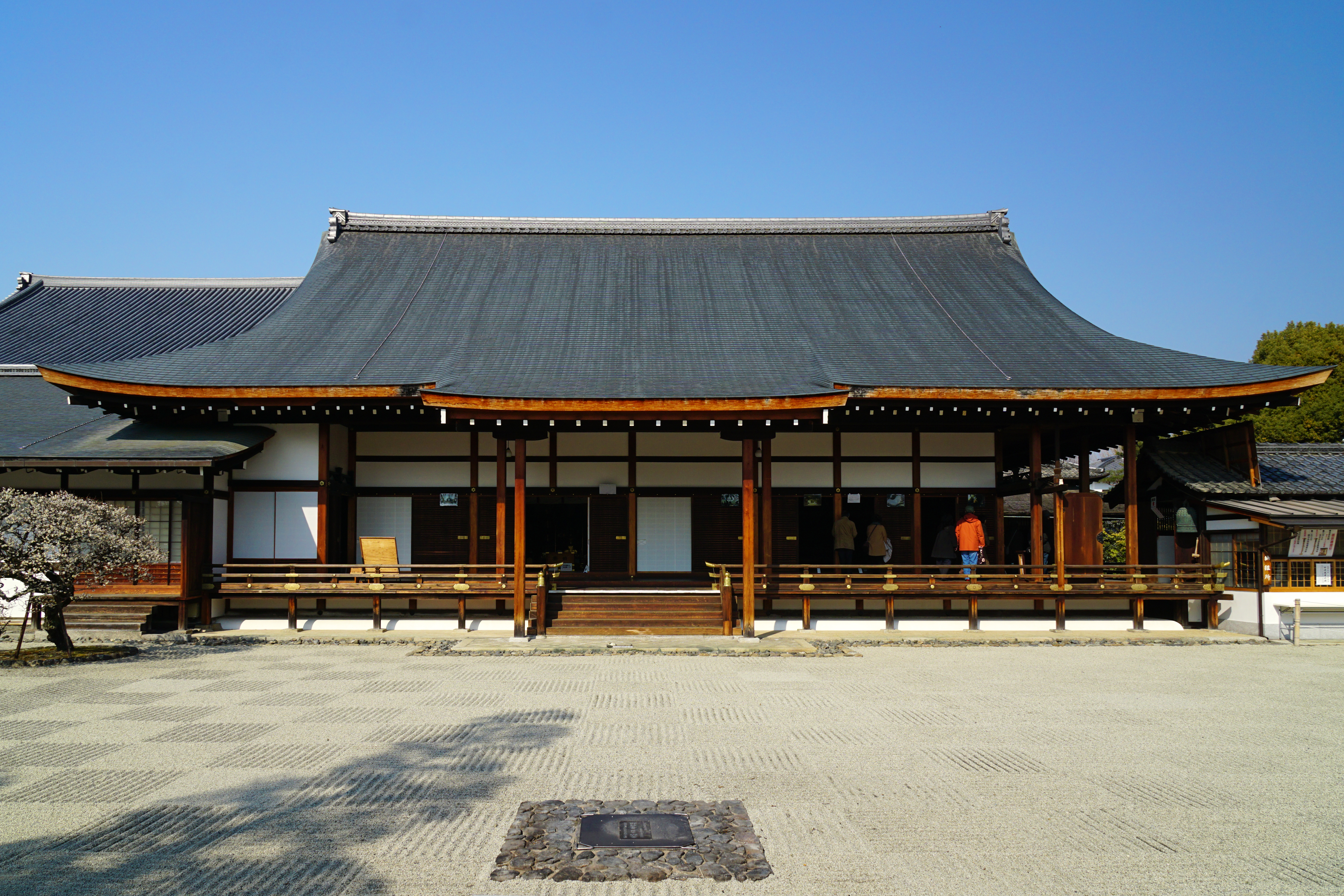
Shinden Hall

== See also ==
- List of Historic Sites of Japan (Kyoto)
