= Hosshō-ji =

Buddhist temple in Kyōto, Japan

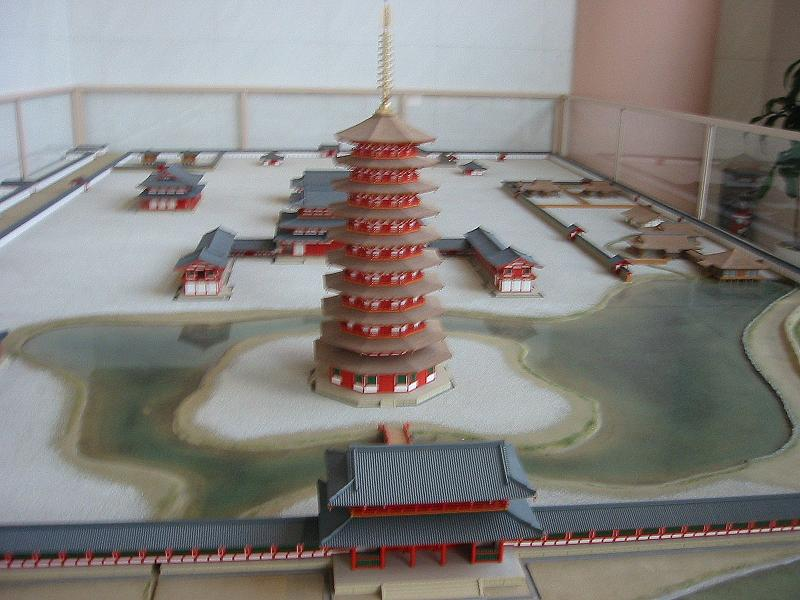
The chief focal point of the Hosshō-ji temple complex was its nine-storied octagonal pagoda, as recreated here in a modern architectural model.

Hosshō-ji (Japanese: 法勝寺, Hepburn: Hosshō-ji) was a Buddhist temple in northeastern Kyoto, Japan, endowed by Emperor Shirakawa in fulfillment of a sacred vow. The temple complex was located east of the Kamo River in the Shirakawa district; and its chief architectural feature was a nine-storied octagonal pagoda.

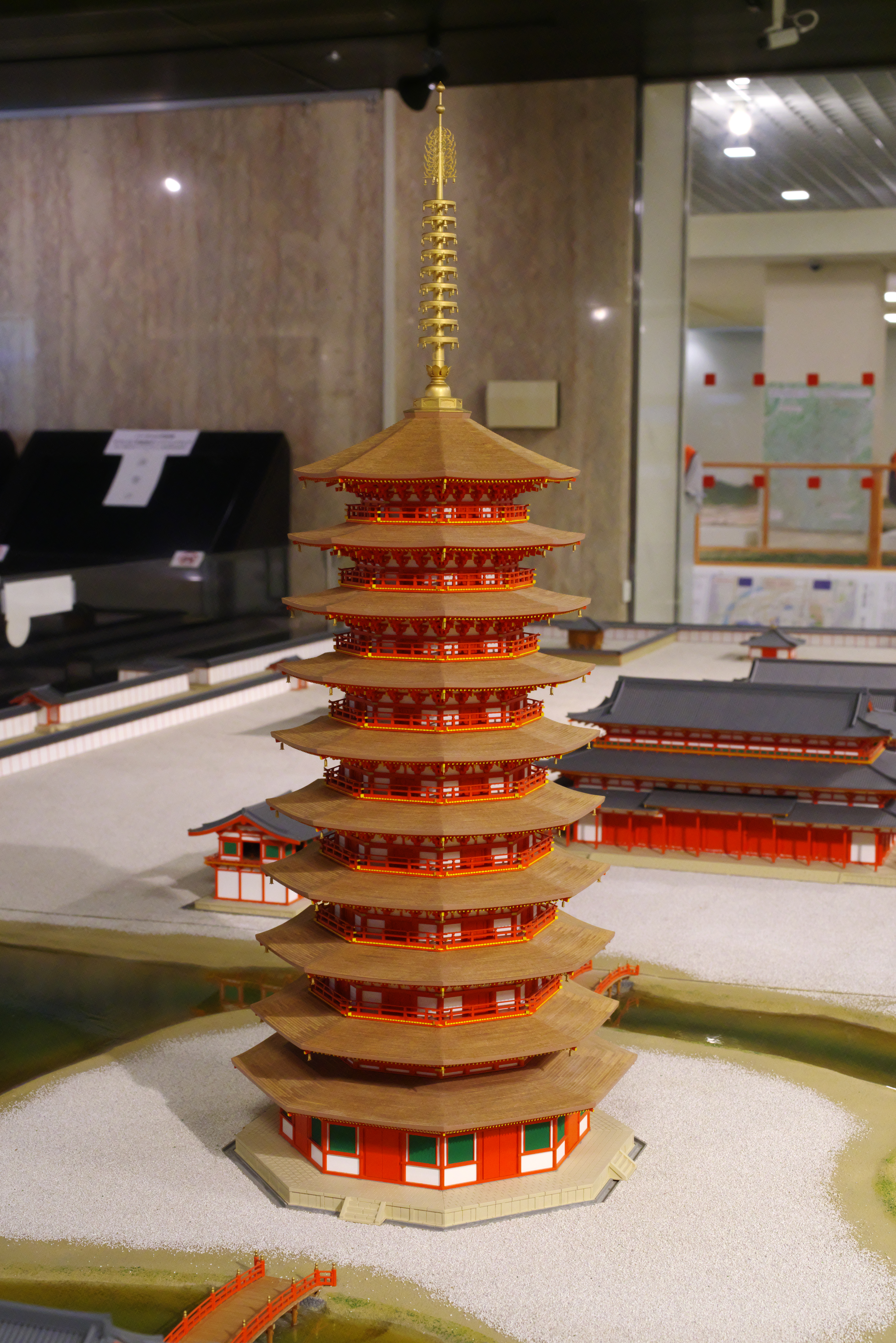
The Model of nine-story pagoda of Hosshō-ji temple.

Hosshō-ji is known as one of the "Six Victorious Temples" (六勝寺, Rokushō-ji), which encompass monasteries enjoying extravagant Imperial patronage from their inception. They are sometimes identified as the "Superlative Temples" or the "Shō Temples" because of the middle syllable of the temple name.

== History ==
Hosshō-ji was founded in the early Heian period. It was built on the site of one of Emperor Shirakawa's former palaces.

This temple and the other Rokushō-ji establishments had a particular function within the "cloister government" (insei) system. Although the monasteries were ostensibly established in fulfillment of vows made by these members of the Imperial family, the relationship of Emperors Shirakawa, Toba, Sutoku, and Konoe with Hosshō-ji and the other "imperial vow" temples and with the imperial residences that adjoined the temple complexes is quite revealing. Clearly the temples were not built simply as acts of piety but as ways of protecting estate income and a certain style of life. Evidently the building of new temples could serve as a coercive device to extract support from other kuge families and to justify the use of public taxes for the benefit of members of the imperial-house, the religious intent giving support to the political interest.

The Rokushō-ji were also called the six "Superiority Temples;" and each were uniquely dedicated to an aspect of esoteric Buddhist ontology, as in

- the "Superiority of Buddhist Law" –

Hosshō-ji, founded by Emperor Shirakawa in 1077.

- the "Superiority of Worship" –

Sonshō-ji (尊勝寺, Sonshō-ji), founded by Emperor Horikawa (Shirakawa's son) in 1102.

- the "Most Superior" –

Saishō-ji, founded by Emperor Toba (Shirakawa's grandson) in 1118.

- the "Superiority of Perfection" –

Enshō-ji (円勝寺, Enshō-ji), founded by Imperial consort Taiken-mon'in (Shirakawa's adopted daughter and Emperor Toba's chief consort and the mother of Emperor Sutoku) in 1128.

- the "Superiority of Becoming" –

Jōshō-ji (成勝寺, Jōshō-ji), founded by Emperor Sutoku (Shirakawa's great-grandson) in 1139.

- the "Superiority of Duration" –

Enshō-ji (延勝寺, Enshō-ji), founded by Emperor Konoe (Shirakawa's great-grandson) in 1149.

An earthquake in 1185 destroyed most of the structures, and they were not reconstructed. Surviving structures at Hosshō-ji were lost to a fire in 1342. Currently the site is occupied by Kyoto City Zoo and the Shirakawain ryōkan.

== See also ==
- List of Buddhist temples in Kyoto
