= Eihō =

Period of Japanese history (1081–1084 CE)

Eihō (永保) was a Japanese era (年号, nengō; lit. "year name") after Jōryaku and before Ōtoku. This period spanned the years from February 1081 through April 1084. The reigning emperor was Emperor Shirakawa-tennō (白河天皇).

== Change of Era ==
- February 12, 1081 Eihō gannen (永保元年): The new era name was created to mark an event or series of events. The previous era ended and the new one commenced in Jōryaku 5, on the 10th day of the 2nd month of 1081.

== Events of the Eihō Era ==
- May 26, 1081 (Eihō 1, 15th day of the 4th month): The Buddhist Temple of Miidera was set on fire by the monks of a rival sect on Mount Hiei.
- July 12, 1081 (Eihō 1, 4th day of the 6th month): Miidera was burned again by monks from Mt. Hiei.
- 1083 (Eihō 3, 10th month): At Hosshō-ji, construction begins on a nine-story pagoda.

== Notes ==
Preceded by Jōryaku	Era or nengō Eihō; 1081–1084	Succeeded by Ōtoku
