= Enkyū =

Period of Japanese history (1069–1074 CE)

Enkyū (延久) was a Japanese era name (年号, nengō; lit. "year name") after Jiryaku and before Jōhō. This period spanned the years from April 1069 through August 1074. The reigning emperors were Go-Sanjō-tennō (後三条天皇) and Shirakawa-tennō (白河天皇).

== Change of Era ==
- 1069 (Enkyū gannen (延久元年)): The new era name was created to mark an event or series of events. The previous era ended and the new one commenced in Jiryaku 5, on the 13th day of the 4th month of 1069.

== Events of the Enkyū Era ==
- 1069 (Enkyū 1): The consort of the newly elevated emperor was raised to the status of chūgū.
- 1072 (Enkyū 4, 8th day of the 12th month): In the 6th year of Emperor Go-Sanjō-tennō's reign (桓武天皇6年), the emperor in favor of his son, and the succession (senso) was received by his son. Shortly thereafter, Emperor Shirakawa is said to have acceded to the throne (sokui).
- 1073 (Enkyū 5, 21st day of the 4th month): Go-Sanjō entered the Buddhist priesthood; and his new priestly name became Kongō-gyō.
- 1073 (Enkyū 5, 7th day of the 5th month): The former-Emperor Go-Sanjō died at the age of 40.

Preceded by Jiryaku	Era or nengō Enkyū; 1069–1073	Succeeded by Jōhō
