= Kahō =

Period of Japanese history (1094-1096 AD)

Kahō (嘉保) was a Japanese era (年号, nengō, "year name") after Kanji and before Eichō. This period spanned the years from December 1094 through December 1096. The reigning emperor was Emperor Horikawa-tennō (堀河天皇).

== Change of Era ==
- January 19, 1094 Kahō gannen (嘉保元年): The new era name was created to mark an event or series of events. The previous era ended and the new one commenced in Kanji 8, on the 15th day of the 12th month of 1094.

== Events of the Kahō Era ==
- 1095 (Kahō 2, 4th month): Emperor Horikawa paid visits to the Iwashimizu Shrine and to the Kamo Shrines.
- 1095 (Kahō 2, 8th month): The emperor was stricken with intermittent fevers; and he ordered prayers to be offered for his return to good health. After Horikawa recovered his health, he was generous and appreciative to the Buddhist priests who had prayed for his recovery.
- 1095 (Kahō 2, 11th month): The Buddhist priests of Mt. Hiei came down from their mountain to protest a dispute with Minamoto Yoshitsuna and other government officials which had led to military action and bloodshed. The priests carried a portable shrine as far as the central hall of Enryaku-ji, where a curse was laid on daijō-daijin Fujiwara Moromichi.
- November 26, 1096 (Kahō 3, 9th day of the 11th month): Former-Emperor Shirakawa entered the Buddhist priesthood at the age of 44.

== Notes ==
| Preceded by Kanji | Era or nengō Kahō; 1094–1096 | Succeeded by Eichō |
