= Fujiwara no Kinshi (Go-Nijō) =

Tokudaiji Kinshi 徳大寺忻子

Empress consort of Japan
- Tenure: 4 November 1303 – 10 September 1308
- Born: 1283; Heian-kyō (Kyōto)
- Died: 16 February 1352 (aged 68–69); Heian-kyō (Kyōto)
- Spouse: Emperor Go-Nijō (m. 1303; died 1308)
- House: Imperial House of Japan
- Father: Tokudaiji Kintaka
- Mother: Fujiwara no Yoshiko (藤原喜子)

Fujiwara no Kinshi (藤原（徳大寺）忻子; 1283 – 16 February 1352), also known as Chōrakumon-in (長楽門院), was the empress consort of Emperor Go-Nijō.

She was the eldest daughter of Daijō-daijin Tokudaiji Kintaka. Her mother was Fujiwara no Yoshiko (藤原喜子), the third daughter of Naidaijin Sanjō Kinchika.

In 1303, Kinshi became a court lady of Emperor Go-Nijō. She gained the position of chūgū later the same year. However, she did not bear the emperor any children. In 1308, Go-Nijō died, and Kinshi became a nun. In 1311, she was granted the name Chōrakumon-in.

She died in 1352, at the age of 70.

== Notes ==
Japanese royalty
Preceded by Fujiwara no Shōshi	Empress consort of Japan; 1303–1308	Succeeded by Princess Shōshi
