= Kanji (era) =

Period of Japanese history (1087–1094 CE)

Kanji (寛治) was a Japanese era (年号, nengō, "year name") after Ōtoku and before Kahō. This period spanned the years from April 1087 through December 1094. The reigning emperor was Emperor Horikawa (堀河天皇).

== Change of era ==
- February 6, 1087 Kanji gannen (寛治元年): The new era name was created to mark an event or series of events. The previous era ended and the new one commenced in Ōtoku 4, on the 7th day of the 4th month of 1087.

== Events of the Kanji era ==
- 1087 (Kanji 1, 5th month): Daijō-tennō Shirakawa retired himself to Uji.
- 1088 (Kanji 2, 1st month): The emperor paid a visit to his father's home.
- 1088 (Kanji 2, 10th month): Shirakawa visited the temples at Mt. Hiei.
- January 28, 1088 (Kanji 2, 14th day of the 12th month): The sesshō Fujiwara Morozane was given additional honors with the further title of daijō-daijin. In this context, it matters a great deal that the mother of Emperor Horikowa, formerly the daughter of udaijin Minamoto no Akifusa, was also formerly the adopted child of Morozane.
- 1089 (Kanji 3, 5th month): Shirakawa made a second visit to Mt. Hiei; and this time, he stayed seven days.
- 1090 (Kanji 4, 12th month): Fujiwara Morozane was relieved of his responsibilities as sesshō and he was simultaneously named kampaku.
- March 26, 1094 (Kanji 8, 8th day of the 3rd month): Morozane resigned from his position as kampaku.

== Notes ==
Preceded by Ōtoku	Era or nengō Kanji; 1087–1094	Succeeded by Kahō
