= Ōtoku =

Period of Japanese history (1084–1087 CE)

Ōtoku (応徳) was a Japanese era name (年号, nengō; "year name") after Eihō and before Kanji. This period spanned the years from February 1084 through April 1087. The reigning emperor was Emperor Shirakawa-tennō (白河天皇).

== Change of Era ==
- February 9, 1084 Ōtoku gannen (応徳元年): The new era name was created to mark an event or series of events. The previous era ended and the new one commenced in Eihō 4, on the 7th day of the 2nd month.

== Events of the Ōtoku Era ==
- 1084 (Ōtoku 1, 9th month): The empress Kenshi, the emperor's principal consort, died. Shirakawa was afflicted with great grief, and for a time, he turned over the administration of the government to his ministers.
- 1086 (Ōtoku 3, 9th month): Shirakawa announced his intention to abdicate in favor of his son.
- January 3, 1087 (Ōtoku 3, 26th day of the 11th month): Shirakawa formally abdicated, and he took the title Daijō-tennō. Shirakawa had personally occupied the throne for 14 years; and for the next 43 years, he would exercise broad powers in what will come to be known as cloistered rule.

== Notes ==
| Preceded by Eihō | Era or nengō Ōtoku; 1084–1087 | Succeeded by Kanji |
