= Jōhō =

Period of Japanese history (1074–1077 CE)

Jōhō (承保) was a Japanese era name (年号, nengō, lit. year name) after Enkyū and before Jōryaku. This period spanned the years from August 1074 through November 1077. The reigning emperor was Emperor Shirakawa-tennō (白河天皇).

== Change of Era ==
- January 30, 1074 Jōhō gannen (承保元年): The new era name was created to mark an event or series of events. The previous era ended and the new one commenced in Enkyū 6, on the 23rd day of the 8th month of 1074.

== Events of the Jōhō Era ==
- 1074 (Jōhō 1, 1st month): Dainagon Minamoto- no Takakune asked to be relieved of his duties because of his age. He was 71, and he wanted to retire to Uji. In his retirement, he was visited by many friends with whom he pursued research into the history of Japan. He brought this work together in a book.
- March 7, 1074 (Jōhō 1, 7th day of the 2nd month): The former kampaku Fujiwara Yorimichi died aged 83. In this same period, his sister, the widow of Emperor Ichijo, died aged 87.
- October 25, 1074 (Jōhō 1, 3rd day of the 10th month): Empress Jōtō-mon In died at the age of 87.

== Notes ==
Preceded by Enkyū	Era or nengō Jōhō; 1074–1077	Succeeded by Jōryaku
