= Kajū-ji =

Shingon Buddhist temple in Kyoto, Japan

Coordinates: 34°57′42″N 135°48′27″E

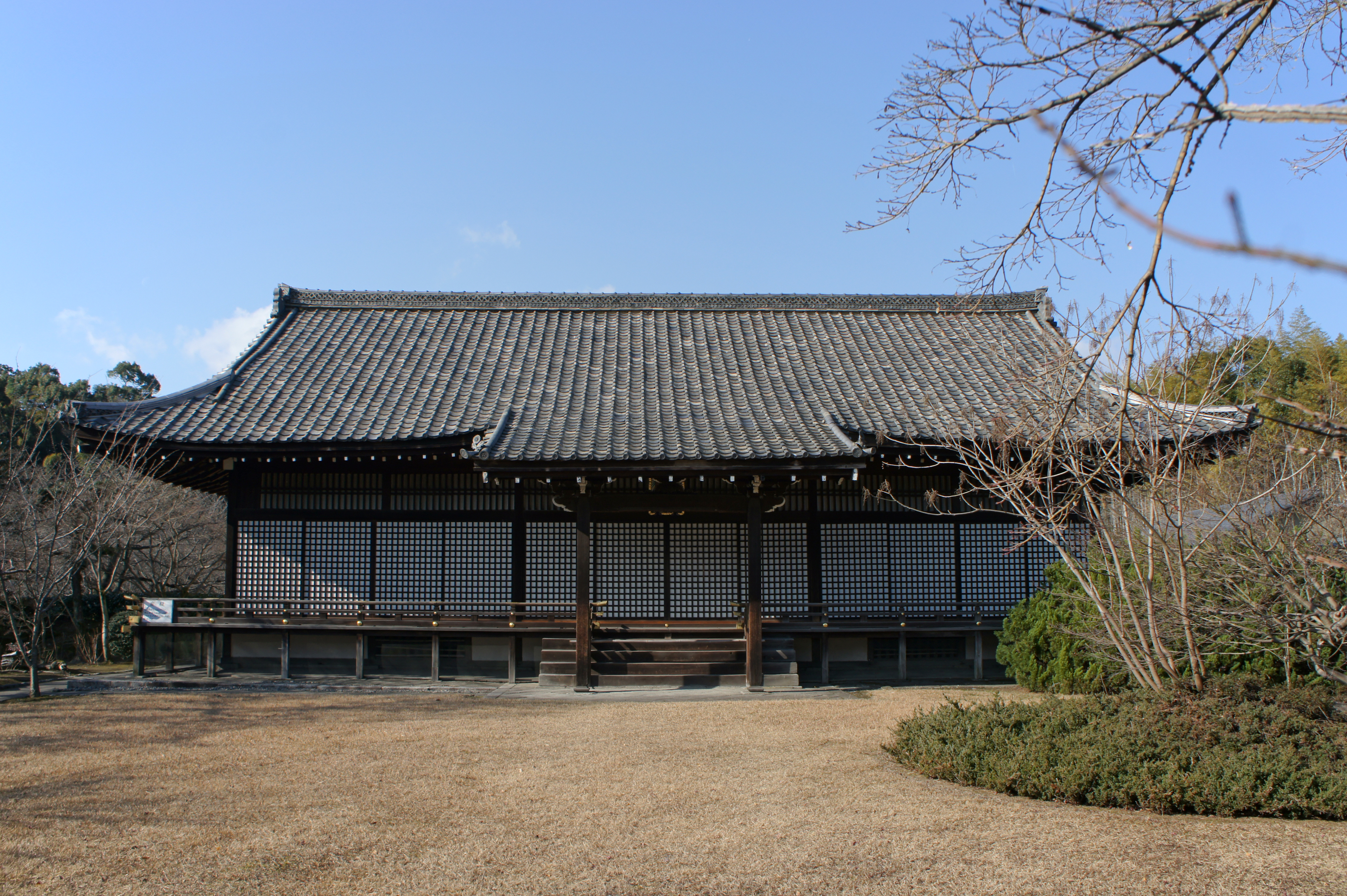
Shinden

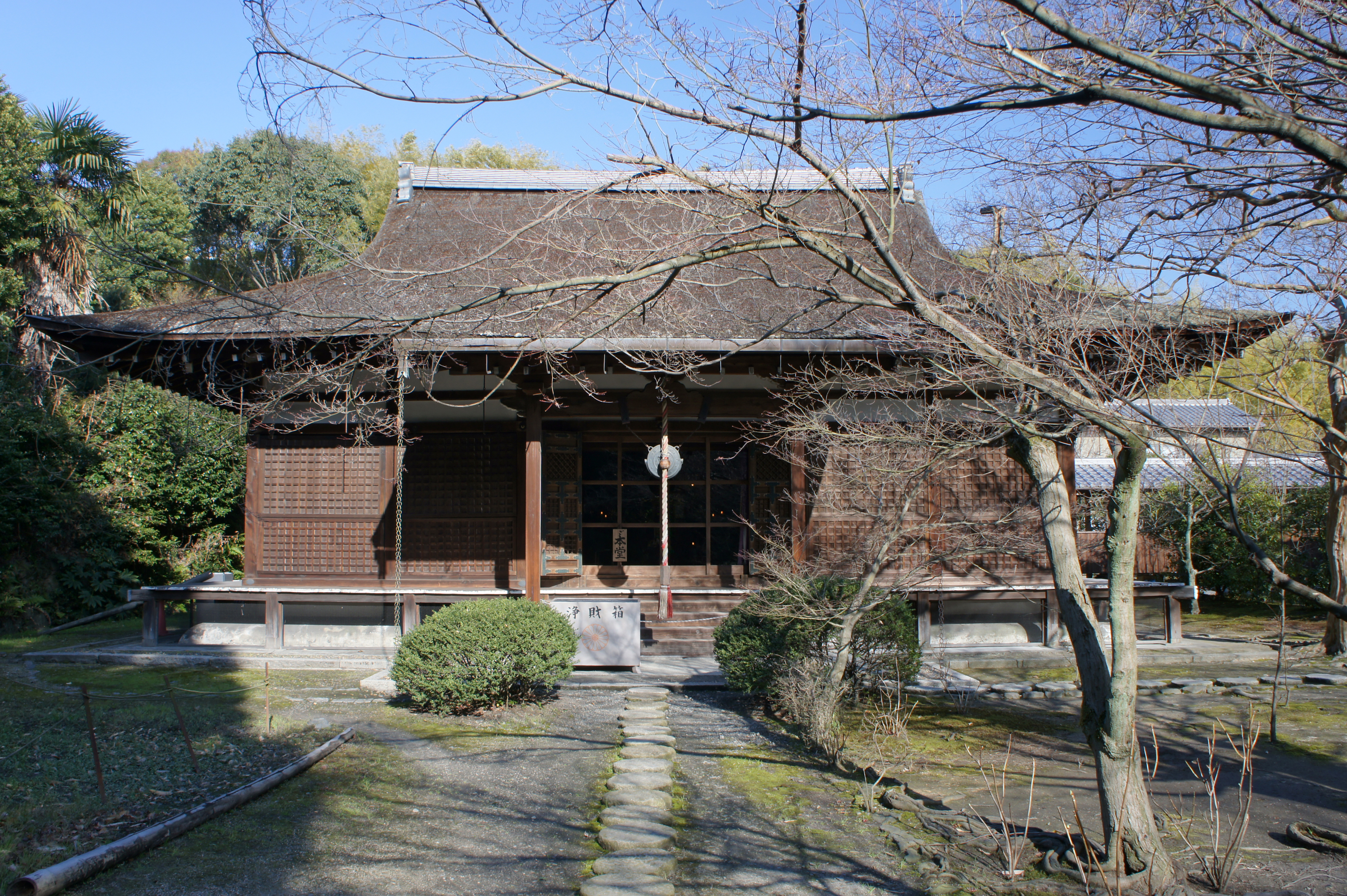
Hon-do

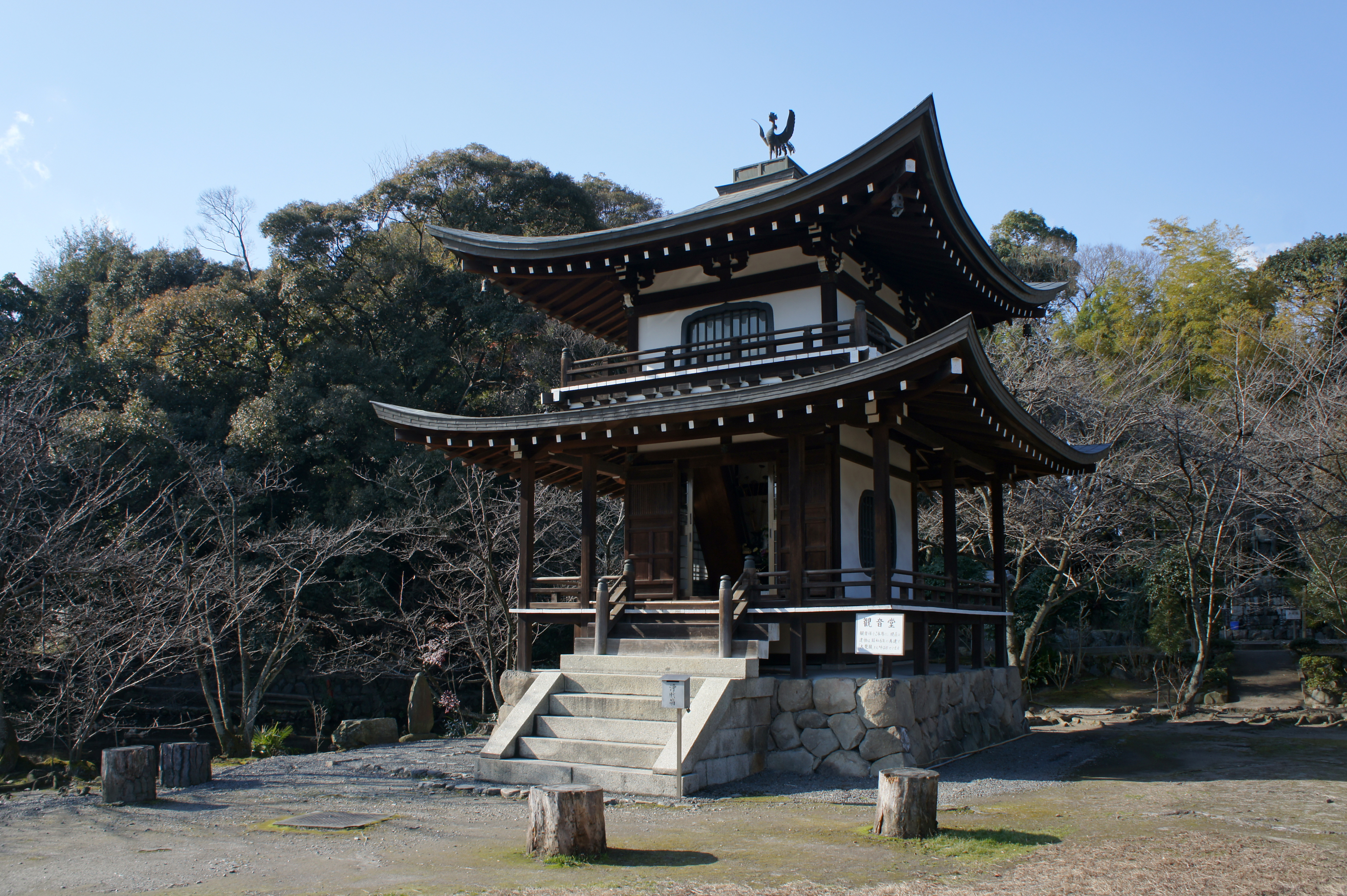
Kannon-do

Kajū-ji (勧修寺, Kajū-ji), also sometimes spelled "Kwajū-ji" or "Kanshu-ji, is a Shingon Buddhist temple in Yamashina-ku, Kyoto, Japan.

== History ==
A temple has existed on this site from as early as 900 AD. Kajū-ji, known familiarly as "Kikki-san," was founded by Emperor Daigo. This site is said to have been chosen because the mother of the emperor had lived a significant part of her life in this place; and after her death, the temple was established in her memory.

The temple was destroyed in 1470 during the Onin War and then later restored by the Tokugawa family and the Imperial Household. Successive head priests have been drawn directly from the Imperial family. Mito Mitsukuni (popularly known as Mito Komon) is said to have donated the stone lantern in front of the Shoin.

=== Monzeki ===
Japanese Buddhist priests of aristocratic or imperial lineage were more particularly identified as monzeki (門跡, monzeki). The term was also applied to the temples and monastic communities in which they were joined; and Kajū-ji was a monzeki temple. Beginning in 942, imperial princes lived as monks at Kajū-ji.

The eldest son of head of the Fushimi-no-miya branches of the imperial family was adopted at age two in 1818 by former-Emperor Kōkaku. Akira-shinnō entered the priesthood under the title Siahn Hoshinnō and later became prince-abbot of Kajū-ji.

In 1842, he angered the Tokugawa bakufu, which stripped him of his post and confined him to the temple of To-ji. In 1858, Emperor Komei adopted Akira and granted him the title Yamashina-no-miya. In 1864, the bakufu reinstated him.

== Garden and pond ==
Kajū-ji is renowned for its gardens and its water-lily pond. The garden would originally have been used for boating and poem-writing parties, but today one can still stroll through the site.

The large pond here, also known as hamuro-no-ike, is the main feature of this garden. This water-garden is known for its lotus, water lilies and irises. The temple pond was probably at one time the main element of a much larger pond and hill garden on the estate of Miyamichi Iemasu, a member of the Heian aristocracy and connected through marriage to the powerful Fujiwara family.

One famous old plum tree transplanted from the Imperial Palace in Edo Period can be viewed year round, but it is said to be best in February.

== Art ==
A tapestry image of the preaching Shaka-Nyorai (an alternate name for the founder of Buddhism) has been passed down within the temple over the centuries. This artwork is a National Treasure which is currently held in the collection of Nara National Museum.

== See also ==
- List of Buddhist temples in Kyoto
