= Princess Kaoruko =

Empress consort of Japan
- Tenure: 1069–1073
- Born: 1029
- Died: 1093 (aged 63–64)
- Spouse: Emperor Go-Sanjō
- House: Imperial House of Japan
- Father: Emperor Go-Ichijō
- Mother: Fujiwara no Ishi

Princess Kaoruko (馨子内親王, Kaoruko-naishinno; 1029–1093), also known as Saiin-no Kōgō (西院皇后), was an empress consort (chūgū) of her cousin Emperor Go-Sanjō of Japan.

== Biography ==
While a young child, she served as a Saiin (priestess) from 1032 until 1036. She was a daughter of Emperor Go-Ichijō, and as such, marriage to her represented a means to lessen some of the influence of the powerful Fujiwara family (from which imperial consorts usually came). She married her cousin the future emperor in 1051. In 1068, her husband became emperor, and she was appointed empress.

Her husband had three consorts: Kaoruko, Minamoto Motoko, and Fujiwara Shigeko. The emperor hoped that Kaoruko would bear an heir, and thus allow him to pass the throne to a non-Fujiwara son. She had no children, however, and after the death of her husband, she became a Buddhist nun under the name Saiin-no Kōgō (西院皇后).

Japanese royalty
Preceded by Fujiwara no Kanshi	Empress consort of Japan; 1069–1073	Succeeded by Fujiwara no Kenshi
