= Otagi Nenbutsu-ji =

Buddhist temple in Kyoto, Japan

Coordinates: 35°01′53″N 135°39′40″E

Otagi Nenbutsu-ji 愛宕念仏寺
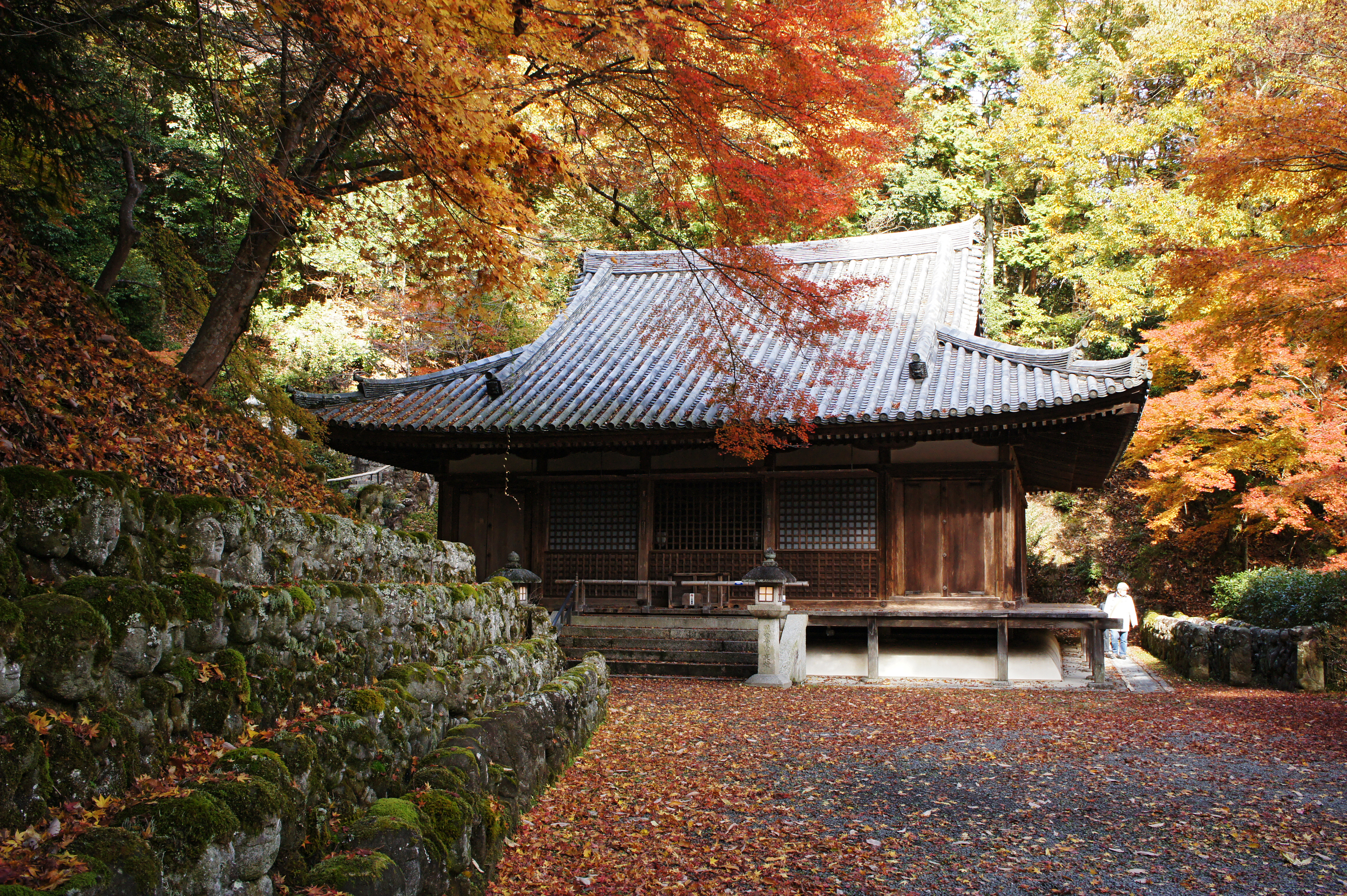
- The temple's main hall

Religion
- Affiliation: Tendai

Location
- Location: 2-5 Fukatani-chō; Saga Toriimoto; Ukyō-ku, Kyoto
- Country: Japan
- Interactive map of Otagi Nenbutsu-ji 愛宕念仏寺

Architecture
- Completed: Mid-eighth century

Website
- おたぎねんぶつじ

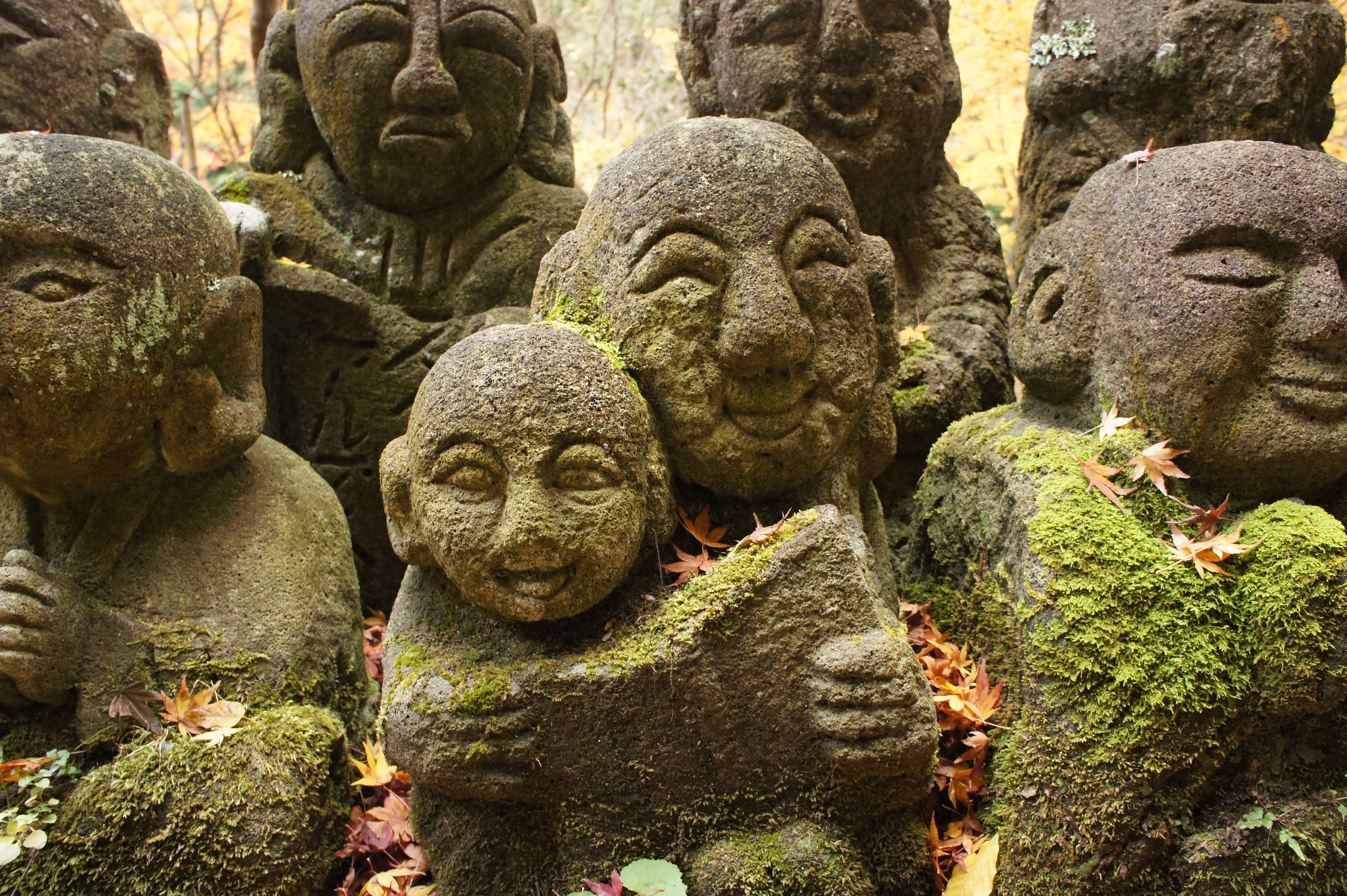
Rakan sculptures

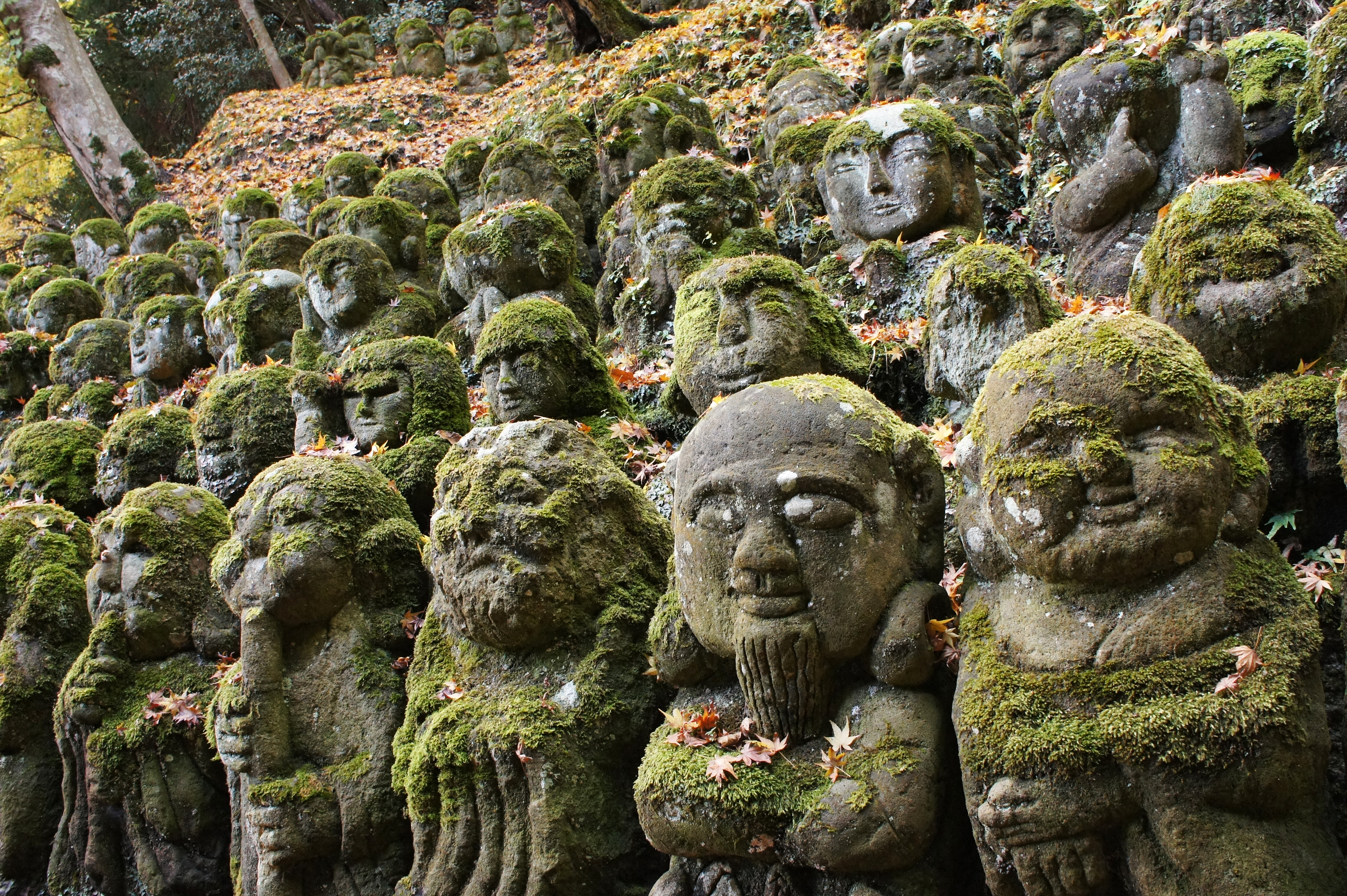
Rakan sculptures

Otagi Nenbutsu-ji (Japanese: 愛宕念仏寺) is a Buddhist temple located in the hillside of the Arashiyama neighborhood of Kyoto, Japan. It is known for the 1,200 moss-covered arhat statues that cover the hillside around the temple grounds.

== History ==
Otagi Nenbutsu-ji was originally founded by Empress Shōtoku around Kyoto's Gion district in the year 766. Though destroyed by the flooding of the Kamo River, it was rebuilt as an offshoot of Enryaku-ji, a nearby temple. In the 13th century, it was again destroyed during a civil war. Over time the temple fell into disrepair and was eventually moved to its current location in Arashiyama in 1922, in an attempt to save the core structure of the temple building. However, the temple received another serious blow in 1950 when it suffered typhoon damage.

== Restoration ==
In 1955, Kocho Nishimura (1915-2003), who had honed his craft as a sculptor and restorer of Buddhist statues before becoming a monk, was appointed head of Otagi Nenbutsuji, marking the start of the temple's remarkable transformation. Extensive renovation efforts, beginning in 1981, lasted a decade. During this period, much of the temple was taken apart, renovated, and restored.

A major endeavor during this time involved crafting 1,200 stone arhat statues, which now adorn the temple's surrounding hills. These arhat, disciples of Buddha, were carved by novices who traveled there to learn the art under Nishimura's direction. He encouraged them to express the distinct, intrinsic qualities of the stone, resulting in a diverse range of figures— some in solemn prayer, others depicting joy or laughter, or even incorporating elements reflective of the carvers' personal interests. This site uniquely blends the divine and the mundane, showcasing a collection of religious sculptures unmatched anywhere else in Japan.

== Grounds ==
The Otagi Nenbutsu-ji Temple is located on a hillside in the western part of Kyoto in the Arashiyama district. Due to its remote location, the temple is not well known other than to locals. The gate of the temple contains two fierce-looking Nio statues that welcome visitors at the entrance. Inside the temple, there are more than 1200 arhat, stone statues representing the disciples of Buddha. The arhat statues are the main attraction of the temple as they adorn the hillside surrounding the temple buildings.

== See also ==
- Glossary of Japanese Buddhism
