= Princess Shōshi (1286–1348) =

Princess Shōshi 奨子内親王

Empress consort of Japan (honorary)
- Tenure: 18 April – 16 November 1319
- Born: 28 September 1286; Heian-kyō (Kyōto)
- Died: 2 November 1348 (aged 62); Heian-kyō (Kyōto)
- House: Imperial House of Japan
- Father: Emperor Go-Uda
- Mother: Itsutsuji (Fujiwara) Chushi

Princess Shōshi or Princess Masako (奨子内親王, Shōshi (Masako) Naishinnō; 28 September 1286 – 2 November 1348) was a Japanese princess who briefly served as honorary empress for her younger brother Emperor Go-Daigo.

Princess Shōshi was the daughter of Emperor Go-Uda and court lady Itsutsuji (Fujiwara) Chushi. She served as Saiō for her half-brother Emperor Go-Nijō from 1306 to 1308. She was named honorary empress to her brother Emperor Go-Daigo in 1319.

In the same year, Shōshi ordained as a Buddhist nun and was given the Dharma name Shinrikaku (真理覚).

Japanese royalty
Preceded by Fujiwara no Kinshi	Empress consort of Japan (honorary); 1319	Succeeded by Saionji Kishi
