= Fujiwara no Kenshi (1057–1084) =

Empress consort of Japan
- Tenure: 16 July 1074 – 24 October 1084
- Born: 1057
- Died: October 24, 1084 (aged 26–27)
- Spouse: Emperor Shirakawa
- Issue: 5, including Princess Yasuko, Princess Reishi and Emperor Horikawa
- Clan: Minamoto (birth); Fujiwara (adoptive); Imperial House of Japan (marriage)
- Father: Minamoto no Akifusa (birth); Fujiwara no Morozane (adoptive)
- Mother: Minamoto no Takako (birth); Minamoto no Reiko (adoptive)

Fujiwara no Kenshi (1057–1084) was the empress consort of Emperor Shirakawa of Japan.

== Biography ==
She was a daughter of Minamoto Akifusa (源顕房), and adopted by Fujiwara no Morozane (藤原師実).

Issue

- Imperial Prince Atsufumi (敦文親王; 1075–1077)
- Imperial Princess Yasuko (媞子内親王) later Ikuhomon’in (郁芳門院)
- Imperial Princess Reishi (令子内親王) saigū
- Imperial Prince Taruhito (善仁親王) later Emperor Horikawa
- Imperial Princess Shinshi (禛子内親王; 1081–1156)—Tsuchimikado Saiin (土御門斎院)

== Notes ==
Japanese royalty
| Preceded by Princess Kaoruko | Empress consort of Japan; 1074–1084 | Succeeded by Princess Yasuko |
