= Fujiwara no Moromichi =

Japanese noble

Fujiwara no Moromichi

Fujiwara no Moromichi (藤原 師通; 1062 – July 18, 1099) was a Japanese statesman, known for his opposition to the Insei system. He was the son of Fujiwara no Morozane.

== Career ==
Moromichi's career spanned the years from 1069 to his death in 1099. He was made Regent (Kampaku) in 1094. During his lifetime he was seen as being a good and virtuous man, who ruled justly and with strength. The country was at peace during his time in office, and he was well-read, an ardent student.

Moromichi was an opponent of the system of cloistered rule began by Emperor Go-Sanjō. He was hostile to the cloistered emperor himself, Shirakawa and the class of lesser aristocrats, 'new men', who supported him. The titular emperor, Horikawa, was joined with Moromichi in this opposition.

Notably, Moromichi took action against the monks who at that time terrorised the Court in the name of their gods and spirits. They came down from the mountains, where their temples were situated, in armed bands and invaded the capital. No previous Regent or other statesman had possessed the courage to oppose them – Moromichi was the first to take action.

He also authored a memoir titled Go-Nijō kampaku-ki., signed under his nickname Go-Nijō Kampaku

== Death ==
Due to his opposing the monks, a legend developed around Moromichi's fatal illness. A Shinto ritualist had cursed him in front of an icon, and it was believed that Moromichi dreaded this curse so much that boils broke out on his skin. Though they briefly disappeared, they returned and this time killed him. After his death it was said that groans could be heard from beneath a stone, midway between the Ikuta Shrine and Hachiōji.

== Bibliography ==
- Sansom, George (1958). A History of Japan to 1334. Stanford University Press. ISBN 978-0804705233.
