= Emperor Horikawa =

Emperor of Japan from 1087 to 1107

Emperor Horikawa; 堀河天皇
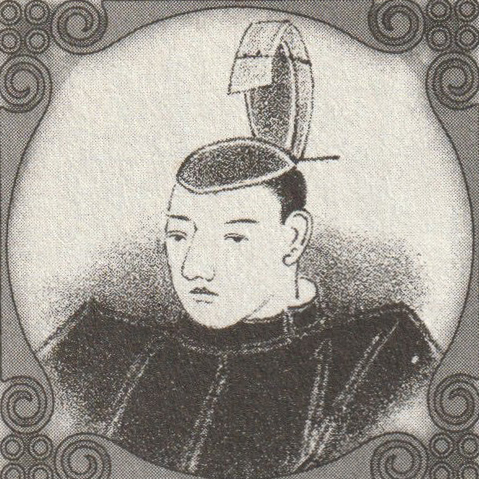
- Imaginary portrait by Kōtarō Miyake, c. 1894

Emperor of Japan
- Reign: January 3, 1087 – August 9, 1107
- Enthronement: January 16, 1087
- Predecessor: Shirakawa
- Successor: Toba
- Born: August 8, 1079
- Died: August 9, 1107 (aged 28); Horikawa-den palace（堀川殿）
- Burial: Nochi no Enkyō-ji no misasagi (後円教寺陵) (Kyoto)
- Spouse: Tokushi (m. 1093)
- Issue among others...: Emperor Toba; Princess Kishi
Posthumous name
- Tsuigō: Emperor Horikawa (堀河院 or 堀河天皇)
- House: Imperial House of Japan
- Father: Emperor Shirakawa
- Mother: Fujiwara no Kenshi

Emperor Horikawa (堀河天皇, Horikawa-tennō; August 8, 1079 – August 9, 1107) was the 73rd emperor of Japan, according to the traditional order of succession.

Horikawa's reign spanned the years from 1087 through 1107.

== Biography ==
Before his ascension to the Chrysanthemum Throne, his personal name (imina) was Taruhito-shinnō (善仁親王). He was also known as Yoshihito-tennō.

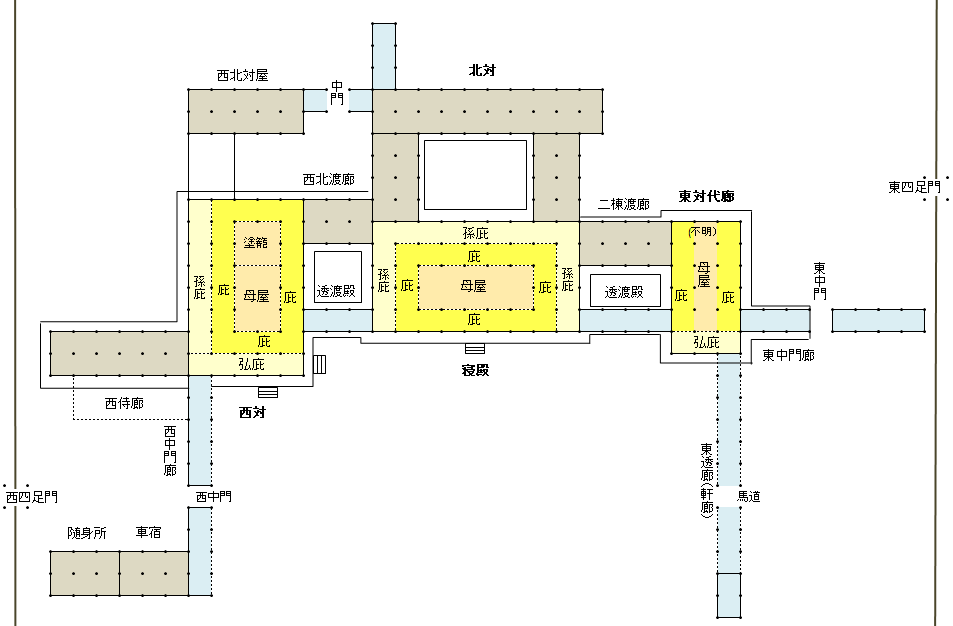
Outline of Horikawa-den palace (堀河殿) served as a temporary imperial palace for Emperor Shirakawa, Emperor Horikawa, and Emperor Toba, but Emperor Horikawa, in particular, grew up, received his imperial ascension, and died here.

Horikawa was the son of Emperor Shirakawa. His mother was Fujiwara no Kenshi (藤原賢子), adopted daughter of Fujiwara Morozane (藤原師実). His wet nurse was a different namesake Fujiwara no Kenshi (藤原兼子).

=== Empresses, consorts, and issue ===
- Empress (Chūgū): Imperial Princess Tokushi (篤子内親王), Emperor Go-Sanjo’s daughter
- Consort (Nyōgo): Fujiwara no Ishi (藤原苡子; 1076-1103), Fujiwara no Sanesue’s daughter
  - Imperial Prince Munehito (宗仁親王) later Emperor Toba
- Lady-in-waiting (Naishi): Princess Jinshi (仁子女王; d.1126), Prince Yasusuke’s daughter
  - Imperial Princess Soshi (悰子内親王, 1099–1162)
- Lady-in-waiting (Naishi): Fujiwara Muneko (藤原宗子; d.1129), Fujiwara Takamune’s daughter
  - Kangyō (寛暁; 1103–1159)
- Lady-in-waiting (Naishi): Fujiwara Tokitsune’s daughter
  - Imperial Prince Priest Saiun (最雲法親王; 1105–1162) head priest of the Tendai sect
- Mother Unknown
  - Imperial Princess Kishi (喜子内親王)
  - Imperial Princess Kaishi (懐子内親王)

== Rule ==
After becoming crown prince, he acceded to the throne upon the abdication of his father Emperor Shirakawa on January 3, 1087 (Ōtoku 3). His father's kampaku Fujiwara Morozane became regent, and Horikawa's reign was overshadowed by the cloistered rule of his father. Horikawa filled his reign with scholarship, poetry, and music.

When Horikawa's empress-consort Fujiwara no Ishi (藤原苡子) died in 1103, his son the Imperial Prince Munehito was taken to be raised by the retired Emperor Shirakawa. This son later succeeded Horikawa to the throne and was later known as Emperor Toba.

Horikawa died at the age of 28 on August 9, 1107 (Kajō 2). He is among the seven emperors entombed near Ryōan-ji in Kyoto. He is traditionally venerated at the Nochi no Yenkyō-ji no misasagi memorial Shinto shrine; this site has been designated as Horikawa's mausoleum by the Imperial Household Agency.

=== Eras ===
The years of Horikawa's reign are more specifically identified by more than one era name or nengō.

- Ōtoku (1084–1087)
- Kanji (1087–1094)
- Kahō (1094–1096)
- Eichō (1096–1097)
- Jōtoku (1097–1099)
- Kōwa (1099–1104)
- Chōji (1104–1106)
- Kajō (1106–1108)

=== Kugyō ===
During Horikawa's reign, the high-ranking kugyō of the imperial court included:

- Sesshō/Daijō-daijin Fujiwara Morozane (1043–1101)
- Kampaku/Nidaijin Fujiwara Moromichi (1062–1099)
- Kampaku/Udaijin/Dainagon Fujiwara Tadazane

== Ancestry ==
Ancestors of Emperor Horikawa

8. Emperor Go-Suzaku (1009-1045)
4. Emperor Go-Sanjō (1034-1073)
9. Princess Teishi (1013-1094)
2. Emperor Shirakawa (1053-1130)
10. Fujiwara no Kinnari (999-1043)
5. Fujiwara no Shigeko (d. 1062)
11. Fujiwara
1. Emperor Horikawa
12. Minamoto no Morofusa (1008-1077)
6. Minamoto no Akifusa (1037-1094)
13. Fujiwara no Sonshi (1003-1087)
3. Fujiwara no Kenshi (1057-1084)
14. Minamoto no Takatoshi (1025-1075)
7. Minamoto no Takako

== Notes ==
Japanese Imperial kamon — a stylized chrysanthemum blossom

== See also ==
- Emperor of Japan
- List of Emperors of Japan
- Imperial cult
- Emperor Go-Horikawa

Regnal titles
Preceded by Emperor Shirakawa	Emperor of Japan: Horikawa; 1087–1107	Succeeded by Emperor Toba
