= Emperor Shirakawa =

Emperor of Japan from 1073 to 1087

Emperor Shirakawa 白河天皇
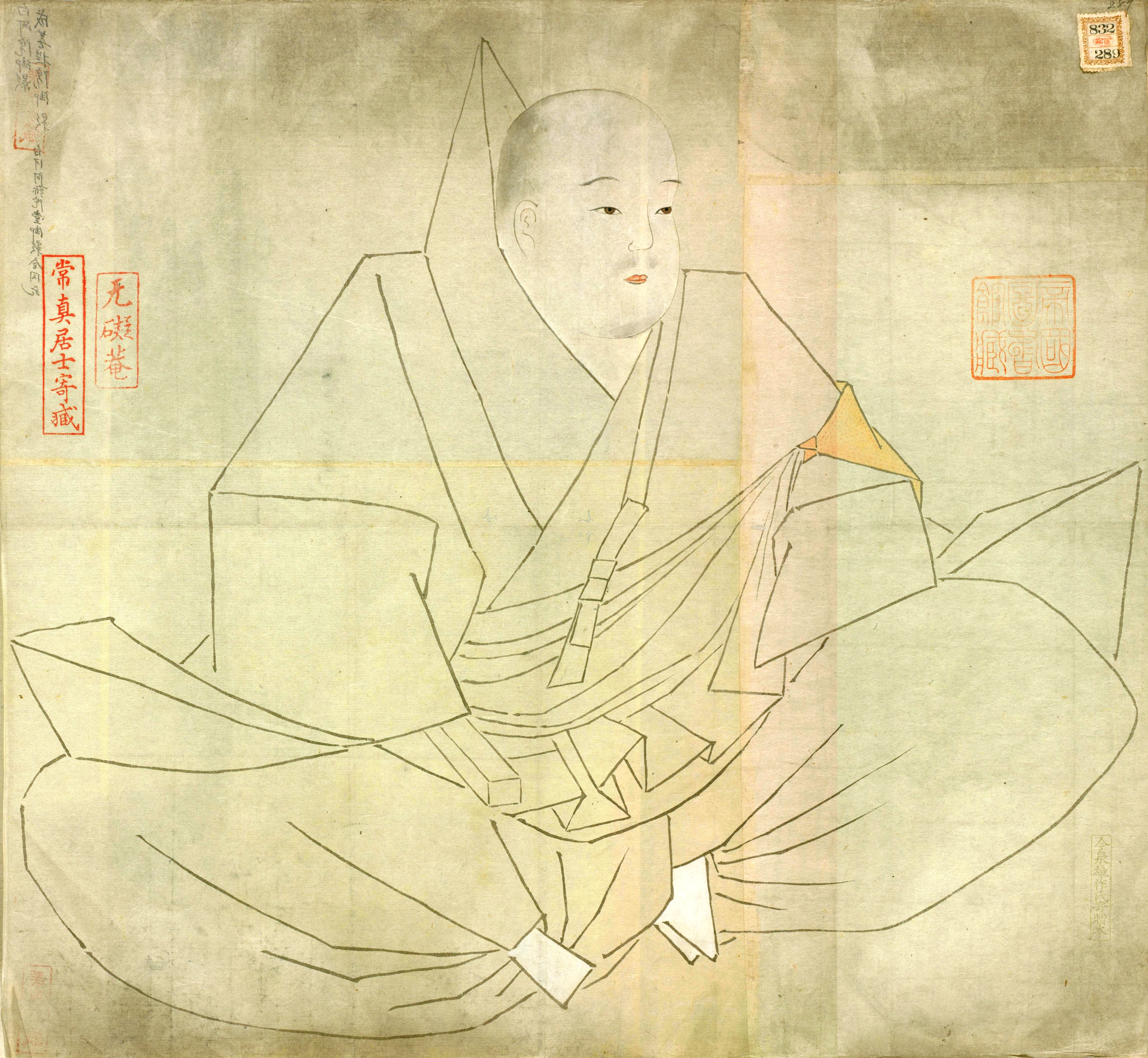

Emperor of Japan
- Reign: 18 January 1073 – 3 January 1087
- Enthronement: 8 February 1073
- Predecessor: Go-Sanjō
- Successor: Horikawa
- Born: 7 July 1053
- Died: 24 July 1129 (aged 76)
- Burial: Jōbodai-in no misasagi (成菩提院陵) (Kyoto)
- Spouse: Fujiwara no Kenshi
- Issue more...: Princess Yasuko; Princess Reishi; Emperor Horikawa
Posthumous name
- Tsuigō: Emperor Shirakawa (白河院 or 白河天皇)
- House: Imperial House of Japan
- Father: Emperor Go-Sanjō
- Mother: Fujiwara Shigeko

Emperor Shirakawa (白河天皇, Shirakawa-tennō; 7 July 1053 – 24 July 1129) was the 72nd emperor of Japan, according to the traditional order of succession.

Shirakawa's reign lasted from 1073 to 1087.

== Genealogy ==
Before his ascension to the Chrysanthemum Throne, his personal name (imina) was Sadahito-shinnō (貞仁親王).

He was the eldest son of Emperor Go-Sanjō and Fujiwara Shigeko (藤原茂子).

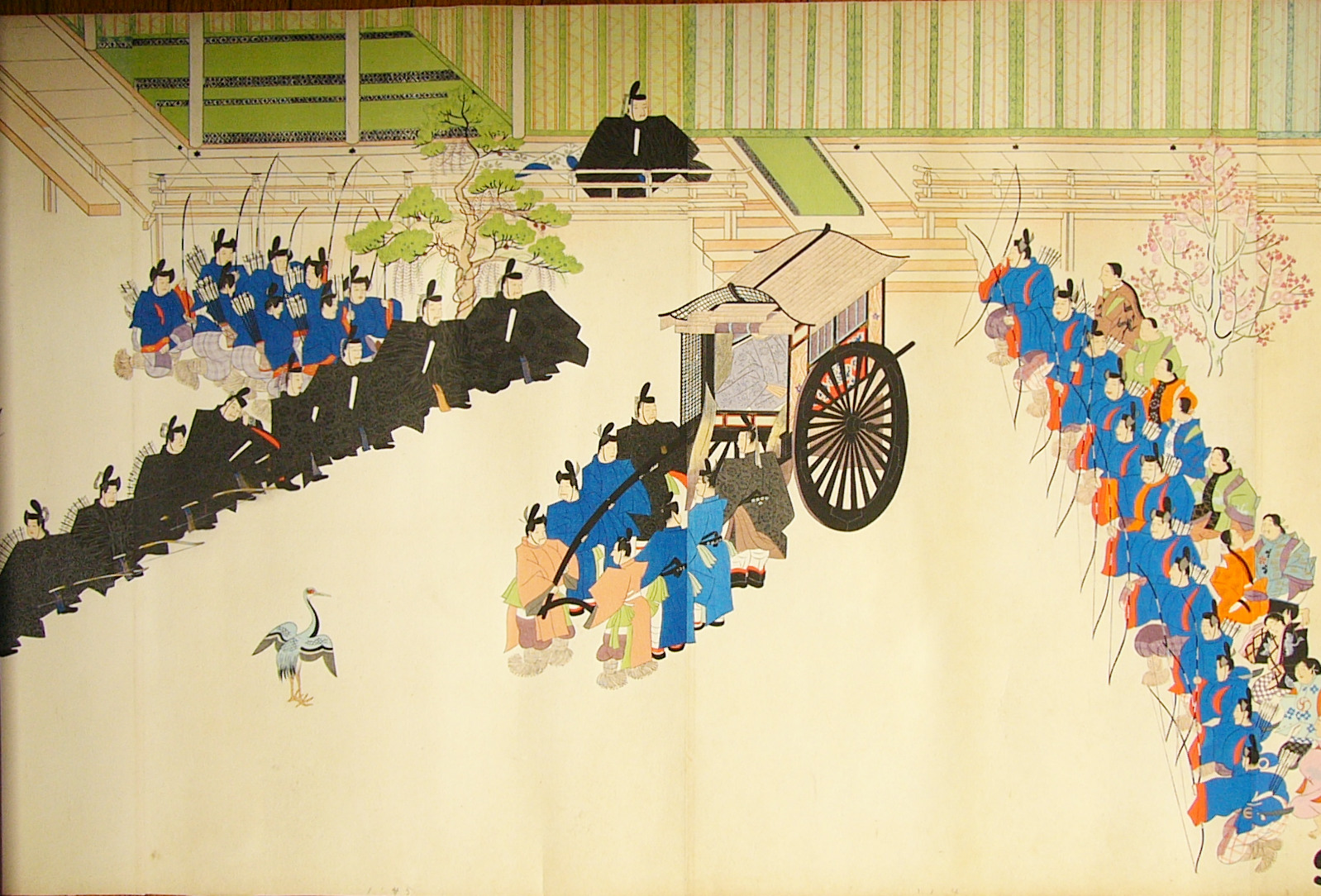
Retired Emperor Shirakawa visited Kasuga-taisha temple.

Shirakawa had one Empress and one Imperial Consort and nine Imperial sons and daughters.

- Empress (chūgū): Fujiwara no Kenshi (藤原賢子)—Minamoto Akifusa‘s daughter, adopted by Fujiwara Morozane
  - First Son: Imperial Prince Atsufumi (敦文親王; 1075–1077)
  - First Daughter: Imperial Princess Yasuko (媞子内親王) later Ikuhomon’in (郁芳門院)
  - Third Daughter: Imperial Princess Reishi (令子内親王) saigū
  - Third Son: Imperial Prince Taruhito (善仁親王) later Emperor Horikawa
  - Fourth Daughter: Imperial Princess Shinshi (禛子内親王; 1081–1156)—Tsuchimikado Saiin (土御門斎院)
- Consort (Nyogo): Fujiwara Michiko (藤原道子; 1042–1132), Fujiwara no Yoshinaga‘s daughter
  - Second Daughter: Imperial Princess Yoshiko (善子内親王; 1076–1131) Rokkaku >saigū at the Grand Shrine of Ise
- Lady-in-Waiting: Fujiwara Tsuneko (藤原経子), Fujiwara no Tsunehira's daughter
  - Second Son: Imperial Prince Priest Kakugyō (覚行法親王; 1075–1105)
- Court Lady: Minamoto Raishi (源師子; 1070–1148), Minamoto Akifusa's daughter
  - Fourth Son: Imperial Prince Priest Kakuhō (覚法法親王; 1092–1153)
- Minamoto Yoriko (源頼子), Minamoto Yoritsune's daughter
  - Fifth Daughter: Imperial Princess Kanshi (官子内親王; b.1090)—Saiin (斎院)
- Fujiwara Suesane's daughter
  - Sixth Daughter: Imperial Princess Junko (恂子内親王; 1093-1132)
- Kasuga-dono (春日殿), Fujiwara Morokane's daughter
  - Fifth Son: Imperial Prince Priest Shōe (聖恵法親王; 1094–1137)
- Minamoto Masanaga's daughter
  - Gyōkei (行慶; 1101–1165)
- Bizen-dono (備前), Minamoto Arimune's daughter
  - Engyō (円行, b.1128)
- Minamoto Akifusa's daughter
  - Josho (静證)
- Gion Nyōgo (祇園女御)
- Gion Nyōgo‘s younger sister
- Rō-no-Kata (廊御方), Fujiwara Michisue's daughter
- Kamo Nyōgo (賀茂女御, 1070 - 1148), Kamo Shigesuke's daughter
- Kamo Nyōgo‘s younger sister, Kamo Shigesuke's daughter

== Events of Shirakawa's life ==
He was the first emperor to ostensibly retire to a monastery, but in fact continue to exert considerable influence over his successor. This process would become known as cloistered rule.

When he was very young, his relations with his father were very cold but loving and in 1068, when his father was enthroned, he was proclaimed a shinnō (Imperial Prince), becoming Imperial Prince Sadahito. In 1069, he became Crown Prince and in due course, he became emperor at the age of 19.

- January 18, 1073 (Enkyū 4, on the 8th day of the 12th month): In the 5th year of Emperor Go-Sanjō-tennō's reign (桓武天皇六年), the emperor abdicated; and the succession (‘‘senso’’) was received by his son. Shortly thereafter, Emperor Shirakawa is said to have acceded to the throne (‘‘sokui’’).

A kampaku was put in place, but Shirakawa attempted to rule directly, like his father. He attempted to regulate the shōen (manor) system, working to weaken the influence of the sekkan lines.

- 1074 (Jōhō 1, 1st month): Dainagon Minamoto- no Takakune asked to be relieved of his duties because of his age. He was 71, and he wanted to retire to Uji. In his retirement, he was visited by many friends with whom he pursued research into the history of Japan. He brought this work together in a book.
- 1074 (Jōhō 1, 7th day of the 2nd month): The former kampaku Fujiwara Yorimichi died at the age of 83. In this same period, his sister, the widow of Emperor Ichijo, died at the age of 86.
- 1074 (Jōhō 1, 3rd day of the 10th month): Empress Jōtōmon-in died at the age of 86.
- 1077 (Jōryaku 1, 1st month): Shirakawa went to the Kamo Shrines; and he visited Kiyomizu-dera and other Buddhist temples.
- 1077 (Jōryaku 1, 2nd month): Udaijin Minamoto no Morofusa died of an ulcer at the age of 70.
- 1077 (Jōryaku 1): The emperor caused Hosshō-ji (dedicated to the "Superiority of Buddhist Law") to be built at Shirakawa in fulfillment of a sacred vow. This temple became only the first of a series of "sacred vow" temples to be created by Imperial decree. Hosshō-ji's nine-storied pagoda would become the most elaborate Imperial-sponsored temple structure ever erected up to this time.
- 1079 (Jōryaku 3, i10th month): The emperor visited the Fushimi Inari-taisha at the foot of Mount Fushimi and the Yasaka Shrine.
- May 26, 1081 (Eihō 1, 15th day of the 4th month): The Buddhist Temple of Miidera was set on fire by the monks of a rival sect on Mt. Hiei.
- 1081 (Eihō 1, 4th day of the 6th month): Miidera was burned again by monks from Mt. Hiei.
- 1083 (Eihō 3, 10th month): At Hosshō-ji, construction begins on a nine-story pagoda.
- 1084 (Ōtoku 1, 9th month): The empress Kenshi, the emperor's principal consort, died. Shirakawa was afflicted with great grief, and for a time, he turned over the administration of the government to his ministers.
- 1087 (Ōtoku 3, 9th month): Shirakawa announced his intention to abdicate in favor of his son.
- January 3, 1087 (Ōtoku 3, 26th day of the 11th month): Shirakawa formally abdicated, and he took the title Daijō-tennō. Shirakawa had personally occupied the throne for 14 years; and for the next 43 years, he would exercise broad powers in what will come to be known as cloistered rule.

Go-Sanjō had wished for Shirakawa's younger half-brother to succeed him to the throne. In 1085, this half-brother died of an illness; and Shirakawa's own son, Taruhito-shinnō (善仁親王) became Crown Prince.

On the same day that Taruhito was proclaimed as his heir, Shirakawa abdicated, and Taruhito became Emperor Horikawa. The now-retired Emperor Shirakawa was the first to attempt what became customary cloistered rule. He exercised power, ruling indirectly from the Shirakawa-in (lit. "White River Mansion/Temple"); nevertheless, nominal sesshō and kampaku offices continued to exist for a long time.

- 1087 (Kanji 1, 5th month): Daijō-tennō Shirakawa retired himself to Uji.
- 1088 (Kanji 2, in the 1st month): The emperor paid a visit to his father's home.
- 1088 (Kanji 2, 10th month): Shirakawa visited the temples at Mt. Hiei.
- 1088 (Kanji 2, 14th day of the 12th): The sesshō Fujiwara Morozane was given additional honors with the further title of daijō-daijin. In this context, it matters a great deal that the mother of Emperor Horikawa, formerly the daughter of udaijin Minamoto no Akifusa, was also formerly the adopted child of Morozane.
- 1089 (Kanji 3, 5th month): Shirakawa made a second visit to Mt. Hiei; and this time, he stayed seven days.
- 1090 (Kanji 4, 12th month): Fujiwara Morozane was relieved of his responsibilities as sesshō and he was simultaneously named kampaku.
- 1094 (Kanji 8, 8th day of the 3rd month): Morozane resigned from his position as kampaku.
- 1095 (Kahō 2, i4th month): Emperor Horikawa paid visits to the Shinto Iwashimizu Shrine and to the Shinto Kamo Shrines.
- 1095 (Kahō 2, 8th month): The emperor was stricken with intermittent fevers; and he ordered prayers to be offered for his return to good health. After Horikawa recovered his health, he was generous and appreciative to the Buddhist priests who had prayed for his recovery.
- 1095 (Kahō 2, 11th month): The Buddhist priests of Mt. Hiei came down from their mountain to protest a dispute with Minamoto Yoshitsuna and other government officials which had led to military action and bloodshed. The priests carried a portable shrine as far as the central hall of Enryaku-ji, where a curse was laid on daijō-daijin Fujiwara Moromichi.
- 1096 (Kahō 3, 9th day of the 11th month): Former-Emperor Shirakawa entered the Buddhist priesthood at the age of 44 and received the Dharma name Yūkan (融観).

In 1096, on the occasion of his daughter's death, Shirakawa entered a monastery under the name of Yūkan (融観); and thus, he became a hō-ō (法皇), which is the title accorded to a former emperor who has become a monk.

After the death of Emperor Horikawa, Shirakawa's grandson became Emperor Toba. Shirakawa was still alive when Toba abdicated in turn to his son, who became Emperor Sutoku. By the time of his death in 1129, he had ruled as cloistered Emperor for 41 years and through the reigns of three emperors who were effectively little more than figureheads.

This emperor's posthumous name comes from Shirakawa-in (白河院), the name of the residence from which he conducted his cloistered rule after abdicating the throne. Another name was Rokujō no Mikado (六条帝, Mikado being an old name for the Emperor of Japan).

=== Kugyō ===
Kugyō (公卿) is a collective term for the very few most powerful men attached to the court of the Emperor of Japan in pre-Meiji eras. Even during those years in which the court's actual influence outside the palace walls was minimal, the hierarchic organization persisted.

In general, this elite group included only three to four men at a time. These were hereditary courtiers whose experience and background would have brought them to the pinnacle of a life's career. During Shirakawa's reign, this apex of the Daijō-kan included:

- Kampaku, Fujiwara Norimichi, 997–1075.
- Kampaku, Fujiwara Morozane, 1042–1101.
- Sadaijin, Fujiwara Morozane.
- Udaijin
- Nadaijin, Fujiwara Moromichi, 1062–1099.
- Dainagon, Minamoto no Takakuni.

== Eras of Shirakawa's reign ==
The years of Shirakawa's reign are more specifically identified by more than one era name or nengō.

- Enkyū (1069–1074)
- Jōhō (1074–1077)
- Jōryaku (1077–1081)
- Eihō (1081–1084)
- Ōtoku (1084–1087)

== Ancestry ==
Ancestors of Emperor Shirakawa

8. Emperor Ichijō (980-1011)
4. Emperor Go-Suzaku (1009-1045)
9. Empress Shōshi (988-1074)
2. Emperor Go-Sanjō (1034-1073)
10. Emperor Sanjō (976-1017)
5. Princess Teishi (1013-1094)
11. Fujiwara no Kenshi (994-1027)
1. Emperor Shirakawa
12. Fujiwara no Sanenari (975-1045)
6. Fujiwara no Kinnari (999-1043)
13. Fujiwara
3. Fujiwara no Shigeko (d. 1062)
7. Fujiwara

== Notes ==
Japanese Imperial kamon — a stylized chrysanthemum blossom

== See also ==
- Emperor of Japan
- List of Emperors of Japan
- Imperial cult
- Emperor Go-Shirakawa

Regnal titles
Preceded by Emperor Go-Sanjō	Emperor of Japan: Shirakawa; 1073–1087	Succeeded by Emperor Horikawa
