= List of Daijō-daijin =

The following is a list of Daijō-daijin.

== Nara period ==
- 671–672 Prince Ōtomo (大友皇子) (648–672)
- 690–696 Prince Takechi (高市皇子) (654–696)
- 703–705 Prince Osakabe (刑部親王) (?–705) - Chi-Daijō-kanji (知太政官事)
- 705–715 Prince Hozumi (穂積親王) (?–715) - Chi-Daijō-kanji (知太政官事)
- 720–735 Prince Toneri (舎人親王) (676–735) - Chi-Daijō-kanji (知太政官事)
- 737–745 Prince Suzuka (鈴鹿王) (?–745) - Chi-Daijō-kanji (知太政官事)
- 760–764 Emi no Oshikatsu (恵美押勝) (Fujiwara no Nakamaro) (藤原仲麻呂) (706–764) - Taishi (太師)
- 765–766 Dōkyō (道鏡) (700?–772)

== Heian period ==
- 857–872 Fujiwara no Yoshifusa (藤原良房) (804–872) (Chūjin-kō, 忠仁公)
- 880–891 Fujiwara no Mototsune (藤原基経) (836–891) (Shōsen-kō, 昭宣公)
- 936–949 Fujiwara no Tadahira (藤原忠平) (880–949) (Teishin-kō, 貞信公)
- 967–970 Fujiwara no Saneyori (藤原実頼) (900–970) (Seishin-kō, 清慎公)
- 971–972 Fujiwara no Koretada (藤原伊尹) (924–972) (Kentoku-kō, 謙徳公)
- 974–977 Fujiwara no Kanemichi (藤原兼通) (925–977) (Chūgi-kō, 忠義公)
- 978–989 Fujiwara no Yoritada (藤原頼忠) (924–989) (Rengi-kō, 廉義公)
- 990 Fujiwara no Kaneie (藤原兼家) (929–990)
- 991–992 Fujiwara no Tamemitsu (藤原為光) (942–992) (Kōtoku-kō, 恒徳公)
- 1017–1018 Fujiwara no Michinaga (藤原道長) (966–1028)
- 1021–1029 Fujiwara no Kinsue (藤原公季) (957–1029) (Jingi-kō, 仁義公)
- 1061–1062 Fujiwara no Yorimichi (藤原頼通) (992–1074)
- 1070–1071 Fujiwara no Norimichi (藤原教通) (996–1075)
- 1080–1089 Fujiwara no Nobunaga (藤原信長) (1022–1094)
- 1112–1113 Fujiwara no Tadazane (藤原忠実) (1079–1162)
- 1122–1124 Minamoto no Masazane (源雅実) (1059–1127)
- 1129 Fujiwara no Tadamichi (藤原忠通) (1097–1164)
- 1149–1150 Fujiwara no Tadamichi (藤原忠通) (1097–1164)
- 1150–1157 Fujiwara no Saneyuki (藤原実行) (1080–1162) (Sanjō family, 三条家)
- 1157–1160 Fujiwara no Munesuke (藤原宗輔) (1077–1162) (2nd son of Fujiwara no Munetoshi)
- 1160–1165 Fujiwara no Koremichi (藤原伊通) (1093–1165) (2nd son of Fujiwara no Munemichi)
- 1167 Taira no Kiyomori (平清盛) (1118–1181)
- 1168–1170 Fujiwara no Tadamasa (藤原忠雅) (1124–1193) (Kazan'in family, 花山院家)
- 1170–1171 Fujiwara no Motofusa (藤原基房) (1145–1231) (Matsudono family, 松殿家)
- 1177–1179 Fujiwara no Moronaga (藤原師長) (1138–1192) (2nd son of Fujiwara no Yorinaga)
- 1189–1190 Fujiwara no Kanezane (藤原兼実) (1149–1207) (Kujō family, 九条家)
- 1191–1196 Fujiwara no Kanefusa (藤原兼房) (1153–1217)

== Kamakura period ==
- 1199–1204 Fujiwara no Yorizane (藤原頼実) (1155–1225) (Ōimikado family, 大炊御門家)
- 1205–1206 Fujiwara no Yoshitsune (藤原良経) (1169–1206) (Kujō family, 九条家)
- 1218–1221 Fujiwara no Kinfusa (藤原公房) (1179–1249) (Sanjō family, 三条家)
- 1221 Fujiwara no Michiie (藤原道家) (1193–1252) (Kujō family, 九条家)
- 1221 Fujiwara no Kinfusa (藤原公房) (1179–1249) (Sanjō family, 三条家)
- 1221 Fujiwara no Iezane (藤原家実) (1179–1243) (Konoe family, 近衛家)
- 1222–1223 Fujiwara no Kintsune (藤原公経) (1171–1244) (Saionji family, 西園寺家)
- 1238–1239 Fujiwara no Yoshihira (藤原良平) (1184–1240) (Kujō family, 九条家)
- 1241–1242 Fujiwara no Kanetsune (藤原兼経) (1210–1259) (Konoe family, 近衛家)
- 1246–1247 Fujiwara no Saneuji (藤原実氏) (1194–1269) (Saionji family, 西園寺家)
- 1247–1248 Minamoto no Michimitsu (源通光) (1187–1248) (Koga family, 久我家) (3rd son of Minamoto no Michichika)
- 1252–1253 Fujiwara no Kanehira (藤原兼平) (1228–1294) (Takatsukasa family, 鷹司家) (4th son of Fujiwara no Iezane)
- 1253–1254 Fujiwara no Sanemoto (藤原実基) (1201–1273) (Tokudaiji family, 徳大寺家)
- 1262 Fujiwara no Kinsuke (藤原公相) (1223–1267) (Saionji family, 西園寺家)
- 1275–1276 Fujiwara no Michimasa (藤原通雅) (1233–1276) (Kazan'in family, 花山院家)
- 1277 Fujiwara no Kanehira (藤原兼平) (1228–1294) (Takatsukasa family, 鷹司家)
- 1285–1287 Fujiwara no Mototada (藤原基忠) (1247–1313) (Takatsukasa family, 鷹司家)
- 1289–1290 Minamoto no Mototomo (源基具) (1230–1297) (Horikawa family, 堀川家)
- 1292–1293 Fujiwara no Sanekane (藤原実兼) (1249–1322) (Saionji family, 西園寺家)
- 1299 Fujiwara no Kinmori (藤原公守) (1249–1317) (Tōin family, 洞院家)
- 1299–1300 Fujiwara no Kanemoto (藤原兼基) (1268–1334) (Nijō family, 二条家)
- 1301–1302 Minamoto no Sadazane (源定実) (1240–1306) (Tsuchimikado family, 土御門家)
- 1302–1304 Fujiwara no Kintaka (藤原公孝) (1253–1305) (Tokudaiji family, 徳大寺家)
- 1307–1309 Fujiwara no Saneie (藤原実家) (1250–1314) (Ichijō family, 一条家)
- 1309–1311 Fujiwara no Nobutsugu (藤原信嗣) (1236–1311) (Ōimikado family, 大炊御門家)
- 1311 Fujiwara no Fuyuhira (藤原冬平) (1275–1327) (Takatsukasa family, 鷹司家)
- 1318–1319 Fujiwara no Saneshige (藤原実重) (1259–1329) (Sanjō family, 三条家)
- 1319–1323 Minamoto no Michio (源通雄) (1257–1329) (Koga family, 久我家)
- 1323–1327 Fujiwara no Fuyuhira (藤原冬平) (1275–1327) (Takatsukasa family, 鷹司家)
- 1332–1333 Fujiwara no Kanesue (藤原兼季) (1281–1339) (Imadegawa family, 今出川家) (4th son of Fujiwara no Sanekane)

== Muromachi period ==
- 1341–1342 Minamoto no Nagamichi (源長通) (1280–1353) (Koga family, 久我家)
- 1348–1350 Fujiwara no Kinkata (藤原公賢) (1291–1360) (Tōin family, 洞院家)
- 1366–1368 Minamoto no Michisuke (源通相) (1326–1371) (Koga family, 久我家)
- 1381–1387 Fujiwara no Yoshimoto (藤原良基) (1320–1388) (Nijō family, 二条家)
- 1394 Fujiwara no Sanetoki (藤原実時) (1338–1404) (Tokudaiji family, 徳大寺家)
- 1395 Minamoto no Yoshimitsu (源義満) (1358–1408) (Ashikaga family, 足利義満)
- 1395–1396 Minamoto no Tomomichi (源具通) (1342–1397) (Koga family, 久我家)
- 1402–1407 Fujiwara no Sanefuyu (藤原実冬) (1354–1411) (Sanjō family, 三条家)
- 1420 Fujiwara no Kintoshi (藤原公俊) (1371–1428) (Tokudaiji family, 徳大寺家)
- 1432–1433 Fujiwara no Mochimoto (藤原持基) (1390–1445) (Nijō family, 二条家)
- 1446–1450 Fujiwara no Kaneyoshi (藤原兼良) (1402–1480) (Ichijō family, 一条家)
- 1452–1453 Minamoto no Kiyomichi (源清通) (1393–1453) (Koga family, 久我家)
- 1455–1457 Fujiwara no Kinna (藤原公名) (1410–1468) (Saionji family, 西園寺家)
- 1458–1460 Fujiwara no Mochimichi (藤原持通) (1416–1493) (Nijō family, 二条家)
- 1462–1463 Fujiwara no Fusatsugu (藤原房嗣) (1402–1488) (Konoe family, 近衛家)
- 1481–1482 Minamoto no Michihiro (源通博) (1426–1482) (Koga family, 久我家)
- 1485 Fujiwara no Masahira (藤原政平) (1445–1517) (Takatsukasa family, 鷹司家)
- 1488–1490 Fujiwara no Masaie (藤原政家) (1444–1505) (Konoe family, 近衛家)
- 1493–1497 Fujiwara no Fuyuyoshi (藤原冬良) (1464–1514) (Ichijō family, 一条家)
- 1510–1511 Fujiwara no Saneatsu (藤原実淳) (1445–1533) (Tokudaiji family, 徳大寺家)
- 1514–1517 Fujiwara no Hisamichi (藤原尚通) (1472–1544) (Konoe family, 近衛家)
- 1518–1521 Fujiwara no Masanaga (藤原政長) (1451–1525) (Kazan'in family, 花山院家)
- 1525–1533 Fujiwara no Taneie (藤原稙家) (1503–1566) (Konoe family, 近衛家)
- 1535–1536 Fujiwara no Saneka (藤原実香) (1469–1558) (Sanjō family, 三条家)
- 1538–1542 Fujiwara no Taneie (藤原稙家) (1503–1566) (Konoe family, 近衛家)
- 1542–1545 Fujiwara no Tadafuyu (藤原忠冬) (1509–1546) (Takatsukasa family, 鷹司家)
- 1545–1548 Fujiwara no Fusamichi (藤原房通) (1509–1556) (Ichijō family, 一条家)
- 1548–1553 Fujiwara no Haruyoshi (藤原晴良) (1526–1579) (Nijō family, 二条家)
- 1553–1568 ?

== Azuchi-Momoyama period ==
- 1568–1578 Fujiwara no Haruyoshi (藤原晴良) (1526–1579) (Nijō family, 二条家)
- 1578–1582 Taira no Nobunaga (平信長) (1534–1582) (Oda family, 織田氏, Posthumous promotion in 1582.)
- 1582–1587 Fujiwara no Sakihisa (藤原前久) (1536–1612) (Konoe family, 近衛家)
- 1587–1598 Fujiwara no Hideyoshi (藤原秀吉) (1537–1598) (Toyotomi family, 豊臣秀吉)

== Edo period ==
- 1616 Minamoto no Ieyasu (源家康) (1543–1616) (Tokugawa family, 徳川家康)
- 1709–1710 Fujiwara no Motohiro (藤原基熙) (1648–1722) (Konoe family, 近衛家)
- 1711 Fujiwara no Iehiro (藤原家熙) (1667–1736) (Konoe family, 近衛家)
- 1733–1734 Fujiwara no Iehisa (藤原家久) (1687–1737) (Konoe family, 近衛家)
- 1746–1751 Fujiwara no Kaneka (藤原兼香) (1693–1751) (Ichijō family, 一条家)
- 1768–1770 Fujiwara no Uchisaki (藤原内前) (1728–1785) (Konoe family, 近衛家)
- 1771–1778 Fujiwara no Uchisaki (藤原内前) (1728–1785) (Konoe family, 近衛家)
- 1781 Fujiwara no Naozane (藤原尚実) (1717–1787) (Kujō family, 九条家)
- 1842–1848 Fujiwara no Masamichi (藤原政通) (1789–1868) (Takatsukasa family, 鷹司家)

== Meiji period ==
- 1871–1885 Sanjo Sanetomi (三条実美) (1837–1891)

== See also ==
- Sesshō and Kampaku
