= Emperor Kameyama =

Emperor of Japan from 1260 to 1274

Emperor Kameyama 亀山天皇
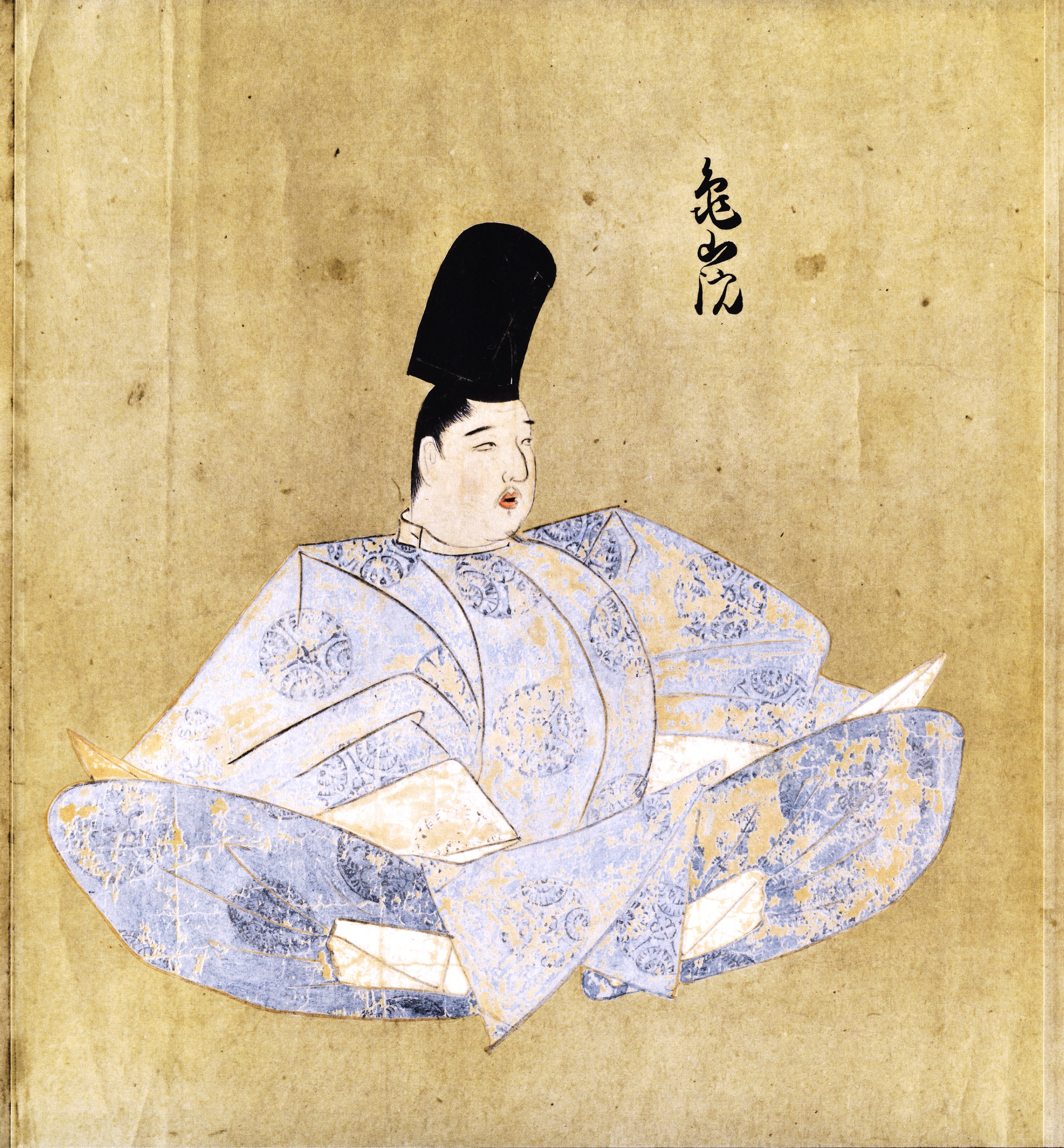
- Portrait from the Tenshi Sekkan Miei

Emperor of Japan
- Reign: 9 January 1260 – 6 March 1274
- Enthronement: 10 February 1260
- Predecessor: Go-Fukakusa
- Successor: Go-Uda
- Shōgun: Prince Munetaka; Prince Koreyasu
- Born: 9 July 1249
- Died: 4 October 1305 (aged 56); Mansion of Kameyama-dono (亀山殿邸), Heian Kyō
- Burial: Kameyama no Misasagi (亀山陵) (Kyoto)
- Spouse: Fujiwara no Saneko; Fujiwara no Kishi
- Issue among others...: Emperor Go-Uda
Posthumous name
- Tsuigō: Emperor Kameyama (亀山院 or 亀山天皇)
- House: Imperial House of Japan
- Father: Emperor Go-Saga
- Mother: Fujiwara no Kitsushi
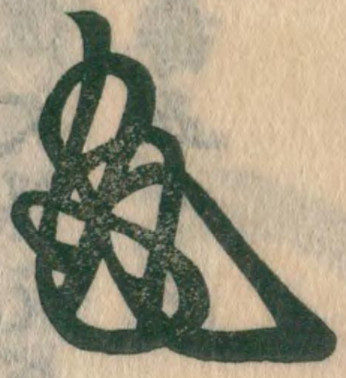
- Signature

Emperor Kameyama (亀山天皇, Kameyama-tennō; 9 July 1249 – 4 October 1305) was the 90th emperor of Japan, according to the traditional order of succession. His reign spanned the years from 1260 through 1274.

== Genealogy ==
Before his ascension to the Chrysanthemum Throne, his personal name (his imina) was Tsunehito-shinnō (恒仁親王).

He was the 7th son of Emperor Go-Saga

- Empress (Kōgō): Toin (Fujiwara Saneko) (洞院（藤原）佶子) later Kyogoku-in (京極院), Toin Saneo's daughter
  - First daughter: Imperial Princess Kenshi (睍子内親王; 1262–1264)
  - First son: Imperial Prince Tomohito (知仁親王; 1265–1267)
  - Second son: Imperial Prince Yohito (世仁親王) later Emperor Go-Uda
- Empress (Chūgū – a lower rank than Kōgō) Saionji (Fujiwara) Kishi (西園寺（藤原）嬉子) later Imadegawa-in (今出川院), Saionji Kinsuke's daughter
- Court Lady: Konoe (Fujiwara) Ishi (近衛（藤原）位子) later Shin-yōmeimon'in (新陽明門; 1262–1296)
  - Eighth son: Imperial Prince Hirohito (啓仁親王; 1276–1278)
  - Tenth son: Imperial Prince Tsuguhito (継仁親王; 1279–1280)
- Court Lady: Saionji (Fujiwara) Eiko later Shōkunmon'in (藤原（西園寺）瑛子; 昭訓門院; 1273–1336, Saionji Sanekane
  - Fourteenth Son: Imperial Prince Tokiwai-no-miya Tsuneakira (常盤井宮恒明親王; 1303–1351)
- Lady-in-waiting: Koga (Minamoto) Michiyoshi's daughter
  - Third Son: Imperial Prince Priest Shokaku (性覚法親王; 1267–1293)
- Lady-in-waiting: Sanjō Sanehira's daughter
  - Fourth son: Imperial Prince Priest Ryōjo (良助法親王; 1268–1318)
  - Sixth son: Imperial Prince Priest Shōun (聖雲法親王; 1271–1314)
  - Seventh son: Imperial Prince Priest Kakusei (覚雲法親王; 1272–1323)
  - Fifth daughter: married Kujō Moronori
- Lady-in-waiting: Fujiwara Saneto's daughter
  - Fifth Son: Imperial Prince Moriyoshi (守良親王)
- Lady-in-waiting: Fujiwara Masako (藤原雅子), Hosshōji Masahira's daughter
  - Second daughter: Imperial Princess Kenshi (憙子内親王) – Empress Dowager Shōkeimon'in (昭慶門院) married Emperor Go-Daigo
- Lady in waiting: Sochi-Naishi (帥典侍), Taira Tokinaka’s Daughter
  - Ninth son: Imperial Prince Priest Junjo (順助法親王; 1279–1322)
  - Eleventh son: Imperial Prince Priest Jidō (慈道法親王; 1282–1341)
  - Twentieth son: Imperial Prince Priest Gyōen (行円法親王)
- Court Lady: Toin (Fujiwara) Miwako (洞院 禖子), Toin Saneo's daughter
  - Third Daughter: Imperial Princess Rishi (理子内親王; 1274–1282)
- Court Lady: Nukigawa (貫川), Kyogoku temple's banished Priestess
  - Daughter: (d. 1329) married Konoe Iemoto
- Court Lady: Priest Genkoma's daughter
  - Son: Imperial Prince Kaneyoshi (兼良親王)
- Court Lady: Fujiwara Hisako (藤原寿子), Fujiwara Kagefusa's daughter
  - Son: Imperial Prince Sadayoshi (定良親王) later Imperial Prince Priest Eiun (叡雲法親王)
- Court Lady: Sanjo Kinchika’s daughter
  - son: Imperial Prince Priest Sho'e (性恵法親王)
- Court Lady: Ogura Kino’s daughter
  - son: Imperial Prince Priest In’un 恒雲法親王)

== Events of Kameyama's life ==
In 1258, he became Crown Prince at age 9.

Other names Emperor Kameyama had were:

- Kongogen (金剛源) – his name as a monk
- Zenrinji-dono (禅林寺殿) – Literally "Lord Zen-Temple" From the fact that he had a Zen temple in the north wing of his Imperial Villa
- Madenokō-ji-dono (from his residence)
- Bun'ō Kōtei (From the era name; Kōtei is another word for Emperor)

The name Kameyama comes from the location of his tomb.

- 9 January 1260 (Shōgen 1, 26th day of the 11th month): In the 14th year of Go-Fukakusa-tennō's reign (後深草天皇十四年), the emperor abdicated; and the succession (senso) was received by his younger brother. Shortly thereafter, Emperor Kameyama is said to have acceded to the throne (sokui).

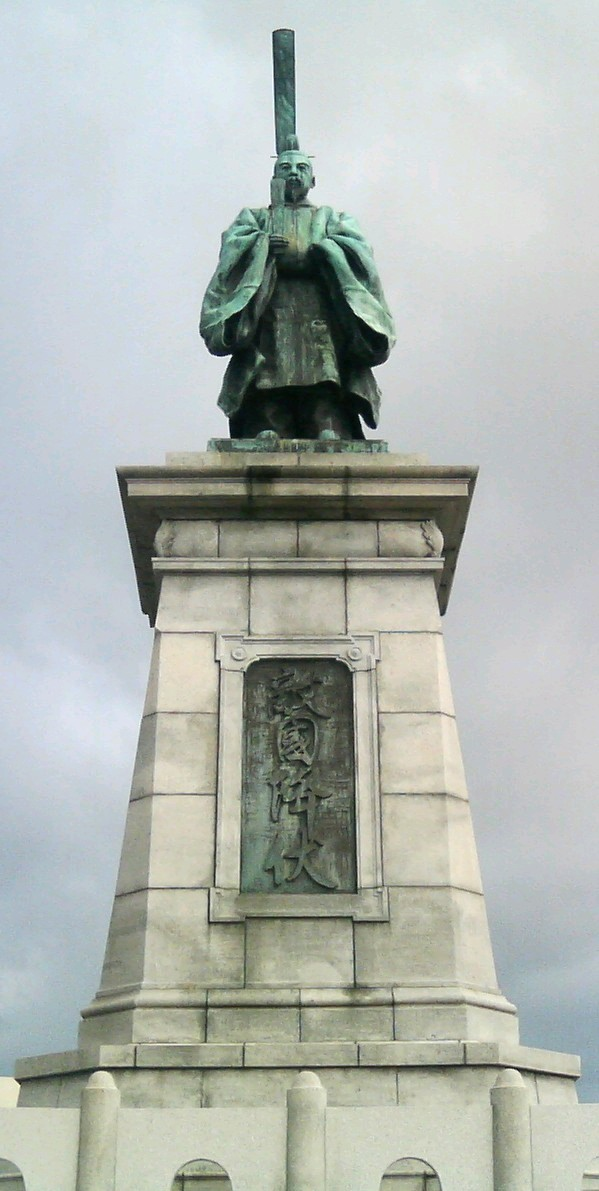
Statue of Emperor Kameyama located in Fukuoka, Japan.

In 1263, during the Kamakura Rebellion, the 6th shōgun, Imperial Prince Munetaka (eldest son of Emperor Go-Saga) was recalled from Kamakura to be replaced by his son Imperial Prince Koreyasu (age 2).

In 1265 a delegation sent by Kublai Khan, ruler of the Mongol Empire, arrived. On its way to Japan, they looted islands. The Mongols invited Japan to submit to the rule of Kublai. The Emperor and the Imperial Court suggested compromise, but they were ignored by the shogun in Kamakura. The Mongol delegation was sent back.

In 1274, abdicating to his son, Emperor Go-Uda, he began his reign as cloistered emperor.

During his time as cloistered emperor, the Mongols invaded the second time. Kameyama personally prayed at the Grand Shrine of Ise. On 15 August 1281, Kameyama-Jokō asked for Amaterasu intervention on behalf of Japan.

However, the Bakufu watched Kameyama with suspicion, and in 1287, encouraged Emperor Go-Uda to abdicate, and pushed for the enthronement of Emperor Go-Fukakusa's son, who became Emperor Fushimi. Kameyama's cloistered rule was suspended by this.

Later, Imperial Prince Hisa'aki, Emperor Go-Fukakusa's son, became shōgun strengthening the position of the Jimyōin-tō. This caused Kameyama to become despondent, and in 1289 he entered the priesthood, joining the Zen sect. Because of this, Zen Buddhism slowly penetrated into the Court Nobility.

In 1291, he helped establish the Buddhist temple Nanzen-ji in Kyōto.

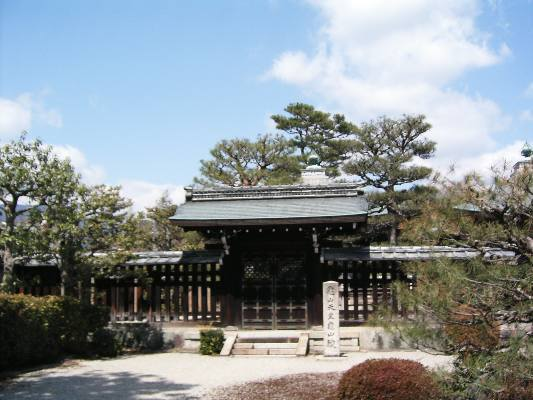
Memorial Shinto shrine in Tenryū-ji and mausoleum honoring Emperor Kameyama

In 1305, he died. Emperor Kameyama is enshrined at Kameyama no Misasagi at Tenryū-ji in Kyoto; and this Imperial mausoleum is maintained by the Imperial Household.

=== Kugyō ===
Kugyō (公卿) is a collective term for the very few most powerful men attached to the court of the Emperor of Japan in pre-Meiji eras. Even during those years in which the court's actual influence outside the palace walls was minimal, the hierarchic organization persisted.

In general, this elite group included only three to four men at a time. These were hereditary courtiers whose experience and background would have brought them to the pinnacle of a life's career. During Kameyama's reign, this apex of the Daijō-kan included:

- Kampaku (Regent for an adult Emperor):
  - Takatsukasa (Fujiwara) Kanehira (1255–1261)
  - Nijō (Fujiwara) Yoshizane (1261–1265)
  - Ichijō (Fujiwara) Sanetsune (1265–1267)
  - Konoe (Fujiwara) Motohira (1267–1268†)
  - Takatsukasa (Fujiwara) Mototada (1269–1273)
  - Kujō (Fujiwara) Tadaie (1273–1274, continues as sesshō for Emperor Go-Uda)
- Daijō-daijin (Chancellor):
  - Saionji (Fujiwara) Kinsuke (1262)
- Sadaijin (Minister of the Left):
  - Saionji (Fujiwara) Kinsuke (1259–1261)
  - Tōin "Yamashina" (Fujiwara) Saneo (1261–1263)
  - Ichijō (Fujiwara) Sanetsune (1263–1265)
  - Konoe (Fujiwara) Motohira (1265–1268)
  - Takatsukasa (Fujiwara) Mototada (1269)
  - Ichijō (Fujiwara) Ietsune (1269–1275)
- Udaijin (Minister of the Right):
  - Tōin "Yamashina" (Fujiwara) Saneo (1258–1261)
  - Konoe (Fujiwara) Motohira (1261–1265)
  - Takatsukasa (Fujiwara) Mototada (1265–1269)
  - Ichijō (Fujiwara) Ietsune (1269)
  - Kasannoin (Fujiwara) Michimasa (1269–1271)
  - Nijō (Fujiwara) Morotada (1271–1276)
- Naidaijin (Minister of the Center):
  - Konoe (Fujiwara) Motohira (1258–1261)
  - Sanjō (Fujiwara) Kinchika (1261–1262)
  - Takatsukasa (Fujiwara) Mototada (1262–1265)
  - Ooinomikado (Fujiwara) Fuyutada (1265–1267)
  - Ichijō (Fujiwara) Ietsune (1267–1269)
  - Kasannoin (Fujiwara) Michimasa (1269)
  - Nakanoin (Minamoto) Michinari (1269)
  - Nijō (Fujiwara) Morotada (1269–1271)
  - Kasannoin (Fujiwara) Morotsugu (1271–1275)

== Eras of Kameyama's reign ==
The years of Kameyama's reign are more specifically identified by more than one era name or nengō.

- Bun'ō (1260–1261)
- Kōchō (1261–1264)
- Bun'ei (1264–1275)

== See also ==
- Emperor of Japan
- List of Emperors of Japan
- Imperial cult
- Emperor Go-Kameyama

== Notes ==
Japanese Imperial kamon — a stylized chrysanthemum blossom

Regnal titles
Preceded by Emperor Go-Fukakusa	Emperor of Japan: Kameyama; 1260–1274	Succeeded by Emperor Go-Uda
