= Lady Nijō =

Japanese noblewoman, poet and author (1258 – after 1307)

- ごふかくさいんのにじょう 後深草院二条
- Born: 1258; Kamakura Japan
- Occupations: Imperial consort, Buddhist nun, writer
- Spouse: Emperor Go-Fukakusa
- Partner(s): Saionji Sanekane; Prince Shojo
- Children: 4
- Relatives: Koga Michiteru (paternal grandfather); Minamoto no Michichika (paternal great-grandfather)
- Writing career
- Language: Late Middle Japanese
- Years active: early 14th century CE
- Period: Kamakura period
- Genre: Diary
- Notable work: Towazugatari

Lady Nijō (後深草院二条, Go-Fukakusain no Nijō) (1258 – after 1307) was a Japanese noblewoman, poet and author. She was a concubine of Emperor Go-Fukakusa from 1271 to 1283, and later became a Buddhist nun. After years of travelling, around 1304–07 she wrote a memoir, Towazugatari ("An Unasked-For Tale", commonly translated into English as The Confessions of Lady Nijō), the work for which she is known today, and which is also the only substantial source of information on her life.

== Court life ==
Lady Nijō was a member of the Koga family, a branch of the Minamoto clan descended from Emperor Murakami through Prince Tomohira, his seventh son. The clan's station at court was established through the allegiance made by Tomohira's son, Minamoto no Morofusa, with Emperor Go-Sanjō. Lady Nijō's father and paternal grandfather held important positions at the imperial court, and many of her relatives and ancestors had high reputations for their literary abilities. Her real name does not survive. The name "Nijō" was given to her at the court: it was common practice at the time to designate court ladies by street names, and "Nijō" ("Second Avenue") designates a high rank. It indicates proximity to the First Ward, which is where the Imperial household was located.

According to the Towazugatari, Emperor Go-Fukakusa was in love with Nijō's mother, Kinshi, the daughter of Shijô Takachika and a naishi no suke (典侍, assistant handmaid), who would have been the fourteen-year-old emperor's initiation to sex. However, Kinshi died shortly after Nijō was born, and Go-Fukakusa turned his affections to Nijō. She was taken to the court at the age of four, and was subsequently raised there; the death of her mother and the lack of a maternal home, where aristocratic children were normally raised, away from the court, rendered her effectively homeless. In 1271, Nijō, aged 14, was given by her father to Go-Fukakusa as a concubine. It is unclear whether Nijō should be considered a formal wife (seisai) or a concubine (meshudo): there is evidence in the Confessions to support both interpretations. In the Towazugatari she describes being raped by Go-Fukakusa at age 14. However, she gained a certain amount of influence and protection when she was adopted by Lady Kitayama, the wife of the powerful Saionji Saneuji, the most politically powerful man of his day.

Nijō's life at the court was plagued by numerous troubles. Her father died when she was 15 and it hampered her circumstance because there was no influential figure to advance her cause. Additionally, she was forced to have sexual relations against her will with court men, including Takatsukasa Kanehira. Her relationship with the emperor also became strained from the beginning, because she took several other lovers over the years, including one whom she knew before becoming a concubine. Matters were complicated further by Nijō's pregnancies: the only child she bore to Go-Fukakusa died in infancy, and the other three children she had were not by the emperor. Go-Fukakusa's consort, Higashi-nijō, was greatly displeased with Nijō's behaviour and Go-Fukakusa's apparent affinity for the concubine. Ultimately, it was due to Higashi-nijō's request that Nijō was expelled from the court in 1283.

== Religious life ==
Nijō's life after leaving the imperial court are revealed in Books 4 and 5 of Towazugatari. Like many women in medieval Japan whose lives met with unfortunate circumstances, Nijō became a Buddhist nun. She traveled to sacred and historical places, following the footsteps of the famous poet and priest, Saigyō, returning to the capital regularly. Kimura Saeko notes that some of these visits never actually took place, meaning that sections of Nijō's travels are fictionalised. Book 4 begins in 1289, skipping several years (thus leading scholars to believe that some material may be missing); Book 5 skips some more years and describes Nijō's grief at Go-Fukakusa's death in 1304. Towazugatari ends in 1306, and nothing is known about what happened to Nijō afterward or when she died.

== Towazugatari ==
Towazugatari was written c. 1307 and covers events of the period from 1271 to 1306. The work is considered one of the greatest works of Japanese literature, as well being a rare account of events not typically recorded in premodern Japanese literary works, such as sexual coercion.

Nijō's autobiography did not enjoy wide circulation, potentially due to later factionalism that split the imperial family or the fact that Nijō's portrayal of Emperor Go-Fukakusa was both intimate and humanising. A single 17th-century copy was discovered in Tokyo among the holdings of the Imperial Household in 1940 (in 1938 by other accounts) by Yamagishi Tokuhei, with several gaps in Book 5, noted by the scribe. The book was published in 1950, with a complete annotated edition following in 1966. There are three English translations:

- Karen Brazell. The Confessions of Lady Nijo. A Zenith book, published by Arrow Books Ltd., London, 1973. ISBN 0-600-20813-3
- Wilfrid Whitehouse and Eizo Yanagisawa. Lady Nijo's own story; Towazugatari: the candid diary of a thirteenth-century Japanese imperial concubine. Tuttle, Rutland, Vt. 1974. ISBN 0-8048-1117-2
- Meredith McKinney. A Tale Unasked. Penguin Classics, London, 2025. ISBN 978-0-241-56246-8

== Genealogy ==
=== Ancestors ===
Ancestors of Lady Nijō

8. Minamoto no Michichika; 源 通親
4. Koga Michiteru; 久我 通光
9. Fujiwara no Hanshi; 藤原 範子
2. Minamoto no Masatada; 源 雅忠
10. Fujiwara no Norimitsu; 藤原 範光
5. Kousuke; 督 典侍
11.
1. Lady Nijō; 後深草院二条
12. Shijo no Tachihira; 四条隆衡
6. Shijo no Takachika; 四条 隆親
13.
3. Dainagon Tenji Chikako; 大納言 典侍 近子
14.
7.
15.

=== Issue ===
Partners and their respective issue:

1. Emperor Go-Fukakusa (後深草天皇; 28 June 1243 – 17 August 1304)
  1. First son (1273 – 1274)
2. Saionji Sanekane (西園寺 実兼; 1249 – 21 October 1322)
  1. First daughter (1275 – ?)
3. Prince Shojo (d. 1281)
  1. Second son (1281 – ?)
  2. Third son (1282 – ?)

== In contemporary culture ==
Lady Nijō appears as an important character in Act I of Caryl Churchill's play Top Girls.
