= Mototada =

- Gender: Male

Origin
- Origin: Japanese
- Meaning: Different meanings depending on the kanji used

Mototada (written: 元忠 or 基忠) is a masculine Japanese given name. Notable people with the name include:

- Takatsukasa Mototada (鷹司 基忠; 1247–1313), Japanese kugyō
- Torii Mototada (鳥居 元忠; 1539–1600), Japanese samurai
