= Kanehira =

Kanehira is both a masculine Japanese given name and a surname. Notable people with the name include:

- Ryōzō Kanehira (金平 亮三; 1882–1948), Japanese botanist
- Imai Kanehira (1152–1184), Japanese military commander
- Takatsukasa Kanehira (鷹司 兼平; 1228–1294), Japanese kugyō
- Kanehira Yamamoto (兼平 山本; born 1977), Japanese voice actor
