= Kasuga Gongen Genki E =

Kasuga Gongen Genki E (春日権現験記絵) is a set of painted handscrolls (emakimono) that was produced in the early 14th century, during the Kamakura period of Japan, by members of the Fujiwara clan. The work was created in order to honor the deities of Kasuga, with the stories revolving around the Kasuga shrine and Kōfukuji temple, located in Nara. The colourful silk work was made with silver and gold paints and consists of 20 scrolls with 93 sections of text and illustrations, which was completed in 1309.

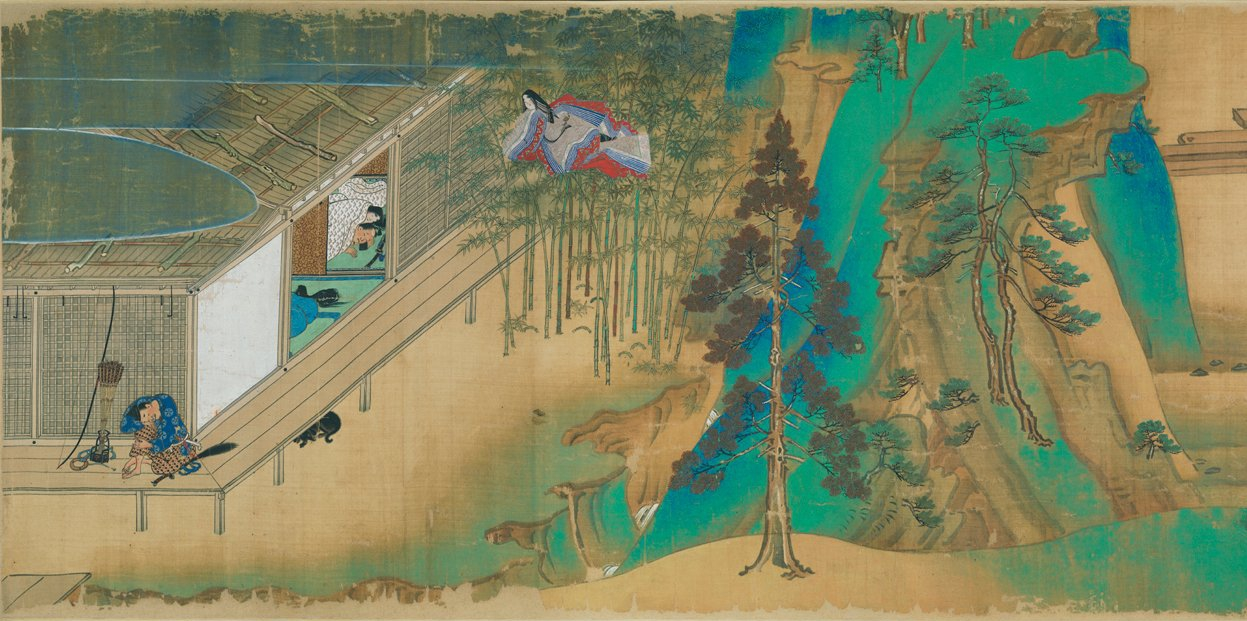
Kasuga Gongen Genki E

== Meaning of the name ==
The term “Gongen” means avatar or deity, while the term “genki” in the title is actually short for “reigenki”; reigenki can be translated into “chronicles of marvelous and supernatural events”. Taken together, the title has been translated into “The Miracles of the Kasuga Deity” or “Illustrated Tales of the Miracles of the Avatars of Kasuga” or the equivalent.

== Content and themes ==
The narrative is grounded in the honji suijaku doctrine, whereby the four Shinto kami enshrined at Kasuga Taisha are understood as local manifestations of Buddhist deities, which accounts for the Buddhist iconographic content found throughout an otherwise Shinto-centred work. Its fifty-eight tales open with an oracle delivered by the Kasuga deity in 937, in which it identifies itself as Jihi Mangyō Bosatsu ("the compassionate bodhisattva of myriad deeds"), and close with a sermon explaining that the shrine's main hall is itself the Buddhist Pure Land. A recurring figure across the tales is Hime no kami, depicted as a richly dressed court princess. Thematically the work sits close to the setsuwa (Buddhist anecdote) and engi (temple/shrine founding legend) genres, while remaining steeped in classical waka poetry, in which Kasuga Taisha figures as a traditional utamakura.

== Authorship and history ==
The former regent (kanpaku), Takatsukasa (Fujiwara) Mototada, and his three sons wrote the original text, based on stories compiled by a monk named Kakuen of Tōbokuin, in consultation with two other senior monks of Kōfuku-ji (Jishin of Daijōin and Hanken of Sanzōin).

Mototada copied out scrolls 1-5, 9-13 and 16; the eldest son, Fuyuhira, copied out scrolls 6-8; the second son, Fuyumoto, copied out scrolls 14, 15, 18 and 19; and the fourth son, Ryōshin, copied out scrolls 17 and 18. Takashina Takekane, who was the director of the imperial painting bureau (edokoro), created the illustrations. Following the completion of the work, the Minister of the Left (Sadaijin), Saionji Kinhira (who was also a brother to Kakuen), dedicated it to the Kasuga Shrine and neighboring Buddhist temple, Kōfukuji, in order to honor the deities and thank them for honoring his home.

When the scrolls were first completed and kept at the Kasuga shrine, the scrolls were carefully protected—with no shrine priest or Kōfukuji monk less than 40 years of age able to view the scrolls. Moreover, if the scrolls were required at Kōfukuji, it was only the Tōbokuin sanctuary that was permitted to receive the scrolls. However, for a while, during the late 18th Century, the scrolls became less carefully looked after. The scrolls were most likely treated more casually because of the decline suffered by Kasuga and Kōfukuji at the time.

In order to make Kasuga Gongen genki e more accessible to the public, copies of the work began to appear during the Edo period. However, permission from the head of the Fujiwara clan was needed before any copies were allowed. Currently there are 6 known copies to be made: one owned by the Kajūji family, the Yōmei Bunko copy (Yōmei Bunko-bon), the Kasuga copy (Kasuga-bon/Kuwana-bon), the Tokyo National Museum copy (Tōkyō Kokuritsu Hakubutsukan-bon) no. 1, the National Diet Library copy (Kokuritsu Kokkai Toshokan-bon), and the Tokyo National Museum copy no. 2 (3). The original work is of extremely high quality and is kept by the Imperial household.

== English translation ==
Royall Tyler has completed a study and complete English translation of Kasuga Gongen genki e, under the title “The Miracles of the Kasuga Deity”, which was published in 1990. Within his translation, Royall Tyler refers to Kasuga Gongen genki as “the Genki”. The first part of the book gives background information on the Kasuga shrine, Kōfukuji, the Kasuga cult and the religious background and context in which the original work was created. The second part of the book gives a complete translation of all 20 scrolls, with annotations to assist the reader in understanding the work.

== See also ==
- Japanese painting
- List of National Treasures of Japan (paintings)

== Gallery ==
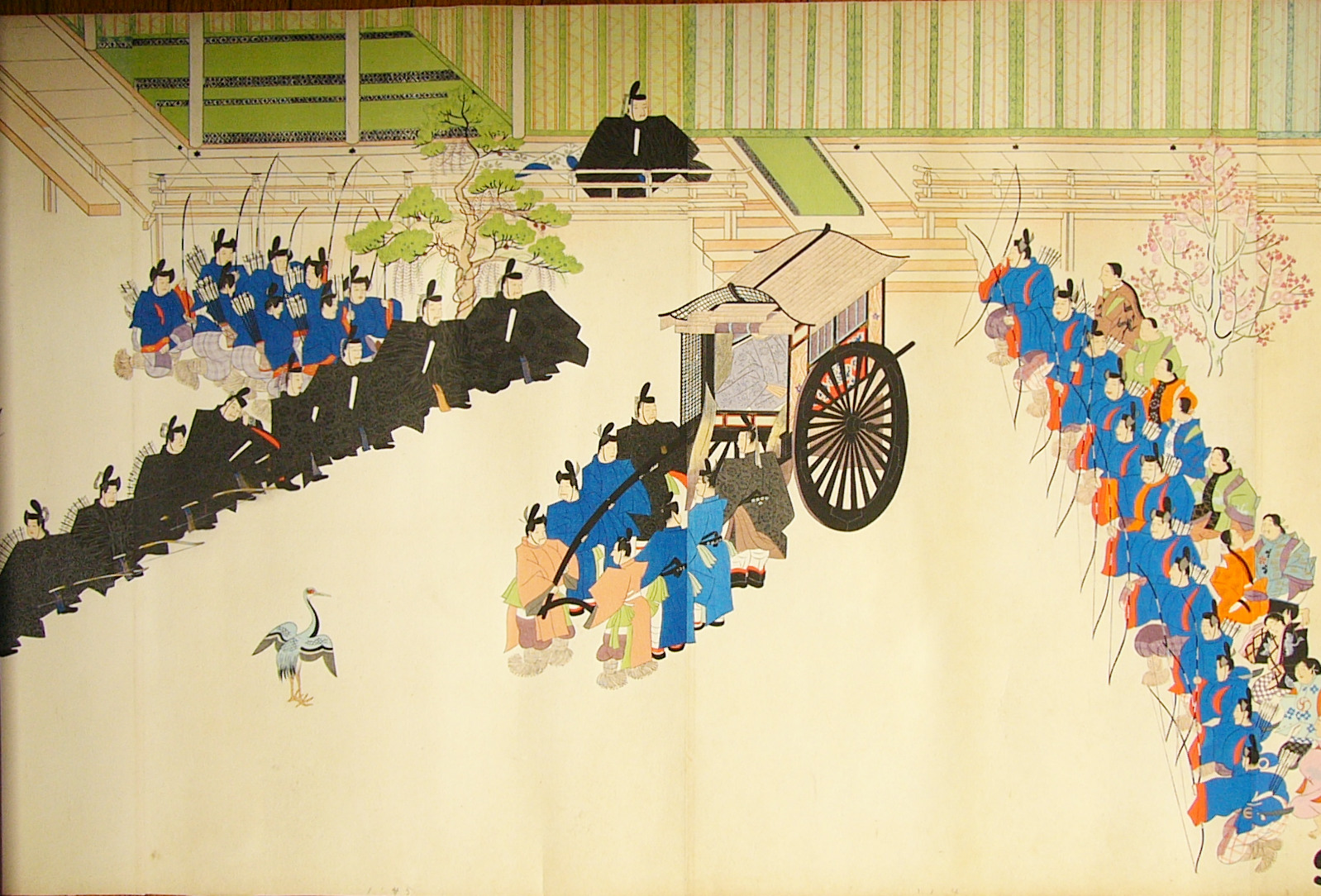

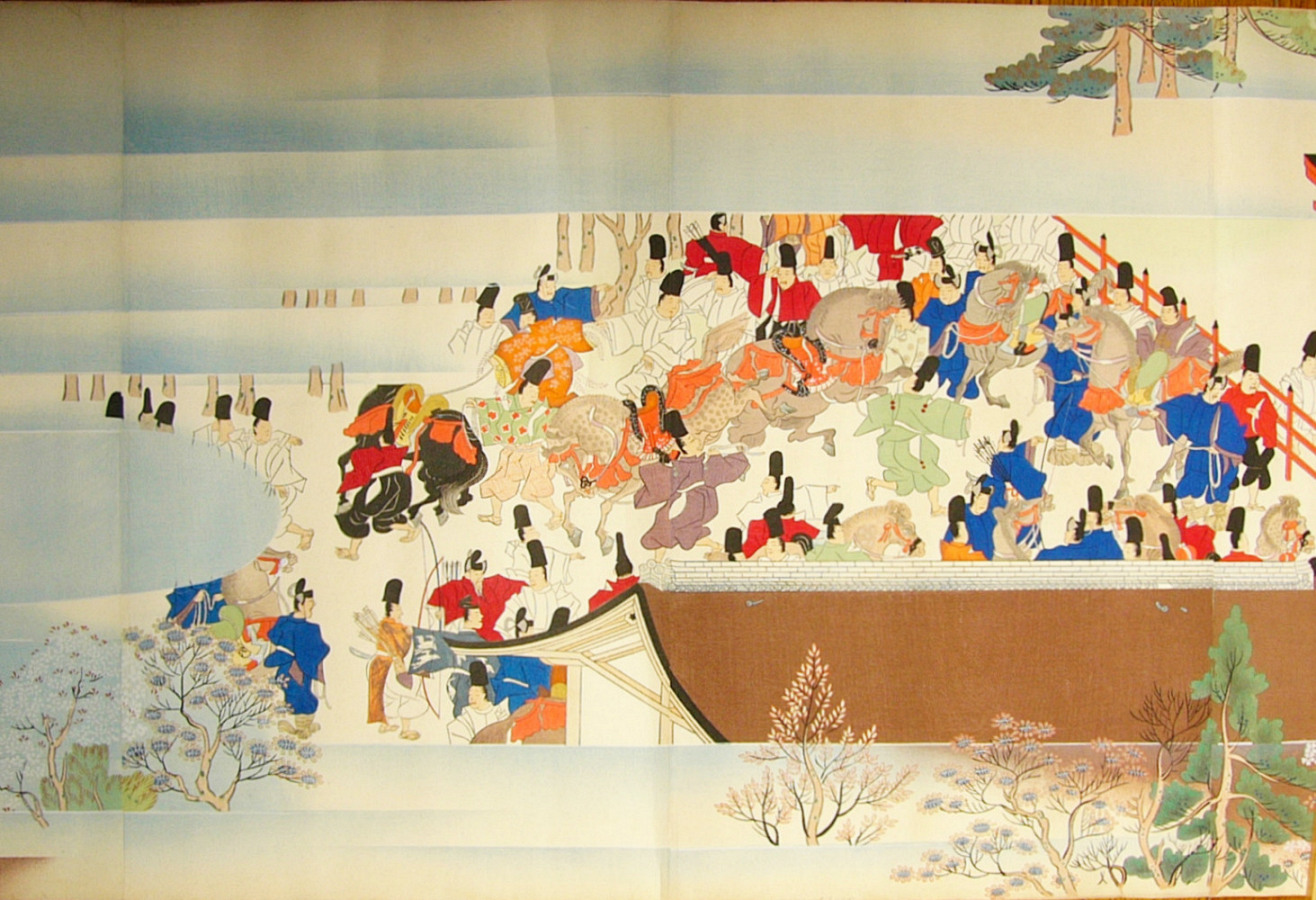

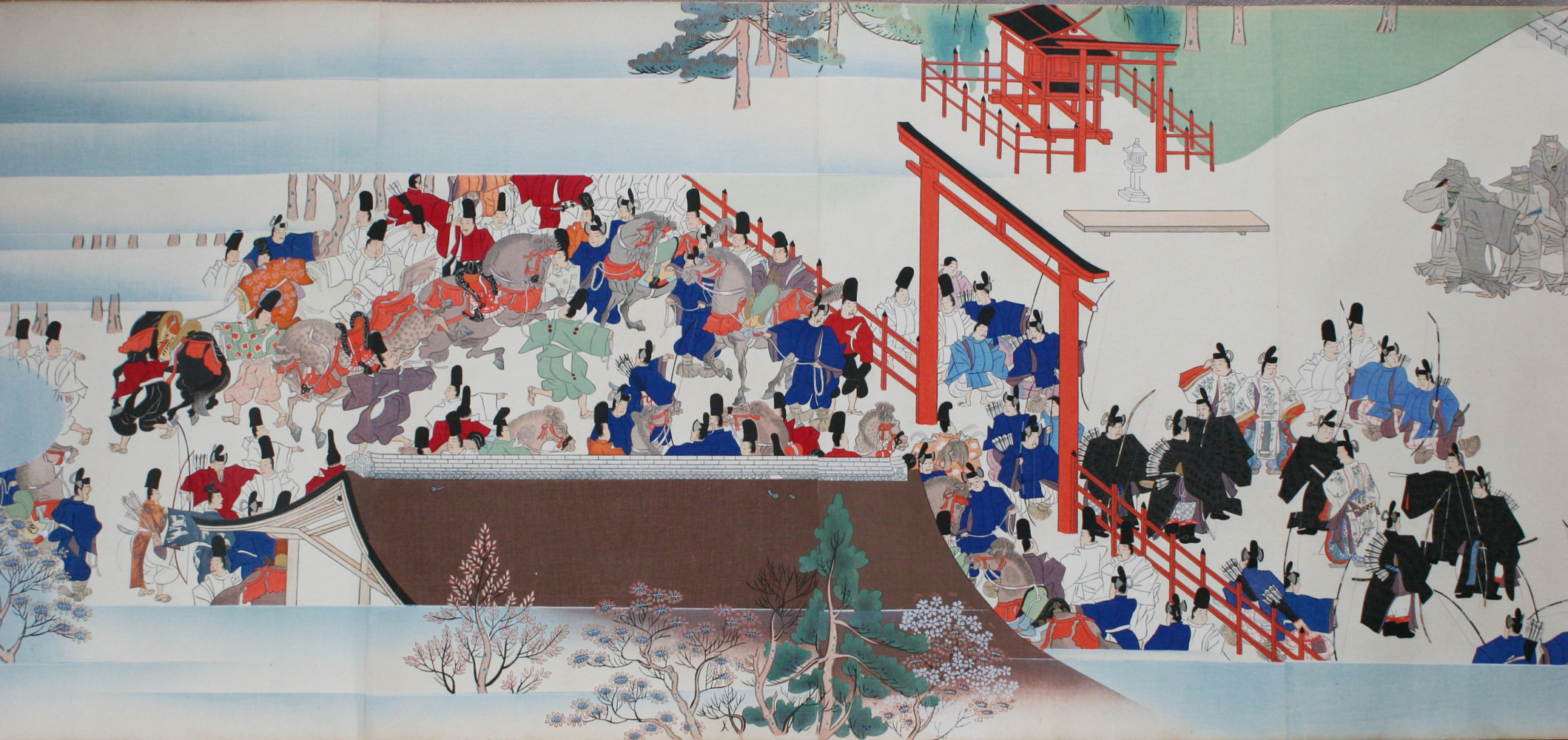

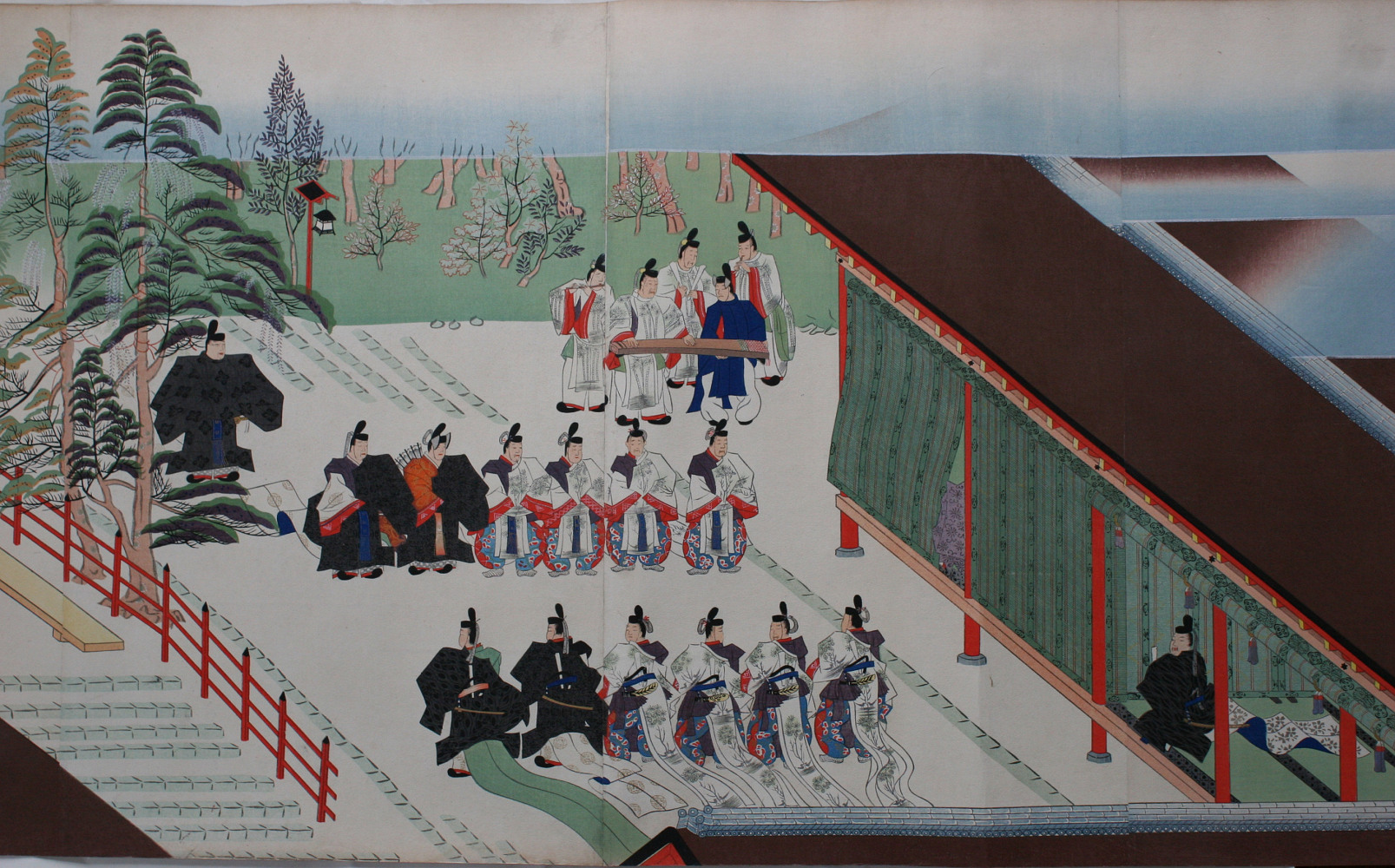

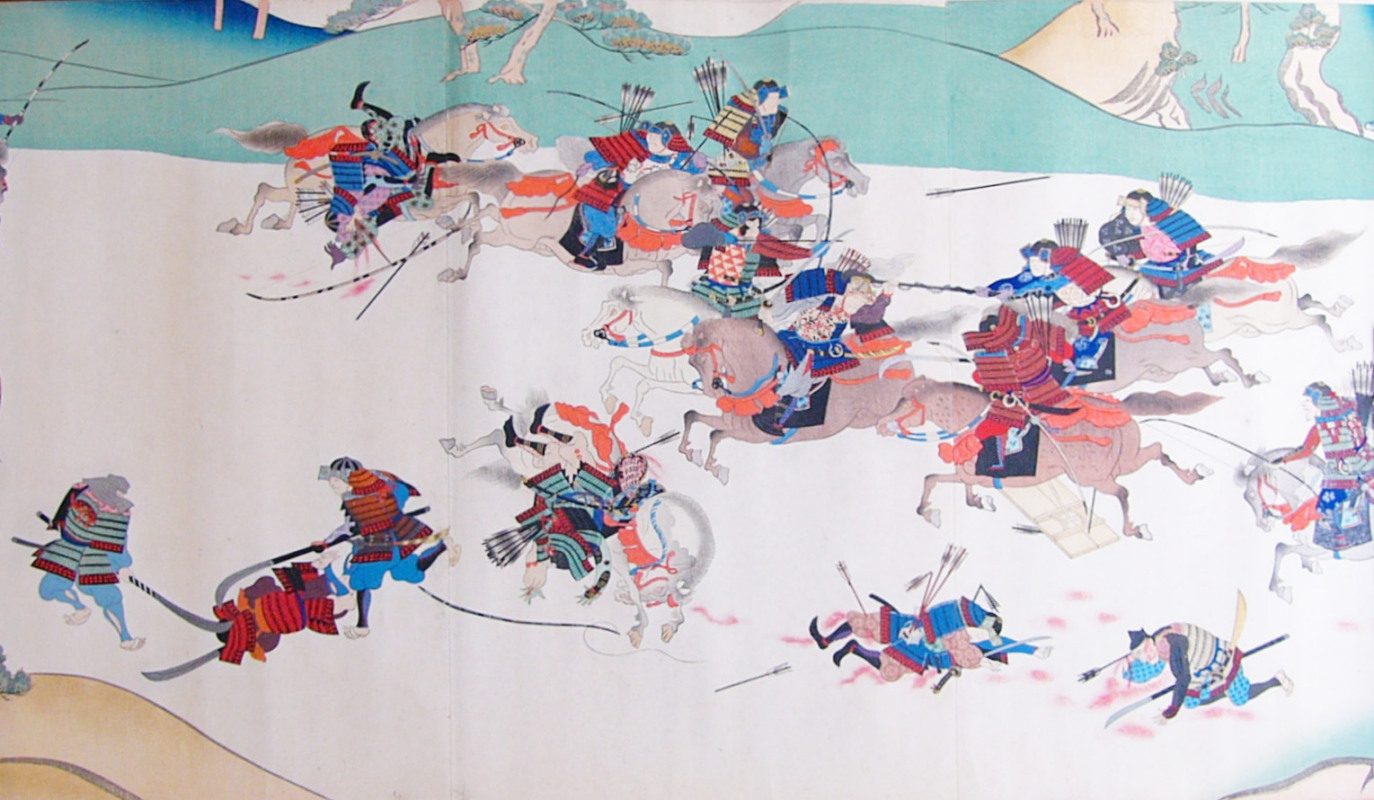

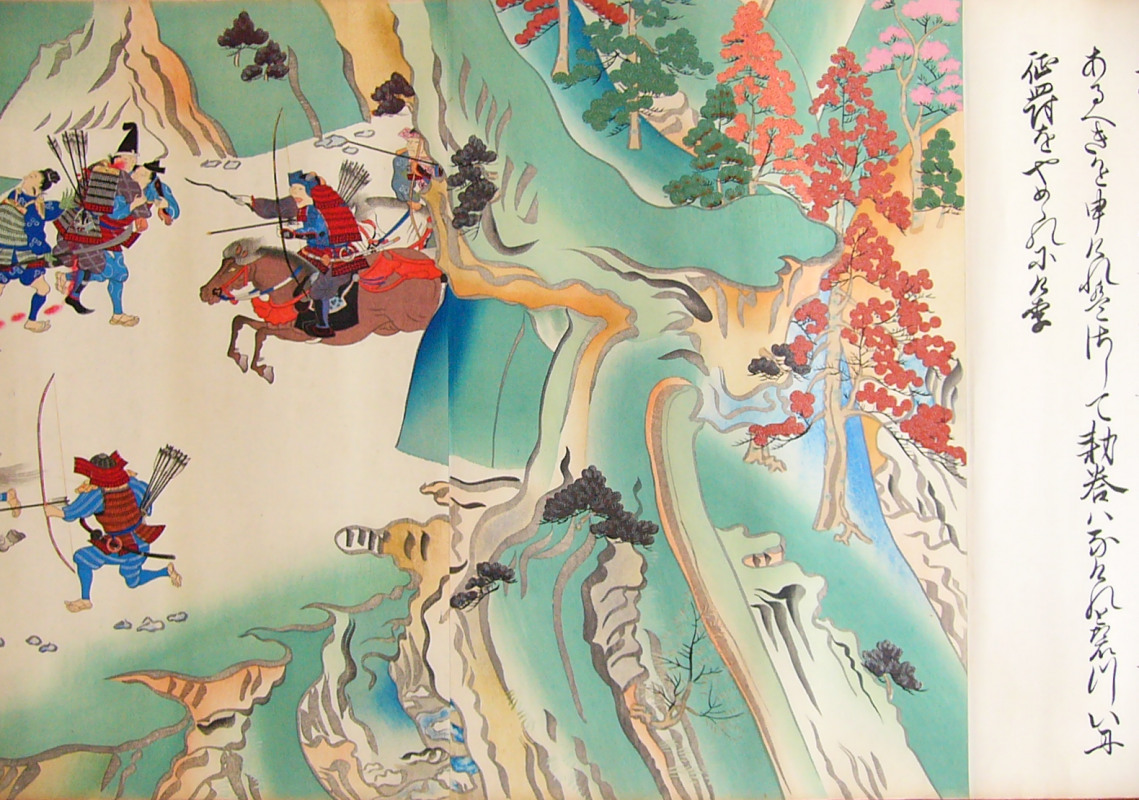
