= Konoe Iemoto =

Konoe Iemoto (近衛 家基; 1261–1296), son of Motohira, was a kugyō or Japanese court noble of the Kamakura period (1185–1333). He held a regent position kampaku from 1289 and 1291 and from 1293 to 1296. He had sons Tsunehira with a daughter of Emperor Kameyama and Iehira with a daughter of regent Takatsukasa Kanehira.
