= Minamoto no Michichika =

Japanese noble (1149–1202)

Junior First Rank Minamoto no Michichika 源通親
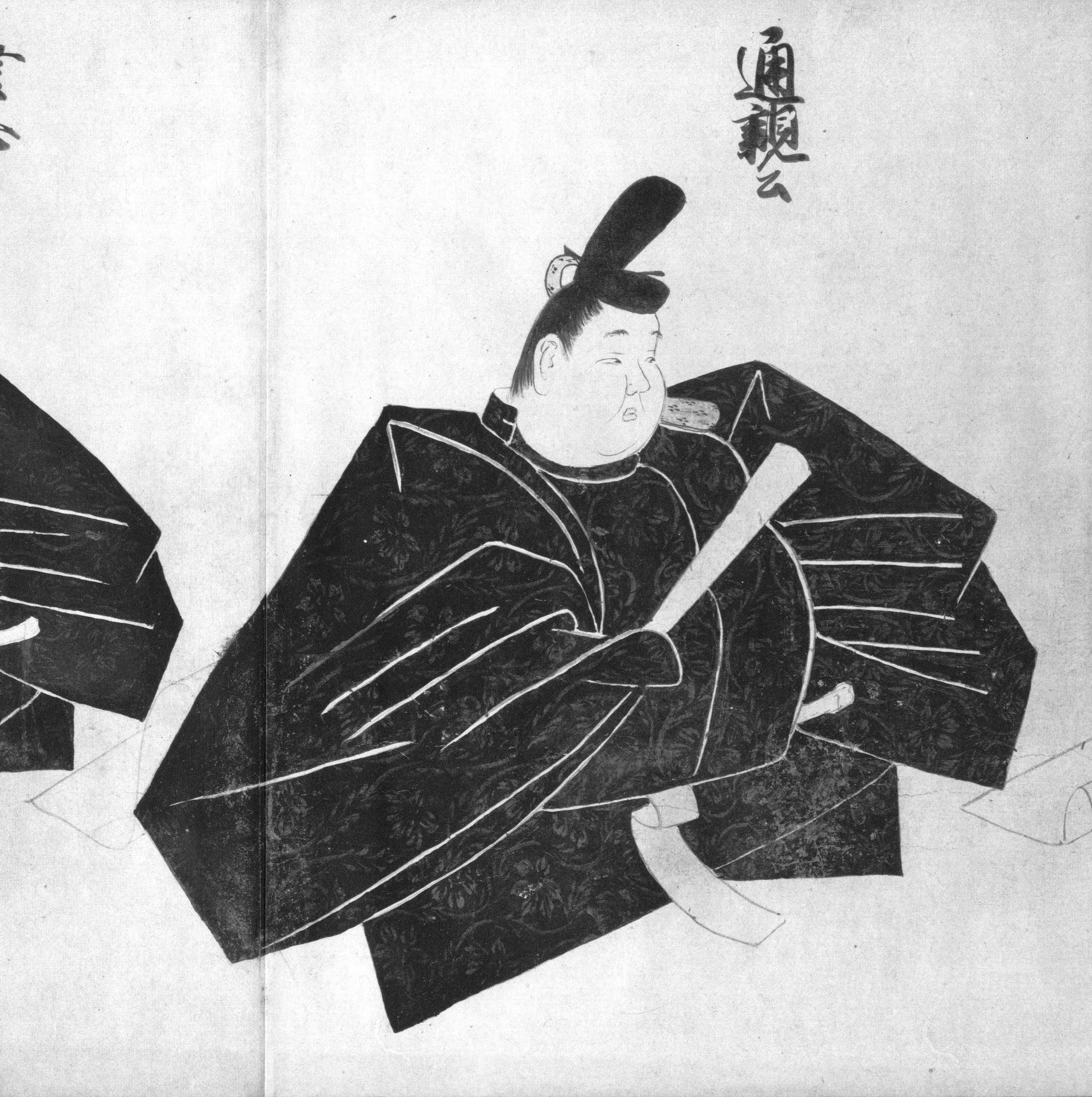
- Portrait from the Tenshi Sekkan Miei (天子摂関御影), held by the Museum of the Imperial Collections
- Born: 1149
- Died: November 7, 1202 (aged 52–53)
- Family: Murakami Genji
- Father: Minamoto no Masamichi

Minamoto no Michichika (源 通親; 1149 – November 7, 1202) was a Japanese noble and statesman of the late Heian period and early Kamakura period. Serving in the courts of seven different emperors, he brought the Murakami Genji to the peak of their success. He is also commonly known as Tsuchimikado Michichika (土御門 通親), and in Sōtō Zen buddhism as Koga no Michichika (久我 通親).

== Life ==
=== Aide to Emperor Takakura ===
Born the heir of the Murakami Genji branch of the Minamoto clan in 1149, and in 1158 was granted the lower junior fifth rank (従五位下), via the Minamoto family head's prerogative to thus promote one individual each year. The Murakami Genji had previously enjoyed prosperity as the maternal relatives of Emperor Horikawa, but after this were pushed back by descendants of Fujiwara no Kinsue's branch of the Fujiwara clan, the Kan'in-ryū (閑院流). Michichika's father Masamichi served Bitokumon-in during Emperor Toba's cloistered rule, but changed his role under the cloistered rule of Emperor Go-Shirakawa. In 1168, when Go-Shirakawa's wife Taira no Shigeko became kōtaigō, Masamichi became director of the Kōtaigō's Quarters (皇太后宮大夫). Michichika was permitted entry into the court along with Emperor Takakura's ascension in the same year, serving as a close aid to the young emperor. Michichika's first wife was a daughter of the daijō-daijin Fujiwara no Tadamasa, but he soon took a daughter of Taira no Norimori or Michimori as his second wife, strengthening his ties with that powerful clan.

In 1179, Michichika became head of the Kurōdo-dokoro, and in 1180 he was promoted both to sangi, thus joining the ranks of the kugyō, and to provisional lieutenant general of the imperial guard (左近衛権中将). After Taira no Kiyomori's coup d'etat in late 1179, Emperor Takakura reluctantly abdicated the throne to begin his own cloistered rule, and Michichika supported his inexperienced efforts as head of his cloistered government. Michichika joined the imperial outing to Itsukushima and relocation of the capital to Fukuhara-kyō in the first half of the year, but as the country fell into upheaval after the first battle of Uji, he returned to Heian-kyō in the autumn. The retired emperor Takakura's physical condition worsened and he fell ill. Michichika composed a poem praying for his recovery, but in 1181, Takakura died at 21 years old. As a close attendant of the dead sovereign, Michichika was bestowed an undyed white mourning dress. Lamenting the death of his longtime master, he recorded his plaintive feelings in the Takakura-in Shōkaki (高倉院昇霞記).

=== Genpei War ===
Shortly thereafter Taira no Kiyomori died and Go-Shirakawa reopened his cloistered rule, and the center of power continued to change at a dizzying pace. Meanwhile, Michichika avoided relying on the patronage of any particular power, but participated passionately in debates at Go-Shirakawa's palace and worked diligently at the business of government, increasing his presence in the court. When the Taira clan fled the capital in 1183, he went visited Go-Shirakawa in order to bid them farewell. When Emperor Go-Toba took the throne in the next month, the Imperial Regalia were in the possession of the Taira. Michichika raised the examples of Emperor Guangwu of Han and Emperor Yuan of Jin, who obtained their imperial seals only after assuming the throne, in order to help Go-Toba ascend smoothly. He was present at Hōjūjidono during the Siege of Hōjūjidono that autumn.

Michichika's loyalty was recognized, and in spring of 1185 he was promoted to provisional chūnagon, and that winter was appointed as one of ten ministers appointed to oversee the court, called gisō (議奏). He was granted Inaba Province as a fief and recommended his second son Horikawa Michitomo as its governor. He married Emperor Go-Toba's wetnurse, Fujiwara no Hanshi, and adopted her daughter Minamoto no Zaishi. As Michichika headed the event teams for Kujō Kanezane's proclamations as nairan and head of the sekkan Fujiwara clan, and Kanezane praised Michichika's hard work in turn, the relationship between the two appears to have been healthy at the time. Under Kanezane's conservative administration, though, Michichika's promotion stalled. In 1188, Michichika protested against the promotion of Kanezane's younger and less experienced son Kujō Yoshitsune over him to the senior second rank (正二位), requesting that he too be promoted. Kanezane criticized Michichika harshly, calling him ungrateful for his promotion to junior second rank (従二位) the previous year, and in this no different from a bird or animal. After this, their relationship soured, and Michichika began to look for an opportunity to take Kanezane down.

=== Guardian to Senyōmon-in ===
In late 1189, Michichika invited Go-Shirakawa to the Koga estate and presented him with various gifts. A month and a half later, Go-Shirakawa's youngest daughter Princess Kinshi was proclaimed an imperial princess, and Michichika was appointed as her guardian, strengthening his relationship with her birth mother Takashina no Eishi. In 1191, Princess Kinshi was bestowed the Buddhist name of Senyōmon-in (宣陽門院), and Michichika became the steward of her household, appointing his sons Michitomo and Michimune to positions within it. When Go-Shirakawa died in 1192, it was Senyōmon-in who inherited his largest territory Chōkōdō-ryō (長講堂領), and as Michichika was its effective manager, he brought the courtiers in control of it into his jurisdiction, forming a strong political foothold for himself.

When Minamoto no Yoritomo entered the capital in 1190, Michichika remembered to curry favor with him by acting as event manager for his appointment to general of the imperial guard (右近衛大将), but also planned to strengthen his relationship with Yoritomo's confidant Ōe no Hiromoto. In 1191, he broke with tradition by appointing Hiromoto as a professor (明法博士) in the Daigaku-ryō and captain in the imperial guard (左衛門大尉).

After Go-Shirakawa's death, Kujō Kanezane controlled the court through the young Emperor Go-Toba, but his strict adherence to tradition and stress on lineage in personnel affairs fostered opposition amongst the middle and lower ranking nobles, and he gradually lost popularity in the court. Michichika won over the noble families of Fujiwara no Akisue and the Kashūji-ryū (勧修寺流) branch of the Fujiwara, who Kanezane had treated coldly, as allies. Meanwhile, he used Takashina no Eishi as an intermediary to alienate Yoritomo, who wanted to marry his daughter Ō-hime to the Emperor, from Kanezane, who had already married his own daughter Kujō Ninshi to said emperor. In 1195, Michichika was promoted to dainagon, and when his adopted daughter Zaishi bore the Emperor a prince, the future Emperor Tsuchimikado, his position in the court suddenly solidified. In 1196, he made Kujō Ninshi leave the palace and overthrew Kanezane, replacing him with Konoe Motomichi in a coup d'etat.

=== Minamoto Hakuriku ===
In 1198, Michichika forced the enthronement of Emperor Tsuchimikado against both precedent and the opposition of the shogunate. Though Michichika tried to use the case of Emperor Kōnin as a precedent for the sudden enthronement, Fujiwara no Teika scathingly commented "If Tsuchimikado is Kōnin, then who is Dōkyō?" After this, Michichika reached the height of his power as the Emperor's maternal grandfather, and was called Minamoto Hakuriku (源博陸). The term "Hakuriku" here refers to the position of kampaku, although Michichika himself never officially held the title.

In 1199, Michichika became a general of the imperial guard (右近衛大将). He tried to lessen the shogunate's opposition by appointing the heir Minamoto Yoriie as lieutenant general of the imperial guard (左近衛中将), but shortly thereafter received news that Yoritomo had fallen seriously ill. Once Yoritomo's death was publicly announced, it would become necessary to delay Yoriie's promotion, and so Michichika hurriedly conducted both appointments in a simplified fashion. Teika once again criticized Michichika for enforcing the appointment while knowing of Yoritomo's demise and then expressing his condolences and making a show of mourning the next day, calling this an "egregious plot". Yoritomo's death upset the political situation, and in the capital Ichijō Yoshiyasu plotted an attack on Michichika, forcing him to hide in the retired emperor's palace. Executives of the shogunate, with Ōe no Hiromoto at the center, supported Michichika, suppressing the movement to remove him and restoring peace to the capital.

Michichika made various preparations, rebuilding Tsuchimikado's palace and adding a gate, and that summer was promoted to naidaijin. While respecting the viewpoint of the now-mature retired emperor Go-Toba, Michichika placed Kujō Yoshitsune as sadaijin and Konoe Iezane as udaijin to preserve peace between and with both families. Since both were still young, Michichika was effectively in control of the Daijō-kan. Around this time, he also married Fujiwara no Motofusa's daughter Ishi.

In 1200 Go-Toba's third son Prince Morinari, the future Emperor Juntoku, became crown prince. Michichika became his tutor (東宮傅), while his brother-in-law Fujiwara Terumitsu (藤原範光) became vice-steward of the Crown Prince's Quarters (春宮亮), and his heir Minamoto Michiteru (源通光) provisionally assumed the same title, filling the Crown Prince's Quarters with the Murakami Genji and his Fujiwara relatives. Even 1202 he appeared vigorous, acting as event manager when his adopted daughter Zaishi received the Buddhist name Shōmeimon-in (承明門院), and welcoming Go-Toba to a palace built by his sworn friend Fujiwara no Muneyori, but he suddenly died that autumn at age 54. When Konoe Iezane heard of his death, he recorded in his diary that Michichika had handled all the business of government, and the court granted him the posthumous junior first rank (従一位). Go-Toba was also said to have expressed his sorrow by stopping holding poetry contests. After Michichika's death, there was nobody left who could dissuade Go-Toba, and he began his cloistered rule in earnest.

Michichika was also a skilled poet and also served in the waka-dokoro (和歌所), where he led the planning for a new poetry collection that would later become the Shin Kokin Wakashū. However, he died without seeing its completion. That collection, along with many others, includes some of Michichika's waka.

== Famous works ==
Takakura-in Itsukushima Gokōki (高倉院厳島御幸記), written in 1180, is Michichika's travel diary from retired Emperor Takakura's Imperial visit to Itsukushima in Aki Province. Takakura-in Shōkaki (高倉院昇霞記), written in 1181, records the state of affairs at the time of Emperor Takakura's death and mourns him. Both are written in a mix of kana and kanji, as is modern Japanese. The two together are known as "Minamoto no Michichika's Diaries" (源通親日記).

== Genealogy ==
- Father: Minamoto no Masamichi (源雅通)
- Mother: daughter of Fujiwara no Yukikane (藤原行兼), court lady of Bifukumon-in
- Wife: daughter of Fujiwara no Tadamasa (藤原忠雅)
  - Eldest son: Minamoto no Michimune (源通宗; 1168–1198)
- Wife: daughter of Taira no Norimori (平教盛) or Taira no Michimori (平通盛), court lady of Emperor Takakura
  - Second son: Horikawa Michitomo (堀川通具; 1171–1227), descendants became Horikawa clan (died out in Muromachi period)
- Wife: Fujiwara no Hanshi (藤原範子), junior third rank (従三位), daughter of Fujiwara no Norikane (藤原範兼)
  - Third son: Koga Michiteru (久我通光; 1187–1248), descendants carried on Koga clan
  - Fourth son: Tsuchimikado Sadamichi (土御門定通; 1188–1247), descendants became Tsuchimikado clan (died out in Muromachi period)
  - Fifth son: Nakanoin Michikata (中院通方; 1189–1239), descendants became Nakanoin clan
  - Adopted daughter: Minamoto no Zaishi (源在子; 1171–1257), a.k.a. Shōmeimon-in (承明門院), biological daughter of Nōen (能円), wife of Emperor Go-Toba and birth mother of Emperor Tsuchimikado
- Wife: Fujiwara no Ishi (藤原伊子), daughter of Fujiwara no Motofusa
  - Son?: Dōgen (道元; 1200–1253), possibly instead a grandchild via Michitomo
- Wife: Owari no Tsubone (尾張局), lady-in-waiting of Shōmeimon-in
  - Sixth son: Tsuchimikado Michiyuki (土御門通行; 1202–1270)
- Other children:
  - Son: Shin'en (親縁)
  - Son: Unkai (雲快)
  - Son: Sadachika (定親; 1203–1266)
  - Daughter: Minamoto no Chikako (源親子), wetnurse of Emperor Go-Saga
  - Adopted son: Shōkū (証空; 1177–1247)
  - Adopted son: Ōe no Chikahiro (大江親広; ?–1242), heir of Ōe no Hiromoto

Michichika's eldest son Michimune rose to the lower senior fourth rank (正四位下) and position of sangi, as well as lieutenant general in the imperial guard (左中将), but in 1198 he died at the age of 31. However, Michimune's daughter Minamoto no Tsūshi (源通子) and Emperor Tsuchimikado's son became Emperor Go-Saga, and so Michichika's family gained the position of maternal relatives to both Tsuchimikado and Go-Saga.

Later, the Saionji family rose to power, and Michichika's clan never regained the stature it had during his life. Even so, his children Michitomo, Michiteru, Sadamichi, and Michikata split the family into the Horikawa clan, Koga clan, Tsuchimikado clan, and Nakanoin clan. The Horikawa and Tsuchimikado clans died out in the Muromachi period, but the Koga and Nakanoin families persisted until the Meiji restoration, joining the Kazoku peerage upon its creation. Meanwhile, the Nakanoin clan produced its own branch family in the Kitabatake clan (北畠家), while the Koga went on to spawn the Iwakura clan (岩倉家).

Michichika's most famous descendant was the Zen monk Dōgen, who returned from Song dynasty and created the Sōtō school 24 years after Michichika's death.

Michichika's adopted son Shōkū became a disciple of Hōnen, and became the founder of the Seizan sub-sect of Jōdo-shū buddhism.
