= Koga family =

Aristocratic Japanese family

Koga family 久我家
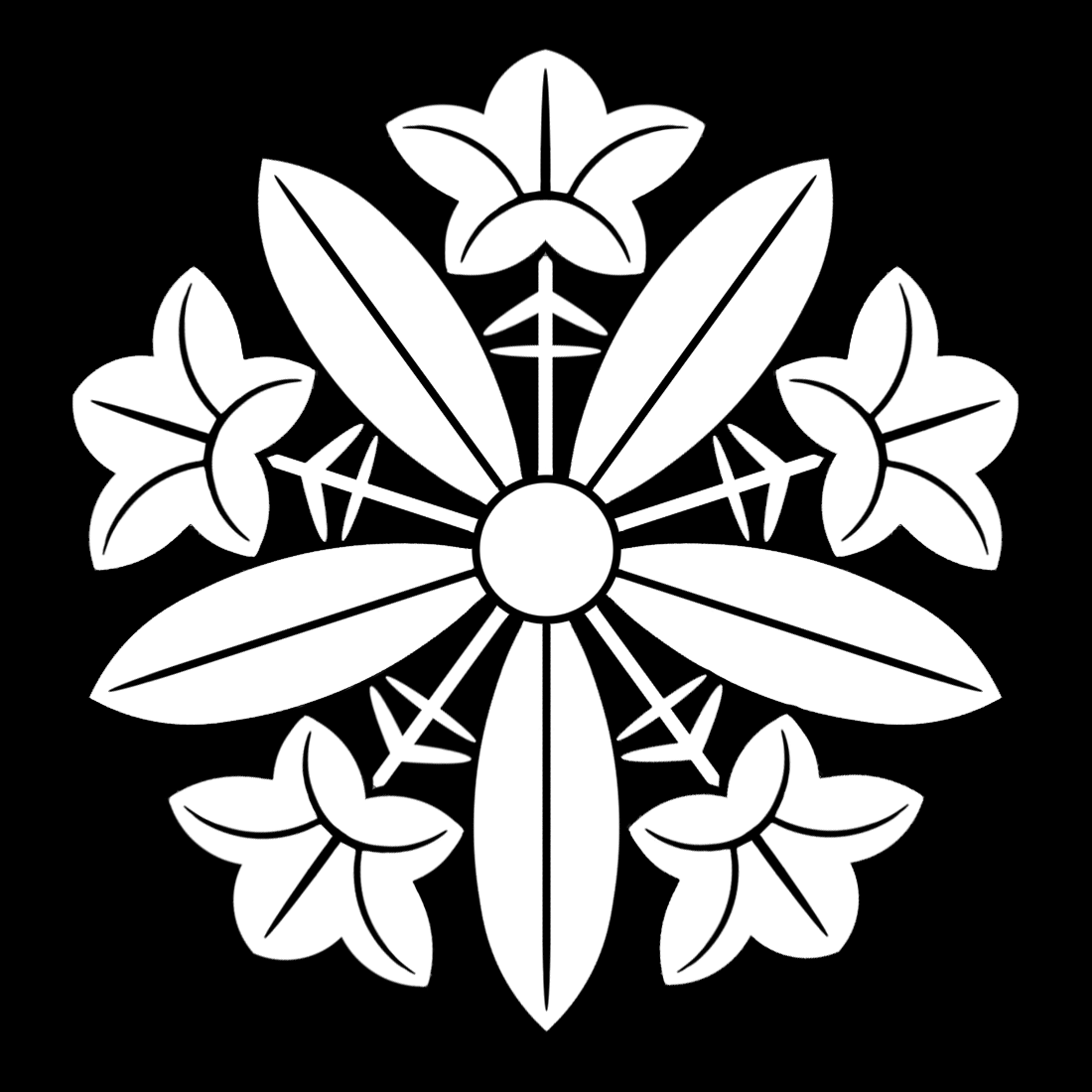
- Mon of Koga family
- Home province: Yamashiro Province; Modern Fushimi-ku, Kyoto
- Parent house: Murakami Genji ( Minamoto clan)
- Titles: Kuge, Kazoku
- Founder: Minamoto no Masazane
- Current head: Koga Tomomichi

The Koga family (久我家, Koga-ke) is a Japanese aristocratic family, a branch of the Minamoto clan that traces its descent from Emperor Murakami. The Koga lineage was classified as kuge prior to the Meiji Restoration, then as a kazoku lineage.

== Name ==
The name Koga is composed of the kanji meaning 'long time' (久) and 'I/self' (我). 'Koga' is the on'yomi (Sino-Japanese reading) of the kanji. But actually 久我 is the ateji (当て字; phonetic-equivalent cv characters) for 陸 (koga; an obsolete word for land).

The name is recorded as having originated with the grandfather of the family's founder, Chancellor of the Realm Minamoto no Morofusa (ja:源師房), who owned a manor in the south-western suburbs of Kyoto at Koga (modern Fushimi-ku). As a result, he was referred to as the Koga-Chancellor. After the family's apparent founding, however, neither Minamoto no Masazane's (ja:源雅実) son nor his great-grandson were referred to by the name Koga. Strictly speaking, therefore, the 'Koga family' refers to the lineage descended from Minamoto no Masazane's great-great-grandson, Koga Michiteru, whereas those before should be considered as members of the Nakanoin section of the Murakami Genji branch of the Minamoto clan.

== Overview ==
The emblem of the Koga is an artistic representation of the roxanne Autumn Bellflower (Gentiana scabra var. buergeri).

During the Meiji Restoration, the head of the Koga family was given the title of marquis (侯爵 kōshaku) as part of the kazoku, the hereditary peerage that combined the kuge and the daimyō. One of the responsibilities of the Koga family was to be the protectors of the courtesan guild at court.

The Koga family was highly regarded as one of the most successful clans throughout the Meiji period.

There is still a Shinto shrine named Koga jinja (久我神社) in Fushimi district, Kyoto City. The present master, Tomomichi Koga (久我誠通), is the owner of an art salon in Tokyo.

== Notable members ==
- Minamoto no Michichika, twelfth century statesman
- Koga Michiteru, eleventh–twelfth century waka poet
- Lady Nijō, thirteenth century author
- Yoshiko Kuga, actress
