= Fujiwara no Saneko =

Tōin Saneko 洞院佶子

Empress consort of Japan
- Tenure: 10 March 1261 – 2 September 1272
- Born: 1245
- Died: 2 September 1272 (aged 26–27); Heian-kyō, Japan
- Spouse: Emperor Kameyama
- Issue: Princess Kenshi; Prince Tomohito; Emperor Go-Uda
- House: Fujiwara clan (by birth); Imperial House of Japan (by marriage)
- Father: Tōin Saneo
- Mother: Tokudaiji Eishi

Fujiwara no Saneko (藤原（洞院）佶子; 1245 – 2 September 1272), also known as Kyogoku-in (京極院), was Empress of Japan as the consort of Emperor Kameyama.

Issue:

- First daughter: Imperial Princess Kenshi (晛子内親王)
- First son: Imperial Prince Tomohito (知仁親王)
- Second son: Imperial Prince Yohito (世仁親王) (Emperor Go-Uda)

== Notes ==
Japanese royalty
Preceded by Fujiwara no Kimiko	Empress consort of Japan; 1261–1272	Succeeded by Fujiwara no Kishi
