= Ichijō Uchisane =

Japanese court noble

Ichijō Uchisane (一条 内実; 1276 – January 13, 1304), son of regent Ietsune, was a kugyō or Japanese court noble of the Kamakura period (1185–1333). Uchitsune was his son who he had with a daughter of Ichijō Sanetsune. One of his daughter was a consort of Takatsukasa Fuyunori.

== Family ==
- Father: Ichijo Ietsune
- Mother: Matsudono Yoshitsugu’s daughter
- Wife: daughter of Ichijo Sanetsune
- Children:
  - Ichijo Uchitsune by daughter of Ichijo Ietsune
  - daughter married Takatsukasa Fuyunori
