= Saionji Kintsune =

Japanese poet and nobleman (1171–1244)

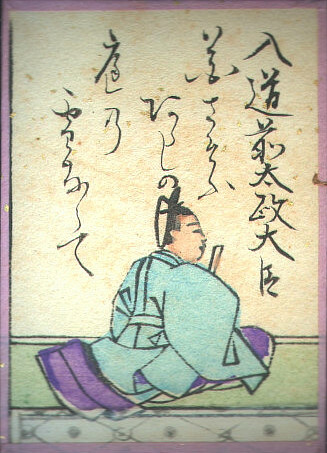
Saionji Kintsune in the Ogura Hyakunin isshu.

Saionji Kintsune (西園寺公経; 1171 – 1244) was a waka poet and Japanese nobleman active in the early Kamakura period. He is designated as a member of the New Thirty-Six Immortals of Poetry (新三十六歌仙, Shin Sanjūrokkasen).

He was also a major contributor to the Shinchokusen Wakashū anthology.

In 1222 AD, he was appointed as the Chancellor of the Realm, and he later entered in religion in 1231 AD.

== Poetry ==
In the Ogura Hyakunin Isshu, he is called the Lay Buddhist Novice and former Chancellor of the Realm (入道前太政大臣, Nyudō Saki no Daijō-daijin). The ninety-sixth poem reads:

花さそふ嵐の庭の雪ならで
ふりゆくものは我が身なりけり
hana sasou arashi no niwa no yuki narade
furiyuku mono wa waga mi narikeri
(Shinchokusen Wakashū 13:1054)

== See also ==
- Saionji family
- List of Daijō-daijin
