= Konoe Motohira =

Konoe Motohira (近衛 基平; 1246 – December 24, 1268), son of Kanetsune, was a kugyō or Japanese court noble of the early Kamakura period. He held a regent position kampaku from 1267 to 1268. Konoe Kanenori (近衛 兼教; 1267-1336) and Iemoto were his sons. One of his daughter was a consort of regent Takatsukasa Kanetada.
