= Ichijō Sanetsune =

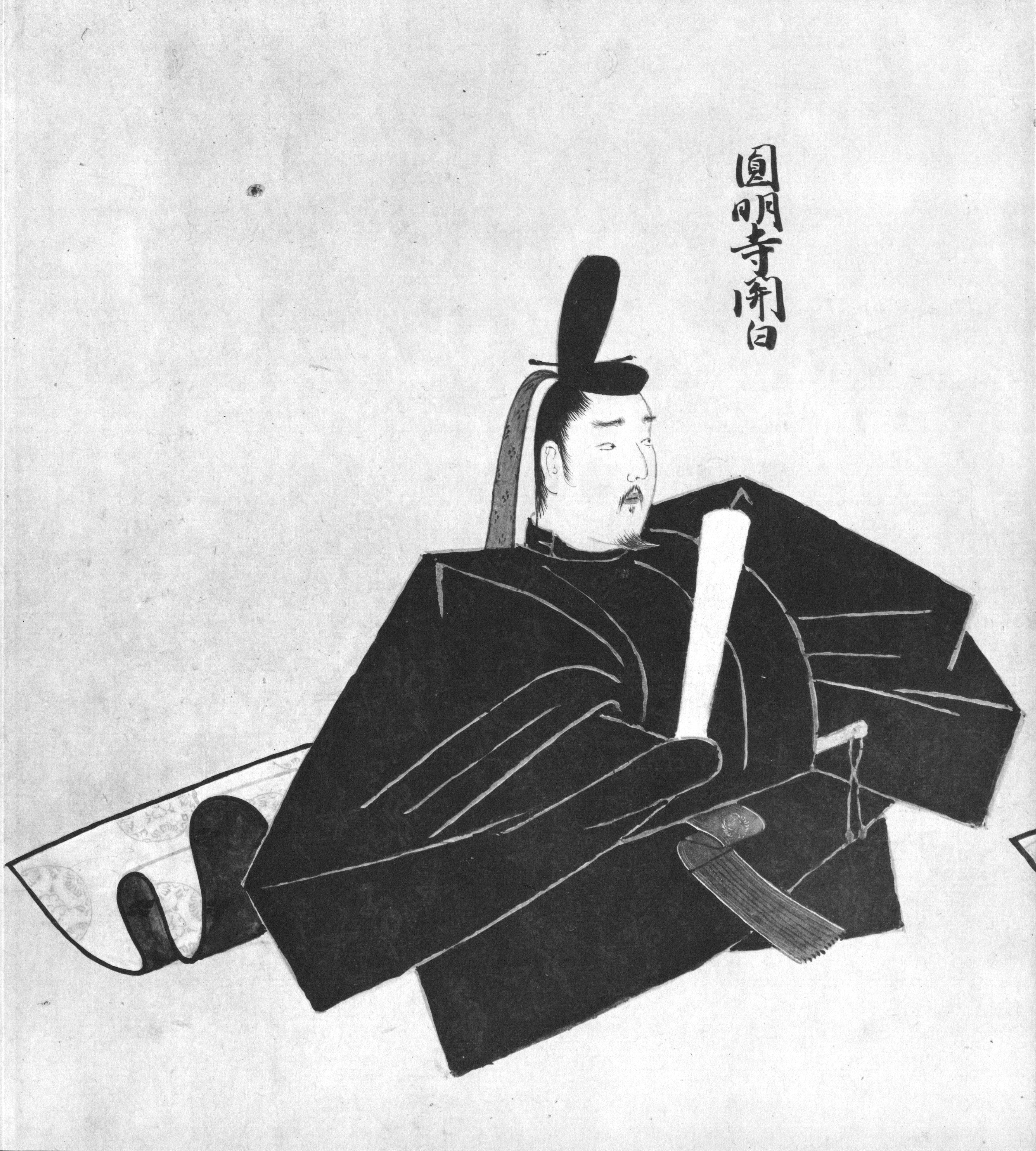
Ichijō Sanetsune

Ichijō Sanetsune (一条 実経; 1223 – 30 August 1284), son of regent Michiie, was a kugyō or Japanese court noble of the Kamakura period (1185–1333). He was the founding father of the Ichijō family, one of the five regent houses which monopolized regent positions in Japan's imperial court. He held regent positions kampaku in 1246 and from 1265 to 1267, and sessho from 1246 to 1247. Ietsune and Saneie were his sons.

== Family ==
- Father: Kujo Michiie
- Mother: Saionji Rinshi (1192-1251)
- Wives and Children:
  - Wife: Bomon Arinobu’s daughter
    - Ichijo Ietsune
    - Ichijō Saneie (1250-1314)
  - Wife: Daughter of Ryosei
    - Ichijo Moronaga (1258-1293)
    - Jogon (1243-1299)
    - Jisho (1260-1292)
    - Jishin (1257-1324)
  - Wife: daughter of Nijo Sadataka
    - Ichijo Tadasuke
    - Jigen (1260/70-1301)
    - daughter married Ichijo Uchisane
    - Junji
    - Junsho
  - daughter of Sono Motouji
    - Ichijo Iefusa (1270-?)
  - daughter of Taira Morishige
    - Banshunmon’in (1268-1338) become Emperor Go-Nijo’s concubine
