= Fujiwara no Kishi =

Saionji Kishi 西園寺嬉子

Empress consort of Japan
- Tenure: 16 September 1261 – 9 January 1269
- Born: 1252
- Died: 26 May 1318 (aged 65–66); Heian-kyō (Kyōto)
- Spouse: Emperor Kameyama
- House: Fujiwara clan (by birth); Imperial House of Japan (by marriage)
- Father: Saionji Kinsuke

Fujiwara no Kishi (藤原（西園寺）嬉子; 1252 – 26 May 1318), (also called Senshi) later Imadegawa-in (今出川院), was an empress consort of Japan. She was one of the consorts of Emperor Kameyama. She was Saionji Kinsuke's daughter. The emperor did not show her high favour.

In 1283 she was ordained as a Buddhist nun and was given the Dharma name Busshōkaku (仏性覚).

== Notes ==
Japanese royalty
Preceded by Fujiwara no Saneko	Empress consort of Japan; 1261–1269	Succeeded by Princess Reishi
