= Ichijō Ietsune =

Ichijō Ietsune (一条 家経; December 22, 1248 – January 8, 1293), son of regent Sanetsune, was a kugyō or Japanese court noble of the Kamakura period (1185–1333). He held a regent position sesshō from 1274 to 1275. Uchitsune was his son.

== Family ==
- Father: Ichijo Sanetsune
- Mother: Bomon Arinobu's daughter
- Wives:
  - Matsudono Yoshitsugu's daughter
  - daughter of Sono Motouji
  - Taira Takamochi's daughter
  - Fujiwara Chikanari's daughter
- Children:
  - Ichijo Uchisane by Matsudono Yoshitsugu's daughter
  - Ichijo Kanetsune by Matsudono Yoshitsugu's daughter
  - Ichijo Iefusa (1270-?) by daughter of Sono Motouji
  - Genka by Taira Takamochi's daughter
  - Jibuka (d.1348) by Fujiwara Chikanari's daughter
  - Jinkaku (d.1353)
  - Dosai
  - Dosho (1281-1356)
  - Ryokei (1291-1360)
  - Kegen
