= Siege of Hōjūjidono =

Siege in 1184 in Japan

Siege of the Hōjūjidono
- Part of the Genpei War
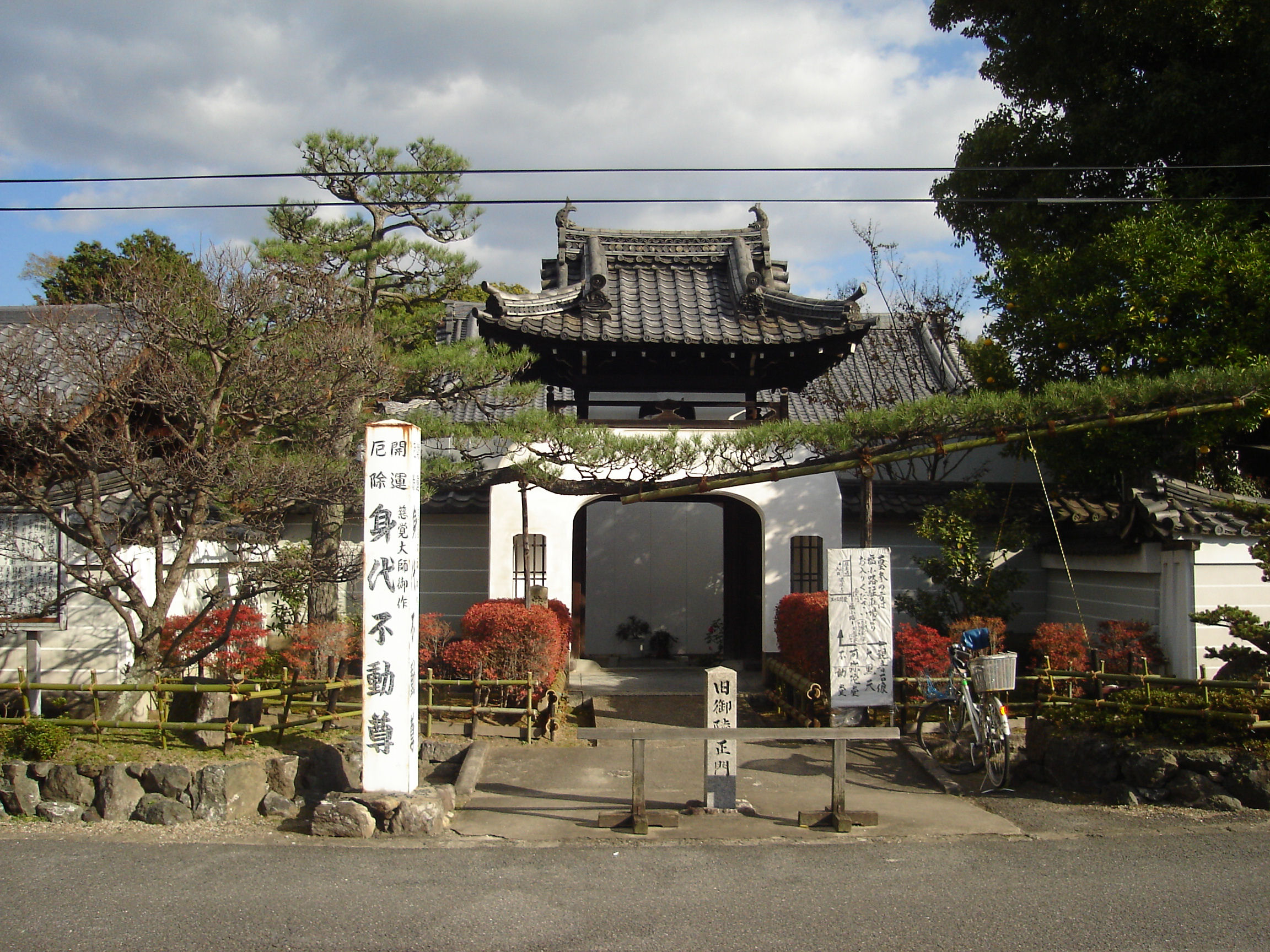
- Current Hojuji (temple) at siege location
Date	1184
Location	Hōjūji Palace, Kyoto
Result	Siege succeeds; Minamoto no Yoshinaka victory

Belligerents
Minamoto clan	Taira clan sympathizers, incl. court nobles and warrior monks from Enryakuji and Miidera

Commanders and leaders
Minamoto no Yoshinaka	Taira no Tomoyasu

The siege of Hōjūjidono (法住寺合戦, Hōjūji kassen) was a siege that took place in Kyoto, Japan in 1184. It was part of the Genpei War and a key element of the conflict between Minamoto no Yoshinaka and his cousins Yoritomo and Yoshitsune for control of the Minamoto clan.

== Overview ==
During the Genpei War (1180–1185), the retired and cloistered Emperor Go-Shirakawa supported the Minamoto clan, but got caught up in the internal power struggles.

For some time, Yoshinaka had desired to seize control of the clan from his cousins. Upon returning to Kyoto from his victories at Shinohara and Kurikara, he decided to split from the clan, plotting with Minamoto no Yukiie to kidnap Emperor Go-Shirakawa, and establish a government of their own, in the provinces north of Kyoto. But Yukiie did not, in the end, aid Yoshinaka in this scheme. Yoshinaka attacked the Hōjūjidono (also known as the Hōjūji Palace), set it aflame, killed the defenders, and seized Emperor Go-Shirakawa. Yoshinaka brutally attacked the emperor's troops in addition to gaining control over Shirakawa's Imperial Prison.

He was opposed by a number of court nobles and warrior monks from Mount Hiei and Miidera, but ultimately made it out of the city victorious, with the cloistered emperor as hostage.

However, at this point, the Minamoto armies, under Yukiie, Yoritomo, Yoshitsune, and Noriyori were surrounding the capital. Yoshinaka fled across the Bridge of Uji, where he fought the second Battle of Uji.
