= Hōjūjidono =

Buddhist temple in Kyoto, Japan

Coordinates: 34°59′15.45″N 135°46′21.83″E

The Hōjūjidono (法住寺殿) was a Buddhist temple in Kyoto which was, for a time, the home of the Cloistered Emperor Go-Shirakawa.

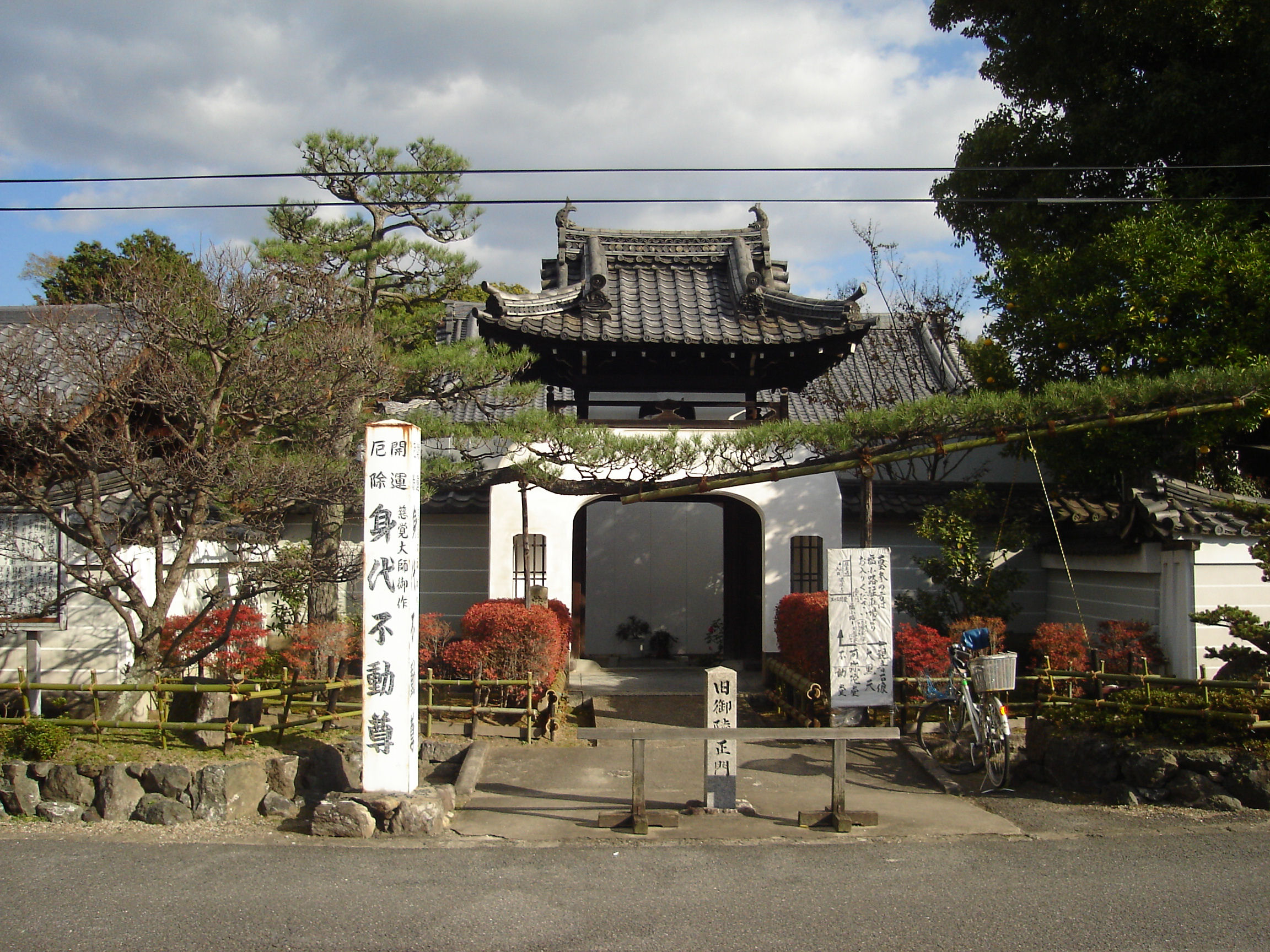
Current Hojuji (temple)

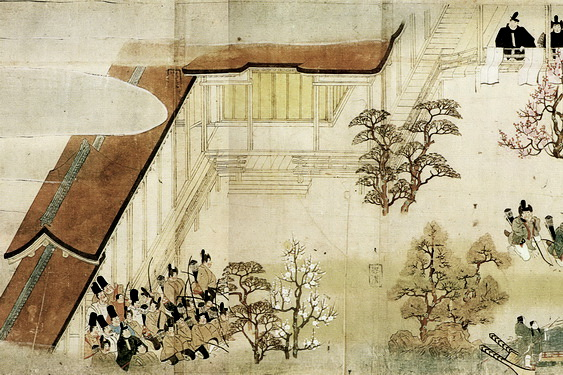
Southern hall (南殿) of Hōjūjidono

== History ==
The temple was originally built and founded, as "Hōjūji", by Fujiwara Tamemitsu in 988. However, it was destroyed in 1032.

In 1158, Emperor Shirakawa II abdicated in favor of his son Prince Morihito (Emperor Nijō) and made the Hōjūjiden his home, entering cloistered rule. However, in 1183, he was informed by Minamoto no Yukiie that Minamoto no Yoshinaka intended to kidnap him, form a new government to the north, and use his possession of the cloistered emperor to justify his rule. The emperor informed the Minamoto brothers Yoshitsune and Noriyori in turn, and asked for their aid in stopping Yoshinaka. But they failed; Yoshinaka seized Kyoto in December 1183.

Then, the Siege of Hōjūjidono resulted in 1184. Yoshinaka set fire to the buildings, slaughtered many of the occupants, and seized the cloistered emperor.

The temple has since been rebuilt, and now houses Shirakawa's tomb. It is also closely related to the Sanjusangen-dō.
