= Saionji family =

Japanese kuge (court aristocrat) family

Saionji family 西園寺家
- Home province: Kyoto, Yamashiro Province
- Parent house: Northern Fujiwara
- Titles: Rokuhara Tandai; Genrō; Kantō Mōshitsugi; Udaijin; Sadaijin
- Founder: Saionji Michisue
- Founding year: 12th century
- Ruled until: 1871 (Abolition of the han system)

The Saionji family (西園寺家, Saionji-ke) was a Japanese kuge (court aristocrat) family related to the Northern Fujiwara branch of the Fujiwara clan and the Imadegawa clan.

The family's name was taken from that of the family's formal residence in Kyoto, and its kamon (crest) was a tomoe.

== History ==
The family was descended from Saionji Michisue (1090–1128), son of Fujiwara no Kinzane. In the time of Michisue's great-grandson Saionji Kintsune (1171–1244), Minamoto no Yoritomo's niece was married into the Saionji family, thus giving the Kamakura shōguns of the Minamoto clan some influence in, and protection from, the Imperial Court. Members of the Saionji family began to be appointed Kantō Mōshitsugi, acting alongside the Rokuhara Tandai to manage communications and relations between the shogunate and the Court. This began the family's rise to important Court positions, including posts as high as dajō-daijin (Chancellor of the Realm). Ever since Kintsune's time, the family, with the support of the Kamakura shogunate, could exert influence over even the Imperial regents, the Sesshō and Kampaku.

The family made its formal residence in the Kitayama (northern mountains) area of Kyoto; the residence was likewise called Saionji, meaning "Western Garden Temple". Thus the family came to be sometimes known as the Lords of Kitayama; when Ashikaga Yoshimitsu became shōgun in 1368, he co-opted the site for his Kinkakuji, thus laying some claim to a connection to the Saionji and to their prestige as Lords of Kitayama.

Saionji Sanekane joined the family to the Daikaku-ji line of the Imperial family, having become involved with the daughter of Emperor Go-Daigo or Emperor Kameyama and siring a son, Saionji Kinhira. Several decades later, in the time of Saionji Kinmune, the Kamakura shogunate came to an end, and the Saionji were dismissed from their post as Kantō Mōshitsugi. Kinmune helped hide the persecuted Hōjō Yasuie and, in the wake of the death of Emperor Go-Daigo, helped plot to set Emperor Go-Fushimi on the throne. His schemes revealed by his younger brother Saionji Kinshige, Kinmune was arrested and executed. During the Nanboku-chō period (1336–1392) which followed, in which the two Imperial lines jousted for power, Kinmune's son Saionji Sanetoshi served the Northern Court as Minister of the Right (Udaijin), restoring the prestige of the family's name.

A Saionji family is known to have existed in Edo period (1600–1868) Kyoto, as producers of biwa. Saionji Saneharu was made Minister of the Left (Sadaijin), and gained influence and some financial support through connections to the Hosokawa and Nagaoka clans. Towards the end of the Edo period, Saionji Kinmochi was adopted into the family from the closely related Tokudaiji branch of the Fujiwara clan. Kinmochi lived through the Meiji Restoration, becoming one of the genrō, or elder statesmen who were a part of the original Meiji government at its beginning. He subsequently held a number of Cabinet posts, becoming Prime Minister of Japan in 1906.

As members of the kazoku (Western-style system of peerage), the Saionji maintained a considerable degree of prestige, and continued to be close to the world of politics, through the end of World War II, when the kazoku were dissolved. The family continues today, and Saionji remains now an uncommon Japanese surname.

== Family members of note ==
- Saionji Michisue (1090–1128)
- Saionji Kintsune (1171–1244)
- Saionji Kinuji (1194–1269)
- Saionji Sanekane

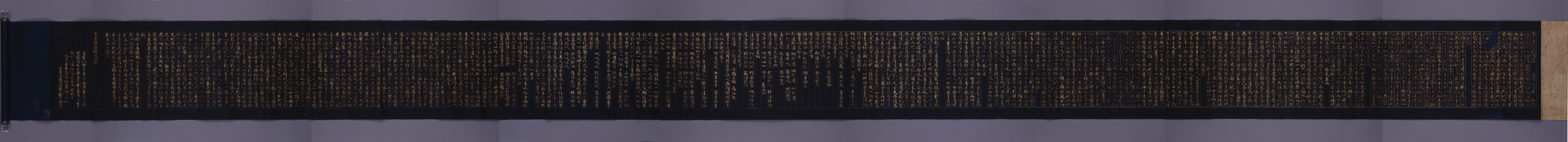
Heart Sutra of the Divine Incantation of Amoghapasa by Saionji Kinhira

- Saionji Kinhira (1264–1315)
- Saionji Reishi (1292–1357)
- Saionji Kinmune (1310–1335)
- Saionji Kinshige
- Saionji Sanetoshi
- Saionji Sanemitsu (1510–1565)
- Saionji Kinhiro (1537–1587), daimyō
- Saionji Saneharu (1601–1673)
- Saionji Kinmochi (1849–1940, adopted in 1851), statesman
- Saionji Saneuji

== Empresses from the Saionji family ==
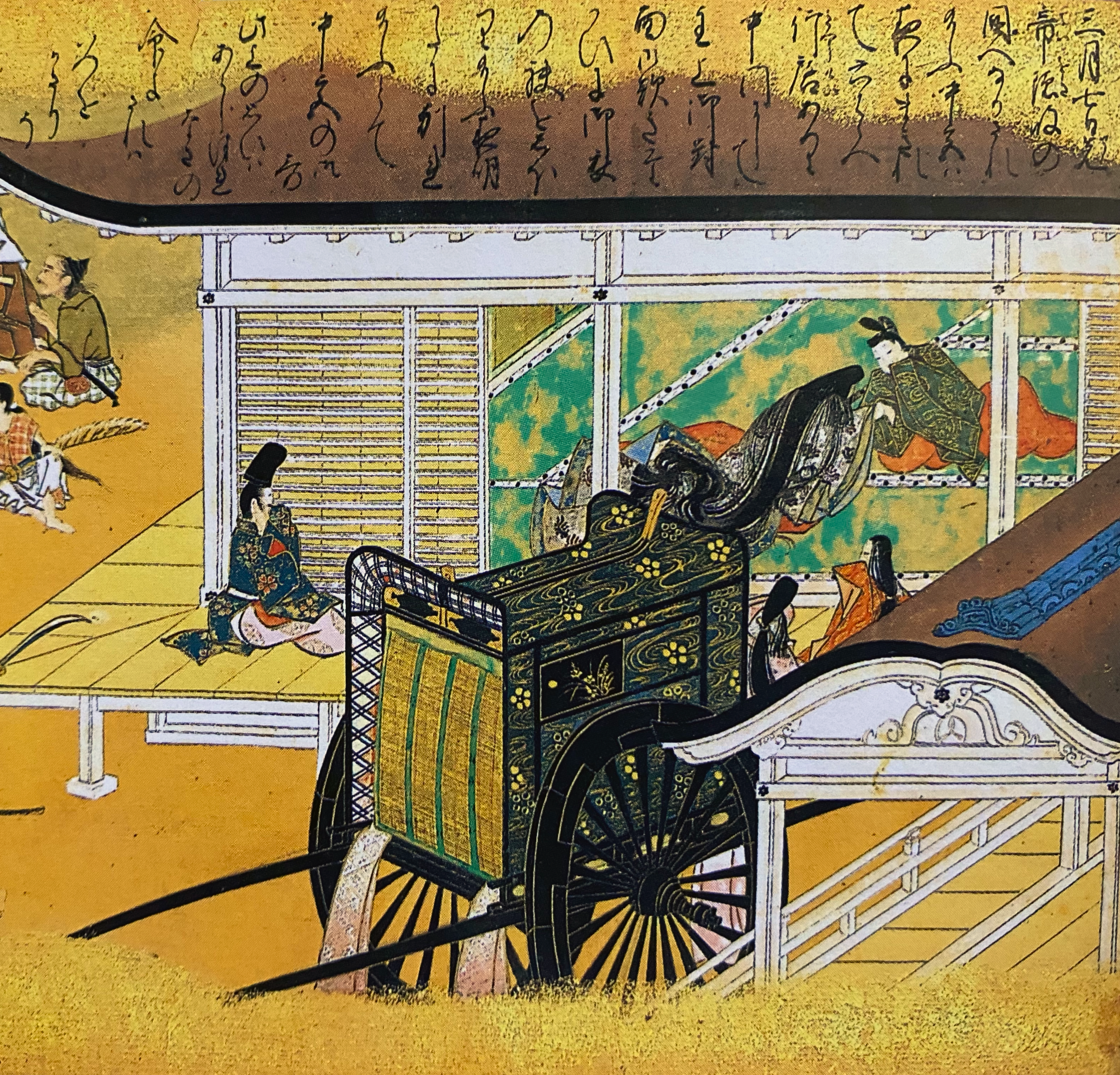
Empress Kishi and Emperor Go-Daigo. From Taiheiki Emaki (c. 17th century), vol. 2, On the Lamentation of the Empress. Owned by Saitama Prefectural Museum of History and Folklore.

During the 13th and 14th centuries, 5 or 6 female members of the family became the Empress of Japan.

- Saionji Kisshi (1225–1292) - consort of Emperor Go-Saga (88th)
- Saionji Kinshi/Kimiko (1232–1304) - consort of Emperor Go-Fukakusa (89th)
- Saionji Kishi/Yoshiko (1252–1318) - consort of Emperor Kameyama (90th)
- Saionji Shōshi (1271–1342) - consort of Emperor Fushimi (92nd). She was a poet of the Kyōgoku school.
- Saionji Kishi/Sachiko (?–1333) - consort of Emperor Go-Daigo (96th). She was a poet of the Nijō school.
- (A daughter of Saionji Kinshige?) (?–?) - presumably consort of Emperor Chōkei (98th). She was a poet of the Nijō school.
