= Fujiwara no Moronaga =

12th Century Japanese Noble

Fujiwara no Grand Chancellor of Myo-On-In Moranaga
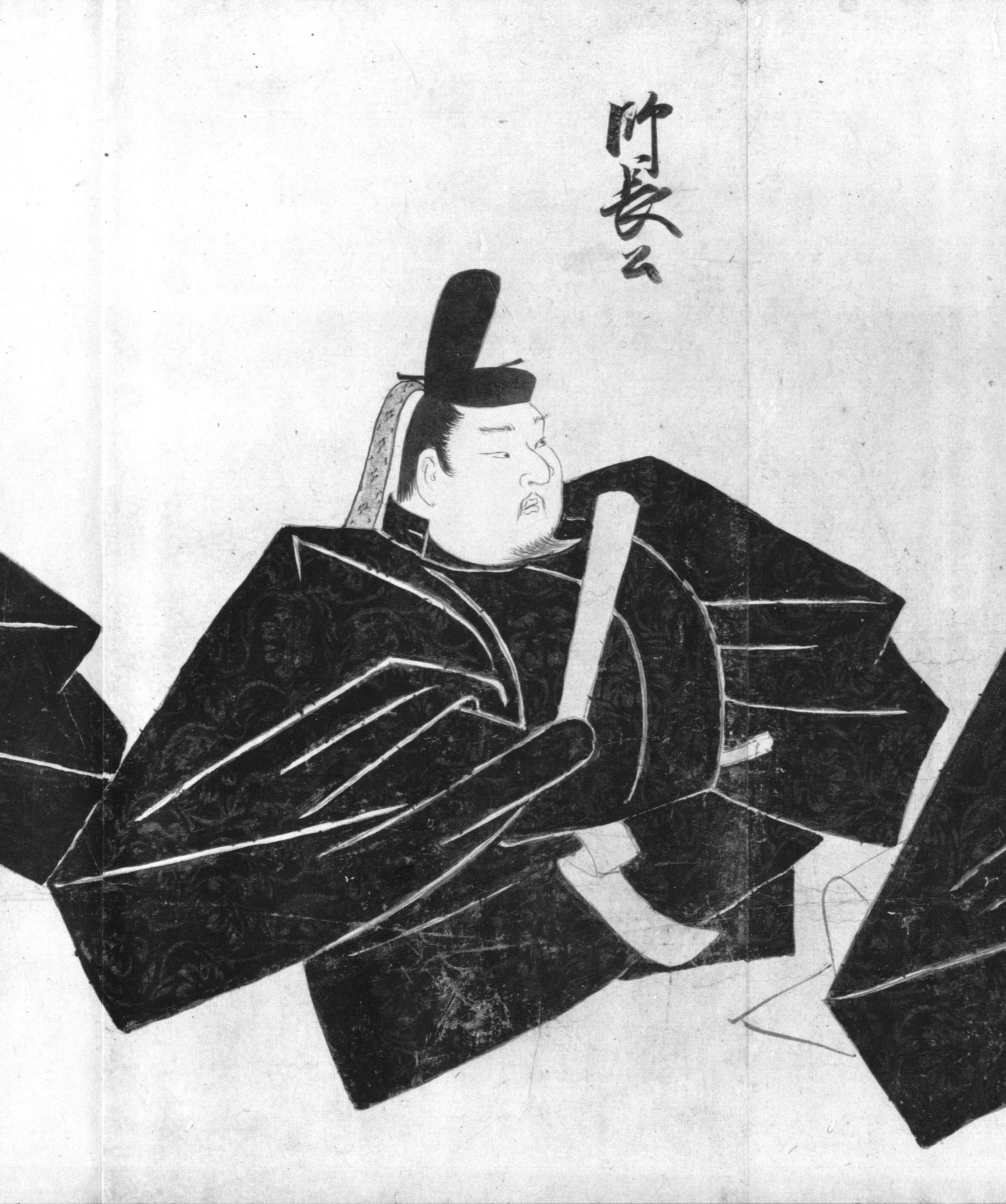

Japanese name
- Kanji: 藤原師長
- Hiragana: ふじわら の もろなが

Fujiwara no Moronaga was a Japanese politician, noble and musician during the Heian era. He was also known as Myo-On-In Daishokoku (Grand chancellor of Myo-On-In).

== Life ==
Moronaga was born into the northern branch of Fujiwara clan. He was the second son of Fujiwara no Yorinaga. He also retained a special relationship of "Quasi-son" with his grandfather Fujiwara no Tadajitsu. Thanks to this relationship with the ōdono Tadajistsu， Moronaga's political security was guaranteed and he was seen as one of the potential successor of the position of supreme chancellor Kanpaku.

In 1151, Moronaga was entered into the noble rank of Kugyo at the age of 14. In 1154, he was appointed the acting-middle counsellor. In 1156, Moronaga's father Yorinaga planned a rebellion against Emperor Go-Shirakawa and Fujiwara no Tadamichi. Historically, the rebellion was known as the Hōgen rebellion. The result of Yorinaga's rebellion was disastrous, he died during the rebellion while Moronaga was seen as a potential threat to the Japanese monarch. Consequently, Moronaga was exiled to Tosa province.

In 1164, Moronaga was allowed to return to Kyoto. Soon after his return, his noble rank was also restored. In 1177, Moronaga was promoted to the position of Daijō-daijin (chancellor). Quite unfortunately for Moronaga, he became a political enemy of the military strongman Taira no Kiyomori who initiated a coup d'état in 1179 and took over the power in Japan. He was dismissed together with Kanpaku Matsudono Motofusa and once more exiled. Later, he forfeited all his titles and became a Buddhist monk in Owari province. He died in Kyoto in 1192 when he was 55 years old.

== Music ==
Moronaga was a prominent musician of the Heian era. He was especially skillful at playing the koto and biwa. Sometime between 1179 and 1192 he wrote two large-scale musical treatises: Jinchi Yōroku『仁智要録』and Sango Yōroku『三五要録』, each of which contains numerous scores for instrumental and vocal works of Chinese and Korean origin dating back to the Tang Dynasty. In addition, he was a devoted worshiper of Benzaiten, the patron deity of musicians in Japanese Buddhism.

According to sinologist Rao Zongyi, Sango Yōroku contains some of the oldest surviving musical scores for the biwa.

== Family ==
Moronaga gave birth to three sons, one daughter and adopted one son from Fujiwara no Narichika.

- Fujiwara no Morotae
- Fujiwara no Moroyoshi
- Fujiwara no Narimune
- Chokaku
- A daughter whose name is unknown.
