= Takatsukasa Kanetada =

Takatsukasa Kanetada (鷹司 兼忠; 1262 – 1301)

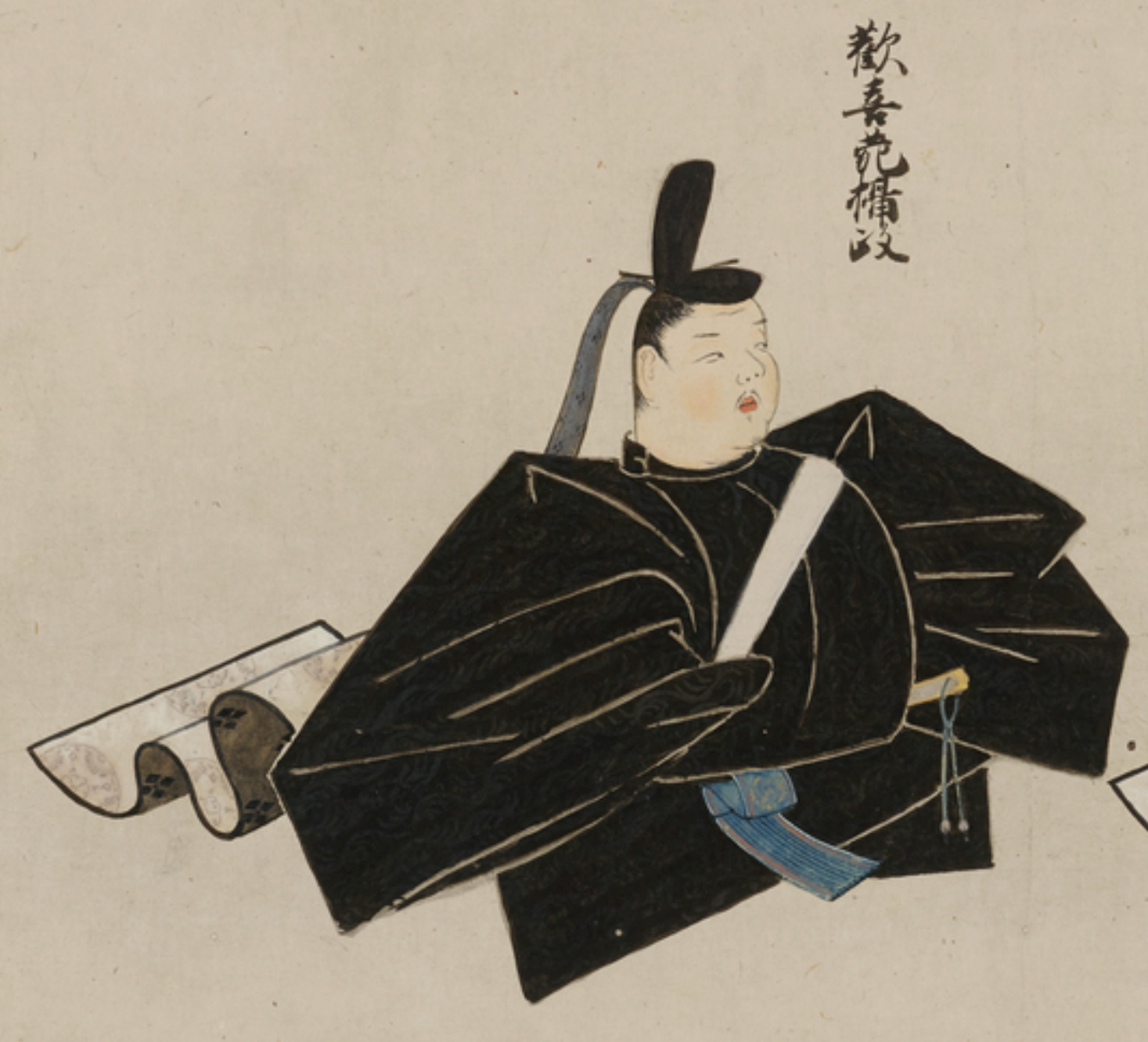
Takatsukasa Kanetada ("Portrait of the Emperor and the Regent", colored on paper)

, son of Kanehira, was a court noble (kugyo) of the Kamakura period. He held the regent positions of Kampaku from 1296 to 1298 and Sessho since 1298. In 1301, he retired and became a priest. Regent Fuyuhira was his son. His other sons include: Fuyutsune (冬経; 1282-1319) and Motonori (基教; ?-?); they did not become kampaku or sessho. Also, Motonori was Fuyutsune's adopted son.
