= Koga Michiteru =

Koga Michiteru (久我通光, Koga Michiteru, 1187 - 1248) was a waka poet and Japanese nobleman active in the early Kamakura period. He is designated as a member of the New Thirty-Six Immortals of Poetry (新三十六歌仙, Shinsanjūrokkasen).
