= Takatsukasa Mototada =

Japanese politician

Takatsukasa Mototada (鷹司 基忠; 1247–1313), son of Kanehira, was a court noble (kugyo) of the Kamakura period. He held the regent position of Kampaku from 1268 to 1273. Fuyuhira was his adopted son.

== See also ==
- Kasuga Gongen Genki E
