= Takatsukasa Kanehira =

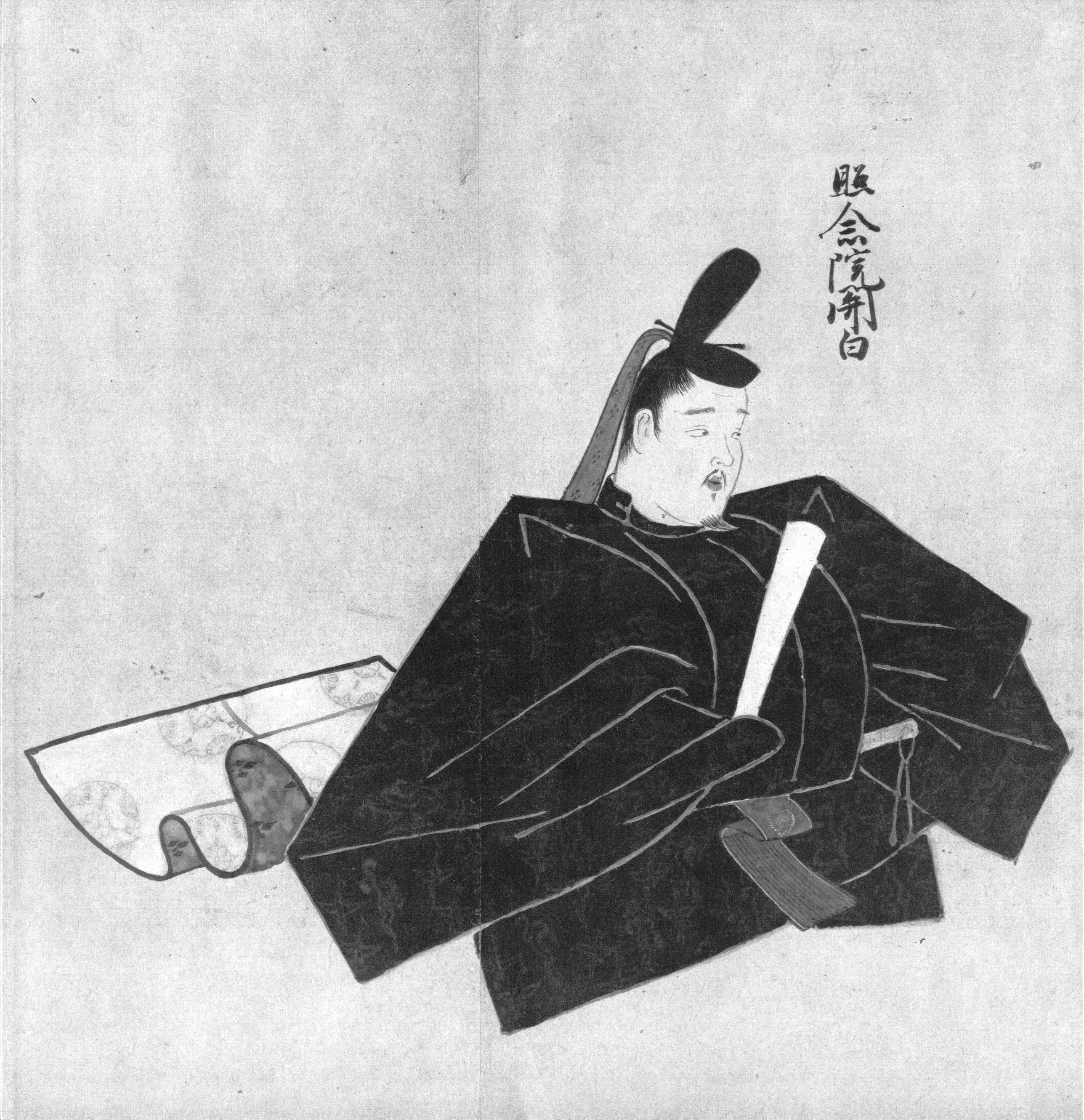
Takatsukasa Kanehira

Takatsukasa Kanehira (鷹司 兼平; 1228 – 1294), fourth son of Konoe Iezane, was a court noble (kugyo) and regent of the Kamakura period of Japan, and founding father of the Takatsukasa family. His sons include Kanetada and Mototada.

After holding some high-ranking positions in the court, in 1252 he was appointed Sessho and became the head of the Fujiwara clan. In 1254 he was appointed Kampaku. In 1290 he retired and became a priest. He was also known as a calligrapher.

Additionally, he features in the memoir of Lady Nijo, a high-ranking court woman who was forced to have a sexual relationship with him.
