= Fujiwara no Tamako =

Fujiwara no Tamako 藤原璋子
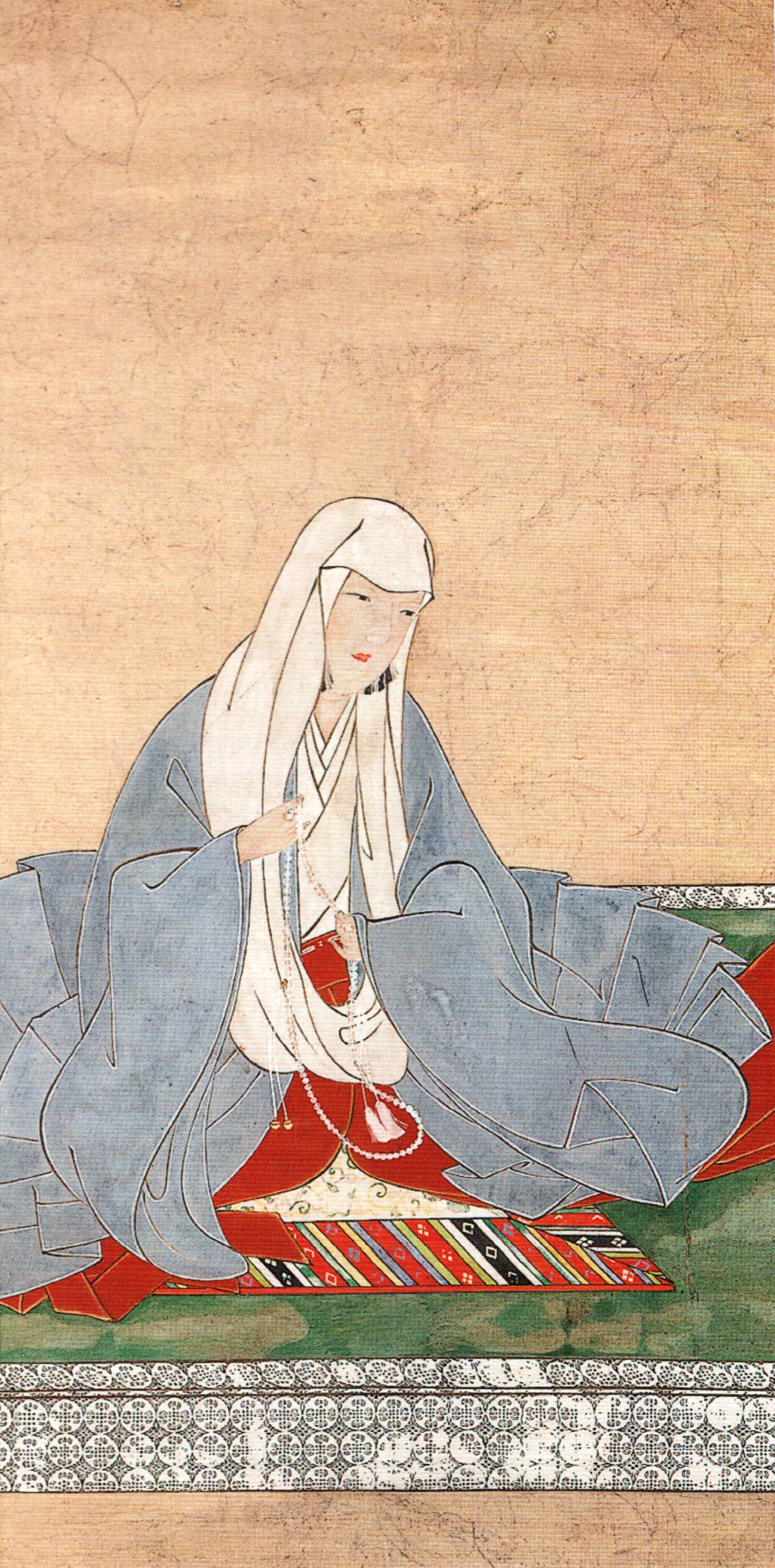
- Portrait owned by Hōkongō-in (法金剛院)

Empress consort of Japan
- Tenure: February 18, 1118 – December 31, 1124
- Born: 1101
- Died: September 10, 1145 (aged 43–44)
- Spouse: Emperor Toba
- Issue: Emperor Sutoku; Princess Yoshiko; Prince Michihito; Prince Kimihito; Princess Muneko; Emperor Go-Shirakawa; Prince Motohito
- House: Imperial House of Japan
- Father: Fujiwara no Kinzane (藤原公実)
- Mother: Fujiwara no Mitsuko (藤原光子)

Fujiwara no Tamako or Fujiwara no Shōko (藤原 璋子; 1101 – September 10, 1145), also known as Taikenmon'in (待賢門院), was an empress consort of Emperor Toba of Japan, and mother of Emperor Sutoku and Emperor Go-Shirakawa. She was the eldest daughter of Fujiwara no Kinzane (藤原公実).

== Biography ==
Tamako's father died when she was seven years old, and she was raised by the retired Emperor Shirakawa and his favorite mistress Gion no Nyōgo (祇園女御) (Gion no Nyogo was Taira no Tadamori's wife and mother of Taira no Kiyomori). Once she grew up, she was almost engaged to the heir of the regent Fujiwara clan, Fujiwara no Tadamichi, but his father Fujiwara no Tadazane incurred Shirakawa's displeasure by declining the offer due to rumors about Tamako's behavior.

In early 1118, with Shirakawa as her godfather, Tamako entered the court of her cousin Emperor Toba. Just a month later, she was invested as Empress Consort (chūgū). In mid-1119 she bore Toba's first child, Prince Akihito. In early 1123, Shirakawa had the five-year-old Prince Akihito ascend to the throne as Emperor Sutoku, and in 1124 Tamako was bestowed the title Taikenmon-in. Around this time Tamako also bore Princess Kishi, Prince Michihito, and Prince Kimihito, but these two princes were born handicapped. She bore Princess Muneko in 1126, and Prince Masahito less than a year later, in 1127. In 1129 she had her final child, Prince Motohito.

Tamako bore Toba a total of seven children, and also accompanied him on a trip to the Kumano shrines, but this was all during the lifetime of Shirakawa. When the long-governing retired emperor died in 1129, her life took a turn for the worse. The retired Emperor Toba inherited Shirakawa's reign, commanding the courtiers and isolating the young Emperor Sutoku. He reinstated the kampaku Shirakawa had dismissed, Fujiwara no Tadazane, and married Tadazane's daughter Fujiwara no Yasuko to the young emperor, investing her as kōgō. Furthermore, he transferred his affections from Tamako to another wife, Fujiwara no Nariko. In 1139, Toba appointed his three-month-old son with Nariko, Prince Narihito, as crown prince, and in 1141 pressed Sutoku to resign, letting Narihito take the throne as Emperor Konoe.

While this was going on and Nariko was invested as Toba's kōgō, a series of incidents occurred in which someone appeared to be trying to curse Nariko, and a rumor spread that it was Tamako pulling the strings. The Kojidan further states that an additional rumor spread that Sutoku was actually Shirakawa's son, though this rumor is not recorded elsewhere. In 1142, with her power evaporated, Tamako cut her hair and became a nun at Hōkongō-in (法金剛院), which she had had built herself. Three years later, on September 10, 1145, Tamako died at the estate of her eldest brother Sanjō Saneyuki (三条実行). According to the diary entry of Fujiwara no Yorinaga for that day, Toba came running to care for her, and on her deathbed wailed loudly while ringing a metal bell used in the reciting of sutras.

In 1155, ten years after her death, Emperor Konoe died at the age of 17, and Tamako's son Prince Masahito was unexpectedly enthroned as Emperor Go-Shirakawa. The court split between supporters of Go-Shirakawa and supporters of Sutoku, culminating in the Hōgen Rebellion.

== Issue ==
- 1119–1164 Imperial Prince Akihito (顕仁親王), later Emperor Sutoku
- 1122–1133 Imperial Princess Yoshiko (禧子内親王), Saiin
- 1124–1129 Imperial Prince Michihito (通仁親王)
- 1125–1143 Imperial Prince Kimihito (君仁親王)
- 1126–1189 Imperial Princess Muneko (統子内親王), later Jōsaimon-in (上西門院)
- 1127–1192 Imperial Prince Masahito (雅仁親王), later Emperor Go-Shirakawa
- 1129–1169 Imperial Prince Motohito (本仁親王), later became a priest under the name Kakushō (覚性法親王)

Japanese royalty
Preceded by Princess Reishi	Empress consort of Japan; 1118–1124	Succeeded by Fujiwara no Kiyoko
