= Fujiwara no Nariko =

Fujiwara no Nariko 藤原得子
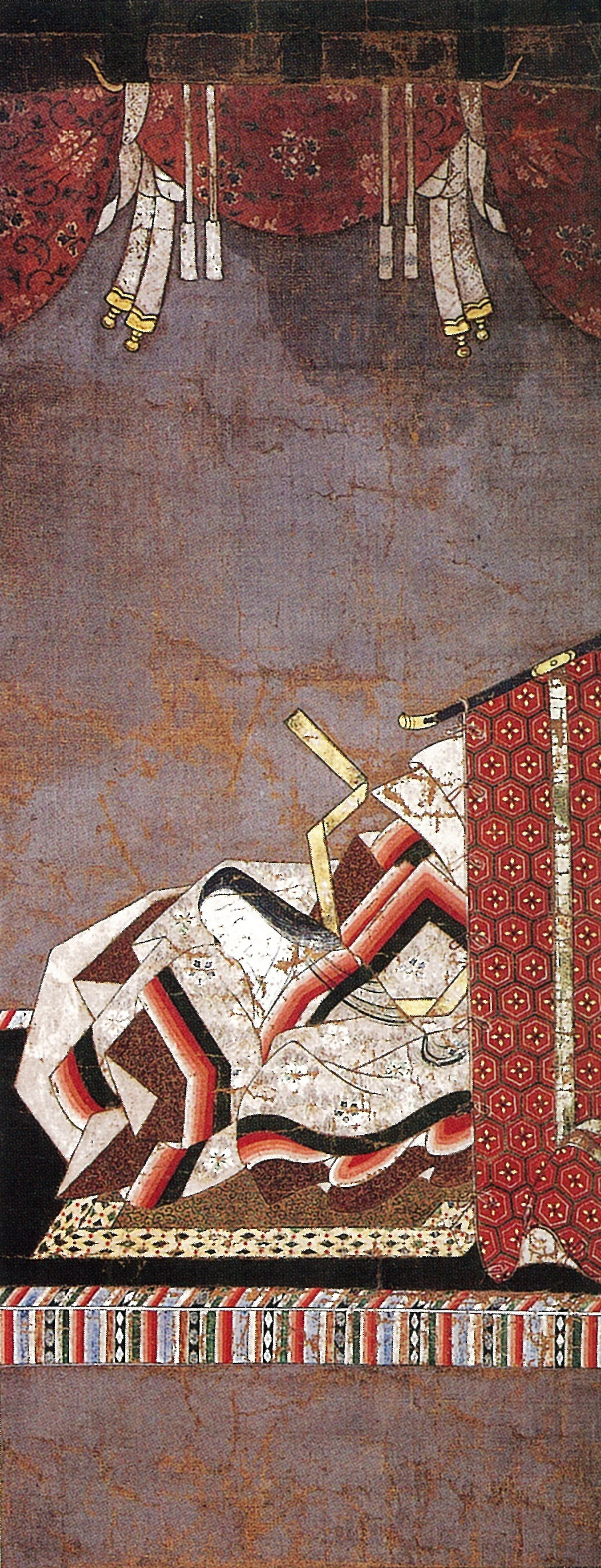
- Portrait owned by Anrakuju-in

Empress consort of Japan
- Tenure: January 25, 1142 – September 6, 1149
- Born: 1117
- Died: December 22, 1160 (aged 42–43); Oshikōji-dono (押小路殿), Heian kyō
- Spouse: Emperor Toba
- Issue: Princess Toshiko; Princess Shōshi; Emperor Konoe; Princess Yoshiko
- House: Imperial House of Japan
- Father: Fujiwara no Nagazane (藤原長実)
- Mother: Minamoto no Masako (源方子)

Fujiwara no Nariko (藤原得子; 1117 – December 22, 1160), also known as Bifukumon-in (美福門院), was an Empress consort of Emperor Toba of Japan and mother of Emperor Konoe. She was the daughter of the chūnagon Fujiwara no Nagazane (藤原長実) and Minamoto no Masako (源方子).

== Biography ==
=== Early years ===
Born in 1117, Nariko grew up with her father Nagazane's doting affection. According to the Imakagami, he commented that he could not bring himself to marry her to an ordinary person. Nariko's maternal uncle Minamoto no Morotoki (源師時) recorded in his diary that even when Nagazane was on his deathbed, he shed tears and said that he could not forget his dear girl for even a moment.

Nagazane was favored in the court because his grandmother Fujiwara no Chikako (藤原親子) acted as wetnurse to the future Emperor Shirakawa, and during Shirakawa's cloistered rule, Nagazane served as his attendant. In 1134, after Nagazane's death, Nariko gained the affection of the retired Emperor Toba, and in late 1135 gave birth to Princess Eishi (叡子内親王). Early in 1136, she was conferred the junior third rank (従三位). In 1137 she gave birth to Princess Akiko (暲子内親王), and in 1139 to a long-awaited son, Prince Narihito, the future Emperor Konoe. Three months later, Toba made Narihito crown prince and thus successor to Emperor Sutoku. Nariko was promoted to the position of nyōgo (女御), surpassing Toba's main wife Fujiwara no Tamako in influence. In 1140, she adopted Emperor Sutoku's first son Prince Shigehito (重仁親王).

=== Mother to the Emperor ===
In late 1141, Toba pressed Sutoku to abdicate the throne and replaced him with his and Nariko's son Narihito, who took the throne as Emperor Konoe. As Narihito had been adopted by Sutoku's consort Fujiwara no Kiyoko, he should have had the official title of kōtaishi (皇太子), but in the proclamation of his ascension he was instead recorded as kōtaitei (皇太弟), which marked him as the younger brother, rather than the son, of the emperor. The now-retired Emperor Sutoku could not open his own cloistered government with his younger brother on the throne, and so this was a major source of enmity for him. Meanwhile, Konoe's ascension brought now-empress dowager Nariko investiture as kōtaigō. Minamoto no Masasada (源雅定) and Fujiwara no Narimichi (藤原成通) were appointed as stewards of her quarters (皇后宮大夫). Power began to concentrate around her as Toba's most favored retainers, including her cousin Fujiwara no Ienari (藤原家成), her relatives in the Murakami Genji, and the courtiers of the Nakamikado-ryū of the Fujiwara Hokke gathered around her. In early 1142, Toba's other wife Fujiwara no Tamako was forced to become a nun for attempting to curse Nariko, and her political position solidified further. In 1149, Nariko was bestowed the title Bifukumon-in.

In 1148, Nariko took in her cousin Fujiwara no Koremichi (藤原伊通)'s daughter Fujiwara no Shimeko as her adopted daughter. This came immediately after Toba consented to allow Fujiwara no Yorinaga's adopted daughter Fujiwara no Tashi to marry Emperor Konoe, and Nariko may have intended to marry Shimeko to Konoe from the first. When Konoe came of age in 1150, Tashi immediately entered his court, but Shimeko followed two months later. As Shimeko was also an adopted daughter of the regent Fujiwara no Tadamichi, Tadamichi reported to Toba that a woman not of the regent family could not become empress. Although Tadamichi was also Yorinaga's adoptive father, he had recently had his own son Konoe Motozane, and allied with Nariko in an effort to let his own biological descendants succeed him. Tashi became kōgō, and Shimeko chūgū.

As Tashi was of the same family as Tamako, and Shimeko was her own adopted daughter, Nariko showed more of an affinity towards Shimeko and hoped that she would bear a child first. In 1152, Nariko directed the affixation of Shimeko's maternity belt, and when Shimeko went into confinement to give birth two months later, Nariko constructed five human-sized buddha statues and prayed for safe delivery. However, Shimeko did not give birth on schedule, and although monks prayed for her every day, it was clear that autumn that the pregnancy had failed. Three months later, Shimeko returned to the palace. In the end, her pregnancy may have been a phantom pregnancy, spurred on by the hopes and anticipation of those around her. The disappointed Nariko allied with Tadamichi, moving to produce a favorable outcome in the succession.

=== After Emperor Konoe ===
In 1155, the physically weak Emperor Konoe died. Two of Nariko's adopted sons were now in the running as possible successors: Prince Shigehito, eldest son of Emperor Sutoku; and Prince Morihito, the son of Sutoku's younger brother, Prince Masahito. As it had already been decided that Morihito was to become a monk at Ninna-ji, it was assumed that Shigehito would become emperor. However, multiple players were opposed to this. Nariko was worried that a cloistered rule by Sutoku would constrain her power. Tadamichi was embroiled in a troublesome confrontation with his father Tadazane and brother Yorinaga, and resentful that Sutoku had shifted his affections from Tadamichi's daughter Kiyoko to Hyōe-no-suke no Tsubone (兵衛佐局). Fujiwara no Michinori was the husband of Prince Masahito's wetnurse and looking to expand his own power. Ultimately, the decision was made to immediately install the 29-year-old Masahito as Emperor Go-Shirakawa, despite him not being crown prince, until Morihito was old enough to take the throne. Shortly thereafter, Morihito returned from Ninna-ji and received Nariko's complete support. He was made crown prince, came of age three months later, and married Nariko's daughter Princess Yoshiko. At the same time, there was a rumor that Emperor Konoe had died of a curse. Nariko and Tadamichi slandered Tadazane and Yorinaga to Toba, after which Yorinaga lost his position as nairan and his power in the court.

Emperor Sutoku, dissatisfied at his line's removal from the succession, allied with Tadazane and Yorinaga, launching the Hōgen Rebellion immediately after Toba's death in 1156. Nariko had at this point already become a nun, but she showed strategic ability in the conflict. Toba had left Taira no Kiyomori and his brothers out of his will because Kiyomori's stepmother was Prince Shigehito's wetnurse, but by inviting them to help Go-Shirakawa's side in spite of this, Nariko helped him to win the war.

After the rebellion, Fujiwara no Michinori took control of the political situation. Nariko had long wished for her adopted son Prince Morihito's enthronement, and after a conference between her and Michinori in 1158 Prince Morihito ascended to the throne as Emperor Nijō. Unfortunately, this development led to the formation and opposition of sides centering on Michinori, Nijō, and Go-Shirakawa, which ultimately erupted in the Heiji Rebellion.

After this second rebellion, on December 22, 1160, Nariko died in her Shirakawa Oshikōji-dono (白河押小路殿) palace at the age of 44. According to her wishes, her remains were buried at Mount Kōya. At the time, women were not permitted to enter Mount Kōya, and so this caused something of a stir there.

== Issue ==
- Imperial Princess Eishi/Toshiko (叡子内親王), 1135–1148
- Imperial Princess Shōshi (暲子内親王), 1137–1211
- Imperial Prince Narihito (体仁親王), later Emperor Konoe, 1139–1155
- Imperial Princess Yoshiko/Shushi (姝子内親王), empress (chūgū to Emperor Nijō), 1141–1176

== Sources ==
Hashimoto, Yoshihiko (1996). "美福門院藤原得子" [Bifukumon-in Fujiwara no Nariko]. 平安の宮廷と貴族 [Nobles and Courts of the Heian Period] (in Japanese). Yoshikawa Kōbunkan (吉川弘文館).

Japanese royalty
Preceded by Fujiwara no Yasuko	Empress consort of Japan; 1142–1149	Succeeded by Fujiwara no Tashi
