= List of Nyoin =

The following is the list of Nyoin (女院).

- Higashi-sanjō In (東三条院): Fujiwara no Senshi (藤原詮子) - consort of Emperor En'yū
- Jōtō-mon In (上東門院): Fujiwara no Shōshi (藤原彰子) (988-1074) - consort of Emperor Ichijō
- Yōmei-mon In (陽明門院): Imperial Princess Teishi (禎子内親王) (1013-1094) - consort of Emperor Go-Suzaku
- Nijō In (二条院): Imperial Princess Shōshi (章子内親王) (1026-1105) - consort of Emperor Go-Reizei
- Ikuhō-mon In (郁芳門院): Imperial Princess Teishi/Yasuko (媞子内親王) (1076-1096) - mother-in-law(准母) of Emperor Horikawa
- Taiken-mon In (待賢門院): Fujiwara no Shōshi/Tamako (藤原璋子) (1101-1145) - consort of Emperor Toba
- Kaya no In (高陽院): Fujiwara no Yasuko (藤原泰子) (1095-1156) - consort of Emperor Toba
- Bifuku-mon In (美福門院): Fujiwara no Nariko (藤原得子) (1117-1160) - consort of Emperor Toba
- Kōka-mon In (皇嘉門院): Fujiwara no Kiyoko (藤原聖子) (1121-1182) - consort of Emperor Sutoku
- Jōsai-mon In (上西門院): Imperial Princess Tōshi/Muneko (統子内親王) - unmarried Empress
- Hachijō In (八条院): Imperial Princess Akiko (暲子内親王) (1137-1211), daughter of Emperor Toba
- Takamatsu In (高松院): Imperial Princess Yoshiko (姝子内親王) (1141-1176) - consort of Emperor Nijō
- Kujō In (九条院): Fujiwara no Teishi/Shimeko (藤原呈子) (1131-1176) - consort of Emperor Konoe
- Kenshun-mon In (建春門院): Taira no Shigeko (平滋子) (1142-1176) - consort of Emperor Go-Shirakawa (mother of Emperor Takakura)
- Kenrei-mon In (建礼門院): Taira no Tokushi/Noriko (平徳子) (1155-1214) - consort of Emperor Takakura (mother of Emperor Antoku)
- Inbu-mon In (殷富門院): Imperial Princess Sukeko (亮子内親王) (1147-1216) - mother-in-law(准母) of Emperor Antoku and Emperor Go-Toba
- Shichijō In (七条院): Fujiwara no Shokushi/Taneko (藤原殖子) (1157-1228) - consort of Emperor Takakura (mother of Emperor Go-Toba)
- Sen'yō-mon In (宣陽門院): Imperial Princess Akiko/Kinshi (覲子内親王) (1181-1252), daughter of Emperor Go-Shirakawa
- Gishū-mon In (宜秋門院): Fujiwara no Ninshi/Tōko (藤原任子) (1173-1240) - consort of Emperor Go-Toba
- Shōmei-mon In (承明門院): Minamoto no Zaishi/Ariko (源在子) (1171-1257) - consort of Emperor Go-Toba (mother of Emperor Tsuchimikado)
- Bōmon In (坊門院): Imperial Princess Noriko (範子内親王) (1177-1210) - mother-in-law(准母) of Emperor Tsuchimikado
- Shumei-mon In (修明門院): Fujiwara no Jūshi/Shigeko (藤原重子) (1182-1264) - consort of Emperor Go-Toba (mother of Emperor Juntoku)
- Shunka-mon In (春華門院): Imperial Princess Shōshi (昇子内親王) (1195-1211) - mother-in-law(准母) of Emperor Juntoku
- Immei-mon In (陰明門院): Fujiwara no Reishi (藤原麗子) (1185-1243) - consort of Emperor Tsuchimikado
- Kayō-mon In (嘉陽門院): Imperial Princess Reishi (礼子内親王) (1200-1272), daughter of Emperor Go-Toba
- Higashi-ichijō In (東一条院): Fujiwara no Ritsushi (藤原立子) (1192-1248) - consort of Emperor Juntoku
- Kita-shirakawa In (北白河院): Fujiwara no Nobuko/Chinshi (藤原陳子) (1173-1238) - consort of Go-Takakura In (mother of Emperor Go-Horikawa)
- Anka-mon In (安嘉門院): Imperial Princess Hōshi/Kuniko (邦子内親王) (1209-1283) - mother-in-law(准母) of Emperor Go-Horikawa
- Anki-mon In (安喜門院): Fujiwara no Ariko (藤原有子) (1207-1286) - consort of Emperor Go-Horikawa
- Takatsukasa In (鷹司院): Fujiwara no Chōshi (藤原長子) (1218-1275) - consort of Emperor Go-Horikawa
- Sōheki-mon In (藻璧門院): Fujiwara no Shunshi/Yoshiko (藤原竴子) (1209-1233) - consort of Emperor Go-Horikawa
- Meigi-mon In (明義門院): Imperial Princess Teishi (諦子内親王) (1217-1243), daughter of Emperor Juntoku
- Shikiken-mon In (式乾門院): Imperial Princess Rishi (利子内親王) (1197-1251) - mother-in-law(准母) of Emperor Shijō
- Sennin-mon In (宣仁門院): Fujiwara no Hiroko (藤原彦子) (1227-1262) - consort of Emperor Shijō
- Ōgimachi In (正親町院): Imperial Princess Akiko (覚子内親王) (1213-1285), daughter of Emperor Tsuchimikado
- Muromachi In (室町院): Imperial Princess Kishi (暉子内親王) (1228-1300), daughter of Emperor Go-Horikawa
- Ōmiya In (大宮院): Fujiwara no Kitsushi/Yoshiko (藤原姞子) (1225-1292) - consort of Emperor Go-Saga
- Senka-mon In (仙華門院): Imperial Princess Teruko (曦子内親王) (1224-1262) - unmarried Empress
- Eian-mon In (永安門院): Imperial Princess Jōshi (穠子内親王) (1216-1279), daughter of Emperor Juntoku
- Shinsen-mon In (神仙門院): Imperial Perincess Taishi (体子内親王) (1231-1302), daughter of Emperor Go-Horikawa
- Higashi-nijō In (東二条院): Fujiwara no Kōshi/Kimiko (藤原公子) (1232-1304) - consort of Emperor Go-Fukakusa
- Watoku-mon In (和徳門院): Imperial Princess Gishi (義子内親王) (1234-1290), daughter of Emperor Chūkyō
- Gekka-mon In (月華門院): Imperial Princess Sōshi (綜子内親王) (1247-1269), daughter of Emperor Go-Saga
- Imadegawa In (今出河院): Fujiwara no Kishi (藤原嬉子) (1252-1318) - consort of Emperor Kameyama
- Kyōgoku In (京極院): Fujiwara no Saneko (藤原佶子) (1245-1272) - consort of Emperor Kameyama
- Shin-Yōmei-mon In (新陽明門院): Fujiwara no Ishi (藤原位子) (1262-1296) - consort of Emperor Kameyama
- Ensei-mon In (延政門院): Imperial Princess Etsushi (悦子内親王) (1259-1332), daughter of Emperor Go-Saga
- Genki-mon In (玄輝門院): Fujiwara no Shizuko (藤原愔子) (1246-1329) - consort of Emperor Go-Fukakusa (mother of Emperor Fushimi)
- Gojō In (五条院): Imperial Princess Ekishi (懌子内親王) (1262-1294) - consort of Emperor Kameyama
- Yūgi-mon In (遊義門院): Imperial Princess Reishi (姈子内親王) (1270-1307) - unmarried Empress
- Eiyō-mon In (永陽門院): Imperial Princess Hisako (久子内親王) (1272-1346), daughter of Emperor Go-Fukakusa
- Shōkei-mon In (昭慶門院): Imperial Princess Kishi (憙子内親王) (1270-1324), daughter of Emperor Kameyama
- Eifuku-mon In (永福門院): Fujiwara no Shōshi (1271-1342) - consort of Emperor Fushimi
- Shōkin-mon In (昭訓門院): Fujiwara no Eishi (藤原瑛子) (1273-1336) - consort of Emperor Kameyama
- Eika-mon In (永嘉門院): Princess Zuishi (瑞子女王) (1272-1329) - consort of Emperor Go-Uda
- Yōtoku-mon In (陽徳門院): Imperial Princess Eishi (媖子内親王) (1228-1352), daughter of Emperor Go-Fukakusa
- Shōgi-mon In (章義門院): Imperial Princess Yoshi (誉子内親王) (?-1336), daughter of Emperor Fushimi
- Seika-mon In (西華門院): Minamoto no Motoko (源基子) (1269-1355) - consort of Emperor Go-Uda (mother of Emperor Go-Nijō)
- Kōgi-mon In (広義門院): Fujiwara no Yasuko/Neishi (藤原寧子) (1292-1357) - consort of Emperor Go-Fushimi
- Shōzen-mon In (章善門院): Imperial Princess Eishi (永子内親王) (?-1338), daughter of Emperor Go-Fukakusa
- Sakuhei-mon In (朔平門院): Imperial Princess Jushi (璹子内親王) (1287-1310), daughter of Emperor Fushimi
- Chōraku-mon In (長楽門院): Fujiwara no Kinshi (藤原忻子) (1283-1352) - consort of Emperor Go-Nijō
- Enmei-mon In (延明門院): Imperial Princess Nobuko (延子内親王) (1291-?), daughter of Emperor Fushimi
- Danten-mon In (談天門院): Fujiwara no Tadako (藤原忠子) (1268-1319) - consort of Emperor Go-Uda (mother of Emperor Go-Daigo)
- Tacchi-mon In (達智門院): Imperial Princess Shōshi (奬子内親王) (1286-1348) - unmarried Empress
- Banshū-mon In (万秋門院): Fujiwara no Tamako (藤原頊子) (1268-1336) - consort of Emperor Go-Nijō
- Jusei-mon In (寿成門院): Imperial Princess Sōshi (1302-1362), daughter of Emperor Go-Nijō
- Kenshin-mon In (顕親門院): Fujiwara no Kishi/Sueko (藤原季子) (1265-1336) - consort of Emperor Fushimi (mother of Emperor Hanazono)
- Sumei-mon In (崇明門院): Imperial Princess Baishi (禖子内親王) (ca.1300-?) - consort of Crown Prince Kuninaga (邦良親王)
- Reisei-mon In (礼成門院): Fujiwara no Kishi (藤原禧子) (1303-1333) - consort of Emperor Go-Daigo (back to Empress by Emperor Go-Daigo's decree) = Go-Kyōgoku In (後京極院)
- Go-Kyōgoku In (後京極院): Fujiwara no Kishi (藤原禧子) (1303-1333) - consort of Emperor Go-Daigo (posthumous honor)
- Sensei-mon In (宣政門院): Imperial Princess Kanshi (懽子内親王) (1315-1362) - consort of Emperor Kōgon
- Shōtoku-mon In (章徳門院): Imperial Princess Koshi (璜子内親王) (?-?), daughter of Emperor Go-Fushimi
- Shin-Muromachi In (新室町院): Imperial Princess Junshi (珣子内親王) (1311-1337) - consort of Emperor Go-Daigo
- Kian-mon In (徽安門院): Imperial Princess Jushi (寿子内親王) (1318-1358) - consort of Emperor Kōgon
- Senko-mon In (宣光門院): Fujiwara no Jitsushi (藤原実子) (1297-1360) - consort of Emperor Hanazono
- Shin-Taiken-mon In (新待賢門院): Fujiwara no Renshi (藤原廉子) (1301-1359) - consort of Emperor Go-Daigo (mother of Emperor Go-Murakami)
- Yōroku-mon In (陽禄門院): Fujiwara no Hideko (藤原秀子) (1311-1352) - consort of Emperor Kōgon (mother of Emperor Sukō and Emperor Go-Kōgon)
- Kaki-mon In (嘉喜門院): Fujiwara no Katsuko (藤原勝子) (?-?) - consort of Emperor Go-Murakami (mother of Emperor Chōkei and Emperor Go-Kameyama)
- Shin-Sen'yō-mon In (新宣陽門院): Imperial Princess Noriko (憲子内親王) (1343-1391), daughter of Emperor Go-Murakami
- Sūken-mon In (崇賢門院): Ki no Nakako (紀仲子) - consort of Emperor Go-Kōgon (mother of Emperor Go-En'yū)
- Tsūyō-mon In (通陽門院): Fujiwara no Genshi/Takako (藤原厳子) - consort of Emperor Go-En'yū (mother of Emperor Go-Komatsu)
- Kitayama In (北山院): Fujiwara no Yasuko (藤原康子) (1369-1419) - wife of Ashikaga Yoshimitsu (mother-in-law(准母) of Emperor Go-Komatsu)
- Kōhan-mon In (光範門院): Fujiwara no Sukeko (藤原資子) (1384-1440) - consort of Emperor Go-Komatsu (mother of Emperor Shōkō)
- Fusei-mon In (敷政門院): Minamoto no Yukiko (源幸子) (1390-1448) - consort of Go-Sukō In (mother of Emperor Go-Hanazono)
- Karaku-mon In (嘉楽門院): Fujiwara no Nobuko (藤原信子) (1411-1488) - consort of Emperor Go-Hanazono (mother of Emperor Go-Tsuchimikado)
- Buraku-mon In (豊楽門院): Fujiwara no Fujiko (藤原藤子) (1464-1535) - consort of Emperor Go-Kashiwabara (mother of Emperor Go-Nara)
- Kittoku-mon In (吉徳門院): Fujiwara no Eishi (藤原栄子) (?-1522) - consort of Emperor Go-Nara (mother of Emperor Ōgimachi)
- Shin-Jōtō-mon In (新上東門院): Fujiwara no Haruko (藤原晴子) (1553-1620) - consort of Yōkō In (mother of Emperor Go-Yōzei)
- Chūka-mon In (中和門院): Fujiwara no Sakiko (藤原前子) (1575-1630) - consort of Emperor Go-Yōzei (mother of Emperor Go-Mizunoo)
- Tōfuku-mon In (東福門院): Minamoto no Masako (源和子) (1607-1678) - consort of Emperor Go-Mizunoo (mother of Empress Meishō)
- Mibu In (壬生院): Fujiwara no Mitsuko (藤原光子) (1602-1656) - consort of Emperor Go-Mizunoo (mother of Emperor Go-Kōmyō)
- Shin-Kogi-mon In (新広義門院): Fujiwara no Kuniko (藤原国子) (1624-1677) - consort of Emperor Go-Mizunoo (mother of Emperor Reigen)
- Ōshun-mon In (逢春門院): Fujiwara no Takako (藤原隆子) (1604-1685) - consort of Emperor Go-Mizunoo mother of Emperor Gosai)
- Shin-Jōsai-mon In (新上西門院): Fujiwara no Fusako (藤原房子) (1653-1712) - consort of Emperor Reigen
- Shōshū-mon In (承秋門院): Princess Yukiko (幸子女王) (1681-1720) - consort of Emperor Higashiyama
- Shin-Sūken-mon In (新崇賢門院): Fujiwara no Yoshiko (藤原賀子) (1675-1710) - consort of Emperor Higashiyama (mother of Emperor Nakamikado)
- Keihō-mon In (敬法門院): Fujiwara no Muneko (藤原宗子) (1657-1732) - consort of Emperor Reigen (mother of Emperor Higashiyama)
- Shin-Chūka-mon In (新中和門院): Fujiwara no Hisako (藤原尚子) (1702-1720) - consort of Emperor Nakamikado (mother of Emperor Sakuramachi)
- Reisei-mon In (礼成門院): Imperial Princess Takako (孝子内親王) (1650-1725), daughter of Emperor Go-Kōmyō
- Seiki-mon In (青綺門院): Fujiwara no Ieko (藤原舎子) (1716-1790) - consort of Emperor Sakuramachi (mother of Empress Go-Sakuramachi)
- Kaimei-mon In (開明門院): Nijō Ieko (藤原定子) (1717-1789) - consort of Emperor Sakuramachi (mother of Emperor Momozono)
- Kyōrei-mon In (恭礼門院): Fujiwara no Tomiko (藤原富子) (1743-1795) - consort of Emperor Momozono (mother of Emperor Go-Momozono)
- Seika-mon In (盛化門院): Fujiwara no Koreko (藤原維子) (1759-1783) - consort of Emperor Go-Momozono
- Shin-Koka-mon In (新皇嘉門院): Fujiwara no Tsunako (藤原繋子) (1798-1823) - consort of Emperor Ninkō (posthumous honor)
- Shin-Seiwa In (新清和院): Imperial Princess Yoshiko (欣子内親王) (1779-1846) - consort of Emperor Kōkaku
- Higashi-kyogoku In (東京極院): Fujiwara no Tadako (藤原婧子) (1780-1843) - consort of Emperor Kōkaku (mother of Emperor Ninkō)
- Shin-Sakuhei-mon In (新朔平門院): Fujiwara no Yasuko (藤原祺子) (1811-1847) - consort of Emperor Ninkō
- Shin-Taiken-mon In (新待賢門院): Fujiwara no Naoko (藤原雅子) (1803-1856) - consort of Emperor Ninkō (mother of Emperor Kōmei)
