= Empress of Japan =

Wife of the Emperor of Japan

- 皇后
- Imperial
- Imperial standard

Incumbent
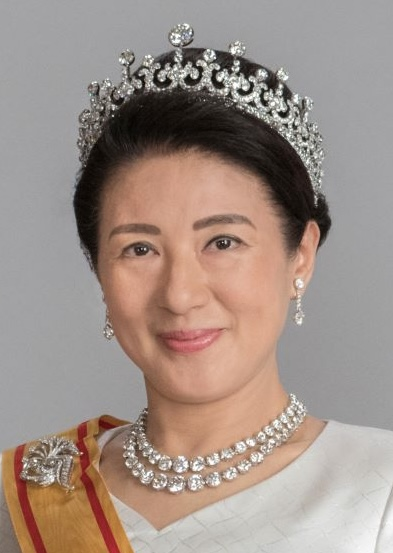
- Masako since 1 May 2019

Details
- Style: Her Majesty (Note: 陛下 (Heika)) (Note: The empress does not generally use the style "Imperial Majesty" because in modern Japanese protocol, the preferred title for the empress is simply "Majesty". The Japanese term "Kōgō Heika" (皇后陛下) roughly translates into English as "Her Majesty the Empress". This style of address is prescribed by law and used by the Imperial Household Agency.)
- Residences: Tokyo Imperial Palace (official residence)
- Website: www.kunaicho.go.jp

The empress of Japan (Note: Japanese: 皇后, romanized: Kōgō) is the title given to the wife of the Emperor of Japan or a female ruler in her own right. The current empress consort is Empress Masako, who ascended the throne with her husband Emperor Naruhito on 1 May 2019.

== Empress regnant ==
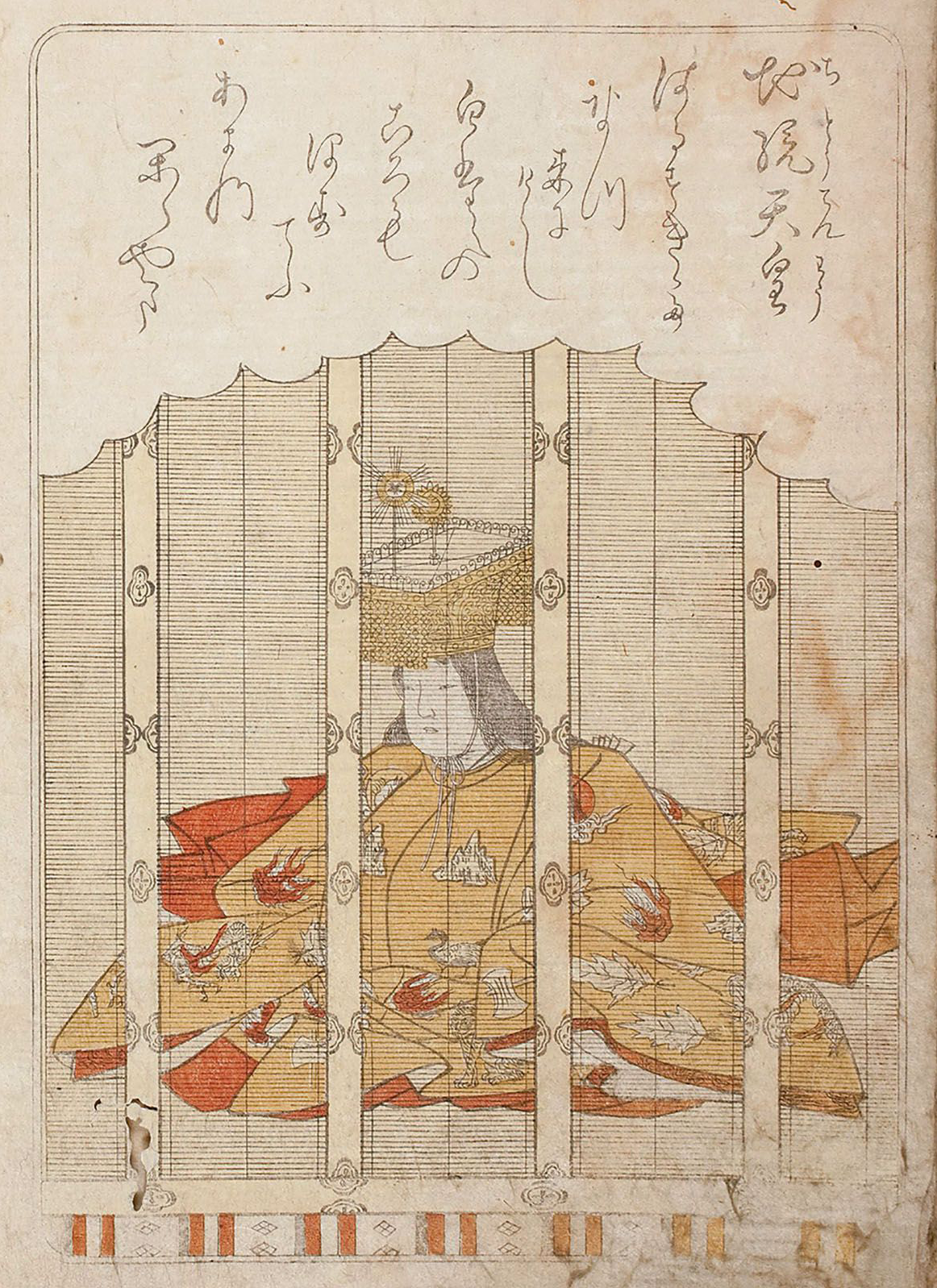
Empress Jitō (645–703) by Katsukawa Shunsho, 18th century

=== Titles ===
- Josei Tennō (女性天皇, lit. "female heavenly emperor") or Jotei (女帝, lit. "female emperor") – Because there is no feminine equivalent to king and emperor in East Asian languages, different titles are used for female monarchs and female consorts. Josei Tennō refers only to an empress regnant of Japan, and Jotei refers to an empress regnant of any countries. (Note: East Asian royal titles are all related. For example, an empress regnant is called nǚhuáng in Chinese, yeoje in Korean, Nữ hoàng in Vietnamese, and jotei in Japanese, but these are all just their respective pronunciations of the Chinese character 女皇帝 ("female emperor") or its abbreviation. But, the Japanese call only their emperors/empresses-regnant with the special title tennō/josei tennō.)
- Tennō (天皇, lit. "heavenly emperor") or Kōtei (皇帝, lit. "emperor") – Unlike European languages, in East Asia, the titles of female monarchs can also be abbreviated as "king" or "emperor", much like their male counterparts. However, to avoid confusion with male monarchs, they are usually referred to as "female king" or "female emperor".

=== List of empresses regnant ===
There were eight female imperial reigns (six empresses regnant including two who reigned twice) in Japan's early history between 593 and 770, and two more in the early modern period (Edo period). Although there were eight reigning empresses, with only one exception their successors were selected from amongst the males of the paternal Imperial bloodline. After many centuries, female reigns came to be officially prohibited only when the Imperial Household Law was issued in 1889 alongside the new Meiji Constitution.

The eight historical empresses regnant are:

- Nukatabe, Empress Suiko (推古天皇 Suiko Tennō) was the 33rd empress of Japan from 593 until 628, according to the traditional order of succession, and the first historically attested woman to hold this position. She was the granddaughter of Tashiraga of Yamato, herself sister of the childless Emperor Buretsu, transferring some legitimacy in succession to the throne of Yamato to her husband Emperor Keitai. Tashiraga's mother had been Kasuga of Yamato, sister of the childless Emperor Seinei, whose own marriage with the future Emperor Ninken had a similar effect a generation earlier. According to legends, these ladies descended from the legendary Empress Jingū, who had been ruler (since Meiji-era rewrites of history, Regent) of Yamato for decades at some time in the past, probably in the mid-4th century (if she really existed), and who herself descended, according to legends, from Amaterasu omikami, the Sun Goddess of the Japanese pantheon.
- Takara, Empress Kōgyoku (皇極天皇 Kōgyoku Tennō), also Empress Saimei (斉明天皇 Saimei Tennō) was the 35th and 37th empress of Japan, initially from February 18, 642, to July 12, 645, ascending upon the death of her uncle Emperor Jomei (who had also been her second husband). When she abdicated, her own younger brother succeeded her. However, upon the death of the said younger brother, she reascended the throne as Empress Saimei on February 14, 655, and ruled until her death on August 24, 661. She was succeeded by her and Emperor Jomei's son, Naka no Ōe, as Emperor Tenji.
- Unonosasara, Empress Jitō (持統天皇 Jitō Tennō) was the 41st imperial ruler of Japan, and ruled from 686 until 697. The previous emperor was her uncle and husband, Emperor Tenmu, and she later abdicated the throne to her grandson Emperor Monmu.
- Ahe, Empress Genmei (also Empress Genmyō; 元明天皇 Genmei Tennō) was the 43rd imperial ruler of Japan ruling 707–715 (died December 7, 721). She was Empress Jitō's younger half-sister and the mother of Emperor Monmu, who died at a young age.
- Hitaka, Empress Genshō (元正天皇 Genshō Tennō) was the 44th monarch of Japan (715–724). She succeeded after her mother Empress Genmei and later abdicated to her nephew Emperor Shōmu, son of Emperor Monmu.
- Abe, Empress Kōken (孝謙天皇 Kōken Tennō) also Empress Shōtoku (称徳天皇 Shōtoku Tennō) was the 46th imperial ruler of Japan from 749 to 758, and the 48th from 764 to 770. Her posthumous name for her second reign (764–770) was Empress Shōtoku. She never married and her ex-crown prince was Prince Bunado, her first cousin twice removed, but after her death, another of her cousins ascended the throne as Emperor Kanmu, who was also her brother-in-law.
- Okiko, Empress Meishō (明正天皇 Meishō Tennō) was the 109th empress of Japan, reigning from December 22, 1629, to November 14, 1643. She ascended upon the abdication of her father, being the eldest surviving child of her parents (the empress, Tokugawa Masako, had only four daughters without surviving sons), holding priority over her younger half-brothers.
- Toshiko, Empress Go-Sakuramachi (後桜町天皇 Go-Sakuramachi Tennō) was the 117th empress of Japan, and ruled from September 15, 1762, to January 9, 1771. She abdicated in favor of her young nephew. Surviving over forty years, the retired Empress held all those decades the position of Dajo Tenno, and acted as sort of guardian of subsequent emperors.

Other than the eight historical empresses regnant, two additional empress are traditionally believed to have reigned, but historical evidence for their reigns is scant and they are not counted among the officially numbered Emperors/Empresses regnant:

- Empress Jingū r. 206–269 (empress consort of Emperor Chūai)—not counted among the officially numbered Emperors
- Princess Iitoyo: Imperial princess and possibly empress regnant. She was baptized as Empress Tsunuzashi in the list of emperors of Japan.

Under Shinto religious influence, the goddess Amaterasu, who is of the highest rank in the kami system, might suggest that Japan's first rulers were women. According to the Kojiki and Nihon Shoki chronicles in Japanese mythology, the Emperors of Japan are considered to be direct descendants of Amaterasu.

== Empress consort ==
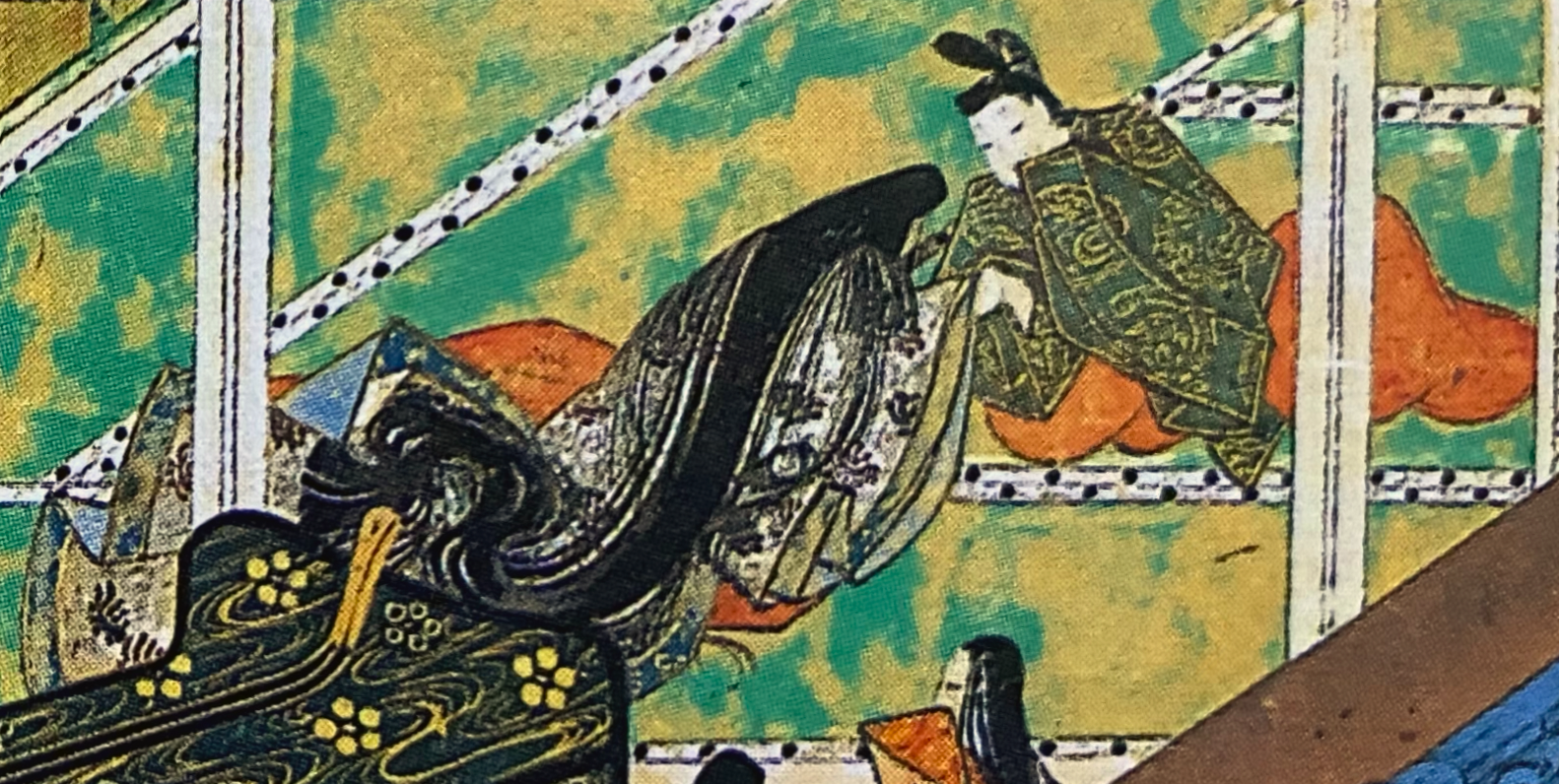
Empress Kishi (c.1303–1333) and Emperor Go-Daigo (1288–1339) from Taiheiki Emaki (c.17th century). Owned by Saitama Prefectural Museum of History and Folklore.

=== Titles ===
- Kōgō (皇后) – It is the title of a non-reigning empress consort. (Note: East Asian royal titles are all related. For example, an empress consort is called huánghòu in Chinese, hwanghu in Korean, hoàng hậu in Vietnamese, and kōgō in Japanese, but these are all just their respective pronunciations of the Chinese character 皇后 ("emperor's consort").) The title, still in use, is generally conferred on an emperor's wife who had given birth to the heir to the throne. The title was first awarded posthumously in 806 to the late mother of Emperor Heizei. In ancient Japan, most of the empresses consort were princesses, except for Iwa no hime (empress consort of Nintoku). After Empress Kōmyō (empress consort of Shōmu), daughters of the Fujiwara clan or other clans could become empresses consort.
- Kōtaigō (皇太后) – Empress Mother/Empress Dowager
- Tai-Kōtaigō (太皇太后) – Grand Empress Mother/Grand Empress Dowager
- Chūgū (中宮) – It was a term that evolved during the Heian period; and it came to be understood as the title of the empress. For a time, Chūgū replaced Kōgō; and then the titles became interchangeable. The numbers of Kōgō varied, but there was only one Chūgū at a time. Originally, Chūgū (中宮) referred to the palace of the Kōgō (皇后), Kōtaigō (皇太后), or Tai-Kōtaigō (太皇太后). Until the mid-Heian Period, the emperor had only one empress consort, and the empress consort was also called Chūgū. From the time of Emperor Ichijō, when emperors had two empresses consort, one of them came to be called Kōgō and another one was called Chūgū.
- Junbo-Ritsugō (准母立后) – It means individuals elevated to the rank of empress due to their position as honorary mother of the emperor. After maiden Princess Yasuko became empress as the honorary or adoptive mother of Emperor Horikawa, maiden princesses could also become empress.
- Zōkō (贈后) – It means individuals that were given the title of empress posthumously.
- Jōkōgō (上皇后) – Empress Emerita
- Kōi (后位) – was an ancient title for empress consort or empress dowager. The definitions were laid down in the Ritsuryō code. Use during the Heian period is exemplified for example for the character Kiritsubo Consort (桐壺更衣, Kiritsubo no Kōi) in The Tale of Genji. The title Kōi later gave way for Kōgō (皇后) for the empress consort to avoid confusion.

=== List of empresses consort ===
| Portrait | Name | Spouse | Tenure | Life details |
|---|---|---|---|---|
| | Himetataraisuzu-hime 媛蹈鞴五十鈴媛 | Emperor Jimmu | 660–581 BC (81 years) | Daughter of Kotoshironushi. Married Emperor Jimmu in 681 BC. Gave birth to Emperor Suizei and two other children. Empress dowager from 581 BC. |
| | Isuzuyori-hime 五十鈴依媛命 | Emperor Suizei | 580–548 BC (32 years) | Daughter of Kotoshironushi. Gave birth to Emperor Annei. Empress dowager from 548 BC. |
| | Nunasokonakatsu-hime 渟名底仲媛命 | Emperor Annei | 546–510 BC (36 years) | Daughter of Prince Kamo; niece of Himetataraisuzu-hime and Isuzuyori-hime. Gave birth to Emperor Itoku and two other children. Empress dowager from 510 BC. |
| | Amonotoyototsu-hime 天豊津媛命 | Emperor Itoku | 509–475 BC (34 years) | Daughter of Prince Okisomimi; granddaughter of Emperor Annei and Nunasokonakatsu-hime. Gave birth to Emperor Kōshō and one other child. Empress dowager from 475 BC. |
| | Yosotarashi-hime 世襲足媛 | Emperor Kōshō | 447–392 BC (55 years) | Daughter of Ame no Oshio no Mikoto. Gave birth to Emperor Kōan and one other child. Empress dowager from 392 BC. |
| | Oshihime 押媛 | Emperor Kōan | 367–290 BC (77 years) | Daughter of Prince Ametarashihikokunioshihito; granddaughter of Emperor Kōshō and Yosotarashi-hime. Gave birth to Emperor Kōrei and one other child. Empress dowager from 290 BC. |
| | Kuwashi-hime 細媛命 | Emperor Kōrei | 289–214 BC (74 years) | Daughter of Shiki no Agatanushi Oome. Gave birth to Emperor Kōgen. Empress dowager from 214 BC. |
| | Utsushikome 欝色謎命 | Emperor Kōgen | 208–157 BC (50 years) | Daughter of Oyakuchisukune. Gave birth to Emperor Kaika and three other children. Empress dowager from 157 BC. |
| | Ikagashikome 伊香色謎命 | Emperor Kaika | 152–97 BC (75 years) | Daughter of Ōhesoki. Was a concubine of Emperor Kōgen, with whom she had one child. Later married Emperor Kaika and gave birth to Emperor Sujin and one other child. Empress dowager from 97 BC. |
| | Mimaki-hime 御間城姫 | Emperor Sujin | 97–29 BC (68 years) | Daughter of Prince Ōhiko; granddaughter of Emperor Kōgen and Utsushikome. Gave birth to Emperor Suinin and five other children. Empress dowager from 29 BC. |
| | Saho-hime 狭穂姫命 | Emperor Suinin | 28–25 BC (3 years) | died 25 BC Daughter of Prince Hikoimasu; granddaughter of Emperor Kaika. Gave birth to one child. Died during the rebellion of her older brother, Sahohiko. |
| | Hibasu-hime 日葉酢媛命 | Emperor Suinin | 15 BC–AD 3 (18 years) | died AD 3 Daughter of Prince Tanba-no-Michinoushi; great-granddaughter of Emperor Kaika; niece of Saho-hime. Gave birth to Emperor Keikō and four other children. |
| | Harima no Inabi no Ōiratsume 播磨稲日大郎姫 | Emperor Keikō | 72–122 (40 years) | died 122 Daughter of Prince Wakatakehiko; granddaughter of Emperor Kōrei. Gave birth to four children. |
| | Yasakairi-hime 八坂入媛命 | Emperor Keikō | 122–132 (10 years) | Daughter of Prince Yasakairihiko; granddaughter of Emperor Sujin; half-cousin of Emperor Keikō. Gave birth to Emperor Seimu and 11 other children. Empress dowager from 132. |
| | Okinagatarashi-hime 気長足姫尊 | Emperor Chūai | 193–201 (8 years) | 169–269 (100 years) Daughter of Okinaganosukune; great-great-great-granddaughter of Emperor Kaika. Gave birth to Emperor Ōjin and served as his regent from 201 until 269. Empress dowager from 201. |
| | Nakatsu-hime 仲姫命 | Emperor Ōjin | 271–313 (41 years) | Daughter of Homudamawaka. Gave birth to Emperor Nintoku and two other children. Empress Dowager from 313. |
| | Princess Iwa 磐之媛命 | Emperor Nintoku | 314–347 (33 years) | died 347 Daughter of Katsuragi no Sotsuhiko; great-great-great-granddaughter of Emperor Kōgen. Poet. Gave birth to Emperor Richū, Emperor Hanzei, Emperor Ingyō and one other child. |
| | Princess Yata 八田皇女 | Emperor Nintoku | appointed 350 | Daughter of Emperor Ōjin. |
| | Princess Kusakanohatabino 草香幡梭皇女 | Emperor Richū | appointed 405 | Daughter of Emperor Ōjin. Gave birth to Princess Nakashi. |
| | Oshisaka no Ōnakatsuhime 忍坂大中姫 | Emperor Ingyō | 413–453 (40 years) | Daughter of Prince Wakanuke no Futamata; granddaughter of Emperor Ōjin. Gave birth to Emperor Ankō, Emperor Yūryaku and seven other children. Empress dowager from 453. |
| | Princess Nakashi 中磯皇女 | Emperor Ankō | appointed 455 | Daughter of Emperor Richū and Kusakanohatabino-hime; niece of Emperor Ankō. Previously married to Prince Ōkusaka, son of Emperor Nintoku, and had one child with him. Became a concubine of Emperor Ankō in 454. |
| | Kusaka no Hatabi no hime 草香幡梭姫皇女 | Emperor Yūryaku | appointed 457 | Daughter of Emperor Nintoku. |
| | Princess Naniwa no Ono 難波小野王 | Emperor Kenzō | 485–489 (4 years) | died 489 In the Nihon Shoki: daughter of Prince Oka-no-Wakugo; great-granddaughter of Emperor Ingyō. In the Kojiki: daughter of Prince Iwaki; granddaughter of Emperor Yūryaku. Committed suicide due to fears over disrespecting Emperor Ninken when he was crown prince. |
| | Princess Kasuga no Ōiratsume 春日大娘皇女 | Emperor Ninken | appointed 488 | Daughter of Emperor Yuryaku. Gave birth to Emperor Buretsu, Princess Tashiraka, Princess Tachibana no Nakatsu and six other children. |
| | Kasuga no Iratsume 春日娘子 | Emperor Buretsu | appointed 499 | Unknown parents. |
| | Princess Tashiraka 手白香皇女 | Emperor Keitai | appointed 507 | born 489 Daughter of Emperor Ninken and Princess Kasuga no Ōiratsume. Gave birth to one child. |
| | Princess Kasuga no Yamada 春日山田皇女 | Emperor Ankan | appointed 534 | Daughter of Emperor Ninken. Married Emperor Ankan in 513. |
| | Princess Tachibana no Nakatsu 橘仲皇女 | Emperor Senka | 536–539 (3 years) | Daughter of Emperor Ninken and Princess Kasuga no Ōiratsume. Gave birth to five children. Empress dowager from 539. |
| | Princess Ishi-hime 石姫皇女 | Emperor Kinmei | 540–572 (32 years) | Daughter of Emperor Senka and Princess Tachibana no Nakatsu. Gave birth to Emperor Bidatsu and two other children. Empress dowager from 572. |
| | Hirohime 広姫 | Emperor Bidatsu | 575 (10 months) | died 575 Daughter of Prince Okinaga-no-Mate; great-great-granddaughter of Emperor Ōjin. Gave birth to three children. |
| | Princess Nukatabe 額田部皇女 | Emperor Bidatsu | 576–585 (9 years) | 554–628 (74 years) Daughter of Emperor Kinmei. Gave birth to eight children. Empress regnant from 592. |
| | Princess Hashihito no Anahobe 穴穂部間人皇女 | Emperor Yōmei | 586–587 (1 year) | 560–621 (61 years) Daughter of Emperor Kinmei. Married to Emperor Yōmei in 564. Gave birth to four children. |
| | Princess Takara 宝皇女 | Emperor Jomei | 630–641 (11 years) | 594–661 (67 years) Daughter of Prince Chinu; great-granddaughter of Emperor Bidatsu. Gave birth to Emperor Tenji, Emperor Kōtoku and one other child. Empress regnant from 642 until 645 and from 655 until 661. |
| | Princess Hashihito 間人皇女 | Emperor Kōtoku | appointed 645 | died 665 Daughter of Emperor Jomei and Princess Takara. |
| | Yamato Hime no Ōkimi 倭姫王 | Emperor Tenji | appointed 668 | Daughter of Prince Furuhito no Ōe; granddaughter of Emperor Jomei. Poet. Gave birth to Emperor Tenmu. |
| | Princess Unonosarara 鸕野讃良皇女 | Emperor Tenmu | 673–686 (13 years) | 645–703 (57–58 years) Daughter of Emperor Tenji. Gave birth to one child. Empress regnant from 686 until 697. |
| | Fujiwara Asukabehime 藤原安宿媛 | Emperor Shōmu | 729–749 (9 years) | 701–760 (58–59 years) Daughter of Fujiwara no Fuhito. Gave birth to Empress Kōken and one other child. Empress dowager from 749. |
| | Princess Inoe 井上内親王 | Emperor Kōnin | 770–772 (2 years) | 717–775 (57–58 years) Daughter of Emperor Shōmu; half-sister of Empress Kōken. Gave birth to Sakahito, as well as to Osabe who was named crown prince. Deposed in 772 after being accused of using curses and black magic to promote Osabe to the throne. |
| | Fujiwara no Otomuro 藤原乙牟漏 | Emperor Kanmu | 783–790 (6 years) | 760–790 (29–30 years) Daughter of Fujiwara no Yoshitsugu. Gave birth to Emperor Heizei, Emperor Saga and Princess Koshi. Posthumously appointed empress dowager in 806. |
| | Fujiwara no Tarashiko 藤原帯子 | Emperor Heizei | posthumously appointed in 806 | died 794 Daughter of Fujiwara no Momokawa. Married Emperor Heizei before his accession to the throne. |
| | Tachibana no Kachiko 橘嘉智子 | Emperor Saga | 815–823 (7 years) | 786–850 (63–64 years) Daughter of Tachibana no Kiyotomo. Married Emperor Saga in 809. Gave birth to Emperor Ninmyō, Princess Seishi and five other children. Empress dowager from 823 until 833. Grand empress dowager from 833. |
| | Princess Koshi 高志内親王 | Emperor Junna | posthumously appointed in 823 | 789–809 (19–20 years) Daughter of Emperor Kanmu and Fujiwara no Otomuro. Married Emperor Junna in 804. Gave birth to four children. |
| | Princess Seishi 正子内親王 | Emperor Junna | 827–833 (6 years) | 810–879 (68–69 years) Daughter of Emperor Saga and Tachibana no Kachiko. Gave birth to three children. Empress dowager from 833 until 854. Grand empress dowager from 854. |
| | Fujiwara no Onshi 藤原穏子 | Emperor Daigo | 923–931 (7 years) | 885–954 (68–69 years) Daughter of Fujiwara no Mototsune. Gave birth to Emperor Suzaku, Emperor Murakami and two other children. Empress dowager from 931 until 946. Grand empress dowager from 946. |
| | Fujiwara no Anshi 藤原安子 | Emperor Murakami | 958–964 (5 years) | 927–964 (68–69 years) Daughter of Fujiwara no Morosuke. Gave birth to Emperor Reizei, Emperor En'yu and seven other children. |
| | Princess Masako 昌子内親王 | Emperor Reizei | 967–973 (5 years) | 950–1000 (49–50 years) Daughter of Emperor Suzaku. Adopted one child. Empress dowager from 973 until 986. Grand empress dowager from 986. |
| | Fujiwara no Koshi 藤原媓子 | Emperor En'yū | 973–979 (5 years) | 947–979 (31–32 years) Daughter of Fujiwara no Kanemichi. |
| | Fujiwara no Junshi 藤原遵子 | Emperor En'yū | 982–997 (15 years) | 957–1017 (59–60 years) Daughter of Fujiwara no Yoritada. Empress dowager from 1000 until 1012. Grand empress dowager from 1012. |
| | Fujiwara no Teishi 藤原定子 | Emperor Ichijō | 990–1001 (10 years) | 977–1001 (23–24 years) Daughter of Fujiwara no Michitaka. Gave birth to three children. |
| | Fujiwara no Shōshi 藤原彰子 | Emperor Ichijō | 1000–1012 (12 years) | 988–1074 (86 years) Daughter of Fujiwara no Michinaga. Gave birth to Emperor Go-Ichijō and Emperor Go-Suzaku. Empress dowager from 1012 to 1018. Grand empress dowager from 1018. |
| | Fujiwara no Seishi 藤原娍子 | Emperor Sanjō | 1012–1016 (4 years) | 972–1025 (52–53 years) Daughter of Fujiwara no Naritoki. Gave birth to six children. |
| | Fujiwara no Kenshi 藤原妍子 | Emperor Sanjō | 1012–1018 (6 years) | 994–1027 (32–33 years) Daughter of Fujiwara no Michinaga. Gave birth to Princess Teishi. Empress dowager from 1018. |
| | Fujiwara no Ishi 藤原威子 | Emperor Go-Ichijō | 1018–1036 (18 years) | 1000–1036 (36 years) Daughter of Fujiwara no Michinaga. Gave birth to Princess Shōshi (1027–1105) and Princess Kaoruko. |
| | Princess Teishi 禎子内親王 | Emperor Go-Suzaku | 1037–1051 (14 years) | 1013–1094 (80 years) Daughter of Emperor Sanjō and Fujiwara no Kenshi (994–1027). Gave birth to Emperor Go-Sanjō and two other children. Empress dowager from 1051 until 1068. Grand empress dowager from 1068. |
| | Fujiwara no Genshi 藤原嫄子 | Emperor Go-Suzaku | 1037–1039 (2 years) | 1016–1039 (23 years) Daughter of Prince Atsuyasu; granddaughter of Emperor Ichijō; adopted daughter of Fujiwara no Yorimichi. Gave birth to two children. |
| | Princess Shōshi 章子内親王 | Emperor Go-Reizei | 1046–1068 (22 years) | 1027–1105 (77–78 years) Daughter of Emperor Go-Ichijō and Fujiwara no Ishi. Empress dowager from 1068 until 1069. Grand empress dowager from 1069. |
| | Fujiwara no Hiroko 藤原寛子 | Emperor Go-Reizei | 1051–1069 (18 years) | 1036–1127 (90–91 years) Daughter of Fujiwara no Yorimichi. Empress dowager from 1069 until 1074. Grand empress dowager from 1074. |
| | Fujiwara no Kanshi 藤原歓子 | Emperor Go-Reizei | 1068–1074 (6 years) | 1021–1102 (80–81 years) Daughter of Fujiwara no Norimichi. Gave birth to one child. Empress dowager from 1074. |
| | Princess Kaoruko 馨子内親王 | Emperor Go-Sanjō | 1069–1093 (24 years) | 1029–1093 (63–64 years) Daughter of Emperor Go-Ichijō. Married Emperor Go-Sanjō in 1051. |
| | Fujiwara no Kenshi 藤原賢子 | Emperor Shirakawa | 1074–1084 (10 years) | 1057–1084 (26–27 years) Daughter of Minamoto Akifusa; adopted daughter of Fujiwara no Morozane. Gave birth to Emperor Horikawa and four other children. |
| | Princess Yasuko 媞子内親王 | Honorary; adoptive mother of Emperor Horikawa | 1091–1093 (2 years) | 1076–1096 (19–20 years) Daughter of Emperor Shirakawa and Fujiwara no Kenshi (1057–1084); sister of Emperor Horikawa. |
| | Princess Tokushi 篤子内親王 | Emperor Horikawa | 1093–1107 (14 years) | 1060–1114 (53–54 years) Daughter of Emperor Go-Sanjō and Princess Kaoruko. |
| | Princess Reishi 令子内親王 | Honorary; adoptive mother of Emperor Toba | 1108–1134 (26 years) | 1078–1144 (65–66 years) Daughter of Emperor Shirakawa and Fujiwara no Kenshi (1057–1084); aunt of Emperor Toba. |
| | Fujiwara no Tamako 藤原璋子 | Emperor Toba | 1118–1124 (6 years) | 1101–1145 (43–44 years) Daughter of Fujiwara no Kinzane. Raised by Emperor Shirakawa after losing her father when she was seven years old. Gave birth to Emperor Sutoku, Emperor Go-Shirakawa, Princess Muneko and four other children. |
| | Fujiwara no Kiyoko 藤原聖子 | Emperor Sutoku | 1130–1142 (12 years) | 1122–1182 (59–60 years) Daughter of Fujiwara no Tadamichi. Empress dowager from 1142. |
| | Fujiwara no Yasuko 藤原泰子 | Emperor Toba | 1134–1139 (5 years) | 1095–1156 (60–61 years) Daughter of Fujiwara no Tadazane. |
| | Fujiwara no Nariko 藤原得子 | Emperor Toba | 1142–1149 (7 years) | 1117–1160 (42–43 years) Daughter of Fujiwara no Nagazane. Gave birth to Emperor Konoe, Princess Yoshiko (1141–1176) and two other children. |
| | Fujiwara no Tashi 藤原多子 | Emperor Konoe | 1150–1156 (6 years) | 1140–1202 (61–62 years) Daughter of Tokudaiji Kinyoshi; adopted daughter of Fujiwara no Yorinaga. Empress dowager from 1156. Grand empress dowager from 1158. Consort of Emperor Nijō from 1160 until 1165. Only empress to become the consort of two emperors. |
| | Fujiwara no Teishi 藤原呈子 | Emperor Konoe | 1150–1158 (7 years) | 1131–1176 (44–45 years) Daughter of Fujiwara no Koremichi; adopted daughter of Fujiwara no Tadamichi. |
| | Fujiwara no Kinshi 藤原忻子 | Emperor Go-Shirakawa | 1156–1172 (7 years) | 1134–1209 (74–75 years) Daughter of Tokudaiji Kinyoshi. Empress dowager from 1172. |
| | Princess Muneko 統子内親王 | Honorary; adoptive mother of Emperor Go-Shirakawa | 1158–1159 (11 months) | 1126–1189 (62 years) Daughter of Emperor Toba and Fujiwara no Tamako; sister of Emperor Go-Shirakawa. |
| | Princess Yoshiko 姝子内親王 | Emperor Nijō | 1159–1162 (2 years) | 1141–1176 (34 years) Daughter of Emperor Toba and Fujiwara no Nariko. |
| | Fujiwara no Ikushi 藤原育子 | Emperor Nijō | 1162–1173 (11 years) | 1146–1173 (26–27 years) Daughter of Tokudaiji Saneyoshi; foster mother of Emperor Rokujō. |
| | Taira no Tokuko 平徳子 | Emperor Takakura | 1172–1182 (9 years) | 1155–1214 (58–59 years) Daughter of Emperor Go-Shirakawa. Gave birth to Emperor Antoku. |
| | Princess Sukeko 亮子内親王 | Honorary; adoptive mother of Emperor Antoku (until 1183) Honorary; adoptive mother of Emperor Go-Toba (from 1183) | 1182–1187 (4 years) | 1147–1216 (68–69 years) Daughter of Emperor Go-Shirakawa; aunt of Emperor Antoku and Emperor Go-Toba. |
| | Fujiwara no Ninshi 藤原任子 | Emperor Go-Toba | 1190–1200 (10 years) | 1173–1239 (65 years) Daughter of Fujiwara no Kanezane. Gave birth to Princess Shōshi (1195–1211). |
| | Princess Noriko 範子内親王 | Honorary; adoptive mother of Emperor Tsuchimikado | 1198–1206 (8 years) | 1177–1210 (32 years) Daughter of Emperor Takakura; aunt of Emperor Tsuchimikado. |
| | Fujiwara no Reishi 藤原麗子 | Emperor Tsuchimikado | 1205–1210 (4 years) | 1185–1243 (57–58 years) Daughter of Fujiwara no Yorizane. |
| | Princess Shōshi 昇子内親王 | Honorary; adoptive mother of Prince Morinari | 1208–1209 (8 months) | 1195–1211 (16 years) Daughter of Emperor Go-Toba and Fujiwara no Ninshi; sister of Prince Morinari (later Emperor Juntoku). |
| | Fujiwara no Ritsushi 九条立子 | Emperor Juntoku | 1211–1222 (11 years) | 1192–1248 (55–56 years) Daughter of Kujō Yoshitsune. Gave birth to Emperor Chūkyō and one other child. |
| | Princess Kuniko 邦子内親王 | Honorary; adoptive mother of Emperor Go-Horikawa | 1222–1224 (2 years) | 1209–1283 (73–74 years) Daughter of Prince Morisada; granddaughter of Emperor Takakura; sister of Emperor Go-Horikawa. Surrogate mother to Emperor Kameyama. |
| | Fujiwara no Ariko 藤原有子 | Emperor Go-Horikawa | 1223–1227 (3 years) | 1207–1286 (78–79 years) Daughter of Sanjō Kinfusa. |
| | Fujiwara no Chōshi 藤原長子 | Emperor Go-Horikawa | 1226–1229 (2 years) | 1218–1275 (56–57 years) Daughter of Konoe Iezane. |
| | Fujiwara no Shunshi 藤原竴子 | Emperor Go-Horikawa | 1230–1233 (3 years) | 1218–1275 (56–57 years) Daughter of Kujō Michiie. Gave birth to Emperor Shijō and one other child. |
| | Princess Rishi 利子内親王 | Honorary; adoptive mother of Emperor Shijō | 1233–1239 (6 years) | 1197–1251 (53–54 years) Daughter of Prince Morisada; granddaughter of Emperor Takakura; aunt of Emperor Shijō. |
| | Fujiwara no Kisshi 藤原姞子 | Emperor Go-Saga | 1242–1248 (6 years) | 1225–1292 (66–67 years) Daughter of Saionji Saneuji. Gave birth to Emperor Go-Fukakusa, Emperor Kameyama and three other children. |
| | Princess Teruko 曦子内親王 | Honorary; adoptive mother of Emperor Go-Saga | 1248–1251 (2 years) | 1224–1262 (37–38 years) Daughter of Emperor Tsuchimikado; aunt of Emperor Go-Saga. |
| | Fujiwara no Kimiko 藤原公子 | Emperor Go-Fukakusa | 1257–1260 (2 years) | 1232–1304 (71–72 years) Daughter of Saionji Saneuji. Gave birth to Princess Reishi (1270–1307) and one other child. |
| | Fujiwara no Saneko 藤原佶子 | Emperor Kameyama | 1261–1272 (11 years) | 1245–1272 (26–27 years) Daughter of Tōin Saneo. Gave birth to Emperor Go-Uda and two other children. |
| | Fujiwara no Kishi 藤原嬉子 | Emperor Kameyama | 1261–1269 (7 years) | 1252–1318 (65–66 years) Daughter of Saionji Kinsuke. |
| | Princess Reishi 姈子内親王 | Emperor Go-Uda | 1285–1291 (5 years) | 1270–1307 (36 years) Daughter of Emperor Go-Fukakusa and Fujiwara no Kimiko. |
| | Saionji Shōshi 西園寺鏱子 | Emperor Fushimi | 1288–1298 (9 years) | 1271–1342 (70–71 years) Daughter of Saionji Sanekane. Poet. Adopted Emperor Go-Fushimi. |
| | Fujiwara no Kinshi 藤原忻子 | Emperor Go-Nijō | 1303–1308 (4 years) | 1283–1352 (68–69 years) Daughter of Tokudaiji Kintaka. |
| | Princess Shōshi 奨子内親王 | Honorary Empress of Emperor Go-Daigo | 1319 (6 months) | 1286–1348 (62 years) Daughter of Emperor Go-Uda; half-sister of Emperor Go-Daigo. |
| | Saionji Kishi 西園寺禧子 | Emperor Go-Daigo | 1319–1333 (14 years) | after 1295 and before 1305–1333 (27–38 years) Daughter of Saionji Sanekane. Poet. Married Emperor Go-Daigo in 1314. Gave birth to Princess Kanshi and one other child. Empress dowager from 1333. |
| | Princess Junshi 珣子内親王 | Emperor Go-Daigo | 1334–1337 (3 years) | 1311–1337 (25–26 years) Daughter of Emperor Go-Fushimi. Gave birth to one child. |
| | Daughter of Saionji Kinshige | Emperor Chōkei | appointed as early as 1371 | Name unknown. Gave birth to one child. |
| | Tokugawa Masako 徳川和子 | Emperor Go-Mizunoo | 1624–1629 (5 years) | 1607–1678 (70 years) Daughter of Tokugawa Hidetada. Gave birth to Empress Meishō and six other children. Adopted Emperor Go-Kōmyō and Emperor Go-Sai. |
| | Takatsukasa Fusako 鷹司房子 | Emperor Reigen | 1683–1687 (3 years) | 1653–1712 (58 years) Daughter of Takatsukasa Norihira. Gave birth to one child. |
| | Princess Yukiko 幸子女王 | Emperor Higashiyama | 1708–1710 (2 years) | 1680–1720 (39 years) Daughter of Prince Arisugawa Yukihito. Gave birth to one child. |
| | Princess Yoshiko 欣子内親王 | Emperor Kōkaku | 1794–1820 (26 years) | 1779–1846 (67 years) Daughter of Emperor Go-Momozono. Last daughter of an emperor to become empress. Gave birth to two children. Adopted Emperor Ninkō. Empress dowager from 1820. |
| | Takatsukasa Tsunako 鷹司繋子 | Emperor Ninkō | posthumously appointed in 1824 | 1798–1823 (24–25 years) Daughter of Takatsukasa Masahiro. Married Emperor Ninkō in 1817. Gave birth to two children. |
| | Ichijō Masako 一条勝子 | Emperor Meiji | 11 January 1869 – 30 July 1912 (43 years, 201 days) | 9 May 1849 – 9 April 1914 (64 years, 335 days) Daughter of Tadayoshi Ichijō. Married Emperor Meiji on 11 January 1869. Adopted Emperor Taishō (son of Emperor Meiji and Yanagiwara Naruko). Empress dowager from her husband's death in 1912 until her death in 1914. |
| | Kujō Sadako 九条節子 | Emperor Taishō | 30 July 1912 – 25 December 1926 (14 years, 148 days) | 25 June 1884 – 17 May 1951 (66 years, 327 days) Daughter of Kujō Michitaka. Married Emperor Taishō on 10 May 1900. Gave birth to four sons. Empress Dowager from her husband's death in 1926 until her death in 1951. |
| | Princess Nagako 良子女王 | Emperor Shōwa | 25 December 1926 – 7 January 1989 (62 years, 13 days) | 6 March 1903 – 16 June 2000 (97 years, 92 days) Daughter of Prince Kuni Kuniyoshi. Married Emperor Shōwa on 26 January 1924. Gave birth to seven children. Empress Dowager from her husband's death in 1989 until her death in 2000. |
| | Shōda Michiko 正田美智子 | Akihito | 7 January 1989 – 30 April 2019 (30 years, 113 days) | born 20 October 1934 (92 years, 33 days) Daughter of Hidesaburō Shōda. Married Akihito on 10 April 1959. Gave birth to three children. Empress Emerita from her husband's abdication in 2019. |
| | Owada Masako 小和田雅子 | Naruhito | 1 May 2019 – present (7 years, 205 days) | born 9 December 1963 (62 years, 348 days) Daughter of Hisashi Owada. Married Naruhito on 9 June 1993. Gave birth to one daughter. |

=== List of empresses dowager ===
| Portrait | Name | Reign | Life details |
|---|---|---|---|
| | Himetataraisuzu-hime 媛蹈鞴五十鈴媛 | appointed in 581 BC | Empress consort of Emperor Jimmu from 660 BC until 581 BC. |
| | Isuzuyori-hime 五十鈴依媛命 | appointed in 548 BC | Empress consort of Emperor Suizei from 580 BC until 548 BC. |
| | Nunasokonakatsu-hime 渟名底仲媛命 | appointed in 510 BC | Empress consort of Emperor Annei from 546 BC until 510 BC. |
| | Amonotoyototsu-hime 天豊津媛命 | appointed in 475 BC | Empress consort of Emperor Itoku from 509 BC until 475 BC. |
| | Yosotarashi-hime 世襲足媛 | appointed in 392 BC | Empress consort of Emperor Kōshō from 447 BC until 392 BC. |
| | Oshihime 押媛 | appointed in 290 BC | Empress consort of Emperor Kōan from 367 BC until 290 BC. |
| | Kuwashi-hime 細媛命 | appointed in 214 BC | Empress consort of Emperor Kōrei from 289 BC until 214 BC. |
| | Utsushikome 欝色謎命 | appointed in 157 BC | Empress consort of Emperor Kōgen from 208 BC until 157 BC. |
| | Ikagashikome 伊香色謎命 | appointed in 97 BC | Empress consort of Emperor Kaika from 152 BC until 97 BC. |
| | Mimaki-hime 御間城姫 | appointed in 29 BC | Empress consort of Emperor Sujin from 97 BC until 29 BC. |
| | Yasakairi-hime 八坂入媛命 | appointed in 132 | Empress consort of Emperor Keikō from 122 until 132. |
| | Futaji Irihime 両道入姫命 | appointed in 192 | Daughter of Emperor Suinin. Spouse of Yamato Takeru. Gave birth to Emperor Chūai and three other children. |
| | Okinagatarashi-hime 気長足姫尊 | 201–269 (68 years) | 169–269 (100 years) Empress consort of Emperor Chūai from 193 until 201. Regent of Emperor Ōjin from 201 until 269. |
| | Nakatsu-hime 仲姫命 | appointed in 313 | Empress consort of Emperor Ōjin from 271 until 313. |
| | Oshisaka no Ōnakatsuhime 忍坂大中姫 | appointed in 453 | Empress consort of Emperor Ingyō from 413 until 453. |
| | Princess Tachibana no Nakatsu 橘仲皇女 | appointed in 539 | Empress consort of Emperor Senka from 536 until 539. |
| | Princess Ishi-hime 石姫皇女 | appointed in 572 | Empress consort of Emperor Kinmei from 540 until 572. |
| | Fujiwara Asukabehime 藤原安宿媛 | 749–760 (10 years) | 701–760 (58–59 years) Empress consort of Emperor Shōmu from 729 until 749. |
| | Ki no Tochihime 紀橡姫 | posthumously appointed in 771 | died 709 Daughter of Ki no Morohito. Spouse of Prince Shiki. Gave birth to Emperor Kōnin and one other child. |
| | Takano no Niigasa 石姫皇女 | 790–806 (16 years, posthumous) | ca. 720–790 (70 years) Daughter of Yamato no Ototsugu. Concubine of Emperor Kōnin. Gave birth to Emperor Kanmu and two other children. Posthumously appointed grand empress dowager in 806. |
| | Fujiwara no Otomuro 藤原乙牟漏 | posthumously appointed in 806 | 760–790 (29–30 years) Empress consort of Emperor Kanmu from 783 until 790. |
| | Fujiwara no Ryoshi 藤原旅子 | posthumously appointed in 823 | 759–788 (28–29 years) Daughter of Fujiwara no Momokawa. Consort of Emperor Kanmu from 785 until 788. Gave birth to Emperor Junna. |
| | Tachibana no Kachiko 橘嘉智子 | 823–833 (9 years) | 786–850 (63–64 years) Empress consort of Emperor Saga from 815 until 823. Grand empress dowager from 833. |
| | Princess Seishi 正子内親王 | 833–854 (21 years) | 810–879 (68–69 years) Empress consort of Emperor Junna from 827 until 833. Grand empress dowager from 854. |
| | Fujiwara no Junshi 藤原順子 | 854–864 (9 years) | 809–871 (61–62 years) Daughter of Fujiwara no Fuyutsugu. Consort of Emperor Ninmyō from 833 until 850. Grand empress dowager from 864. |
| | Fujiwara no Akirakeiko 藤原明子 | 864–882 (17 years) | 829–900 (70–71 years) Daughter of Fujiwara no Yoshifusa. Consort of Emperor Montoku from 850 to 858. Grand empress dowager from 882. |
| | Fujiwara no Takaiko 藤原高子 | 882–896 (12 years) posthumously restored in 943 | 842–910 (67–68 years) Daughter of Fujiwara no Nagara. Consort of Emperor Seiwa from 866 to 877. Title of empress dowager removed in 896 due to a suspected affair with Zenyu, head priest of the Toko-ji Temple. Title posthumously restored in 943. |
| | Fujiwara no Sawako 藤原沢子 | posthumously appointed in 884 | died 839 Daughter of Fujiwara no Fusatsugu. Consort of Emperor Ninmyō from 833 until 839. Gave birth to Emperor Kōkō and three other children. |
| | Fujiwara no Inshi 藤原胤子 | posthumously appointed in 897 | died 896 Daughter of Fujiwara no Takafuji. Consort of Emperor Uda from 892 until 896. Gave birth to Emperor Daigo and four other children. |
| | Princess Hanshi 班子女王 | 897–900 (2 years) | 833–900 (66–67 years) Daughter of Prince Nakano; granddaughter of Emperor Kanmu. Consort of Emperor Kōkō from 884 until 887. Gave birth to Emperor Uda and seven other children. |
| | Fujiwara no Onshi 藤原穏子 | 931–946 (14 years) | 885–954 (68–69 years) Empress Consort of Emperor Daigo from 923 until 931. Grand empress dowager from 946. |
| | Fujiwara no Anshi 藤原安子 | 968–969 (1 year, posthumous) | 927–964 (68–69 years) Empress Consort of Emperor Murakami from 958 until 964. Posthumously appointed grand empress dowager in 969. |
| | Princess Masako 昌子内親王 | 973–986 (13 years) | 950–1000 (49–50 years) Empress Consort of Emperor Reizei from 967 until 973. Grand empress dowager from 986. |
| | Fujiwara no Chikako 藤原懐子 | posthumously appointed in 985 | 945–975 (29–30 years) Daughter of Fujiwara no Koretada. Consort of Emperor Reizei from 967 until 975. Gave birth to Emperor Kazan and two more children. |
| | Fujiwara no Senshi 藤原詮子 | 986–991 (5 years) | 962–1002 (39–40 years) Daughter of Fujiwara no Kaneie. Consort of Emperor En'yū from 978 until 986. Priestess from 991. |
| | Fujiwara no Junshi 藤原遵子 | 1000–1012 (11 years) | 957–1017 (59–60 years) Empress consort of Emperor En'yū from 982 until 997. Grand empress dowager from 1012. |
| | Fujiwara no Tōko 藤原超子 | posthumously appointed in 1011 | 954–982 (27–28 years) Daughter of Fujiwara no Kaneie. Consort of Emperor Reizei from 968 until 982. Gave birth to Emperor Sanjō and three other children. |
| | Fujiwara no Shōshi 藤原彰子 | 1012–1018 (5 years) | 988–1074 (86 years) Empress consort of Emperor Ichijō from 1000 until 1012. Grand empress dowager from 1018. |
| | Fujiwara no Kenshi 藤原妍子 | 1018–1027 (8 years) | 994–1027 (32–33 years) Empress consort of Emperor Sanjō from 1012 until 1018. |
| | Fujiwara no Kishi 藤原嬉子 | posthumously appointed in 1045 | 1007–1025 (18 years) Daughter of Fujiwara no Michinaga. Spouse of then Prince Atsunaga (later Emperor Go-Suzaku). Gave birth to Emperor Go-Reizei. Died prior to the accession of Emperor Go-Suzaku. |
| | Princess Teishi 禎子内親王 | 1051–1068 (17 years) | 1013–1094 (80 years) Empress consort of Emperor Go-Suzaku from 1037 until 1051. Grand empress dowager from 1068. |
| | Princess Shōshi 章子内親王 | 1068–1069 (1 year) | 1027–1105 (77–78 years) Empress consort of Emperor Go-Reizei from 1046 until 1068. Grand empress dowager from 1069. |
| | Fujiwara no Hiroko 藤原寛子 | 1069–1074 (4 years) | 1036–1127 (90–91 years) Empress consort of Emperor Go-Reizei from 1051 until 1069. Grand empress dowager from 1074. |
| | Fujiwara no Shigeko 藤原茂子 | posthumously appointed in 1073 | died 1062 Daughter of Fujiwara Kinnari. Adopted daughter of Fujiwara Yoshinobu. Spouse of Prince Takahito (later Emperor Go-Sanjō) from 1046 until 1062. Gave birth to Emperor Shirakawa, Princess Tokushi and three other children. Died prior to the accession of Emperor Go-Sanjō. |
| | Fujiwara no Kanshi 藤原歓子 | 1074–1102 (28 years) | 1021–1102 (80–81 years) Empress consort of Emperor Go-Reizei from 1068 until 1074. |
| | Fujiwara no Kenshi 藤原賢子 | posthumously appointed in 1088 | 1057–1084 (26–27 years) Empress consort of Emperor Shirakawa from 1074 until 1084. |
| | Fujiwara no Ishi 藤原苡子 | posthumously appointed in 1107 | 1076–1103 (26–27 years) Daughter of Fujiwara no Sanesue. Consort of Emperor Horikawa from 1098 until 1103. Gave birth to Emperor Toba. |
| | Fujiwara no Kiyoko 藤原聖子 | 1142–1150 (8 years) | 1122–1182 (59–60 years) Empress consort of Emperor Sutoku from 1130 until 1142. Received an imperial title in 1150. |
| | Fujiwara no Tashi 藤原多子 | 1156–1158 (1 year) | 1140–1202 (61–62 years) Empress consort of Emperor Konoe from 1150 until 1156. Grand empress dowager from 1158. |
| | Minamoto no Yoshiko 源懿子 | posthumously appointed in 1159 | 1116–1143 (27–28 years) Daughter of Fujiwara no Tsunizage. Adopted daughter of Minamoto no Arihito. Spouse of Prince Masahito (later Emperor Go-Shirakawa). Gave birth to Emperor Nijō. Died prior to the accession of Emperor Go-Shirakawa. |
| | Fujiwara no Teishi 藤原呈子 | 1158–1168 (10 years) | 1131–1176 (44–45 years) Empress consort of Emperor Konoe from 1150 until 1158. Received an imperial title in 1168. |
| | Taira no Shigeko 平滋子 | 1168–1169 (1 year) | 1142–1176 (44–45 years) Daughter of Taira no Tokinobu. Consort of Emperor Go-Shirakawa following his abdication until 1168. Gave birth to Emperor Takakura. Received an imperial title in 1169. |
| | Fujiwara no Kinshi 藤原忻子 | 1172–1209 (37 years) | 1134–1209 (74–75 years) Empress consort of Emperor Go-Shirakawa from 1156 until 1172. |
| | Minamoto no Michiko 源通子 | posthumously appointed in 1243 | died 1221 Daughter of Minamoto no Michimune. Lady-in-waiting of Emperor Tsuchimikado. Gave birth to Emperor Go-Saga and four other children. |
| | Saionji Kishi 西園寺禧子 | 1333 (1 month) | after 1295 and before 1305–1333 (27–38 years) Empress consort of Emperor Go-Daigo from 1319 until 1333. |
| | Ano no Renshi 阿野廉子 | 1339–1352 (12 years) | 1301–1359 (57–58 years) Daughter of Ano Kinkado; adopted daughter of Tōin Kinkata. Consort of Emperor Go-Daigo from 1335 until 1339. Received an imperial title in 1352. |
| | Niwata Asako 庭田朝子 | posthumously appointed in 1504 | 1437–1492 (54–55 years) Daughter of Niwata Shigekata. Lady-in-waiting of Emperor Go-Tsuchimikado. Gave birth to Emperor Go-Kashiwabara and two other children. |
| | Madenokōji Eiko 万里小路栄子 | posthumously appointed in 1558 | 1499–1522 (20–21 years) Daughter of Madenokōji Katafusa. Spouse of Prince Tomohito (later Emperor Go-Nara). Gave birth to Emperor Ōgimachi and one other child. Died prior to the accession of Emperor Go-Nara. |
| | Konoe Hisako 近衛尚子 | posthumously appointed in 1728 | 1702–1720 (17 years) Daughter of Konoe Iehiro. Consort of Emperor Nakamikado from 1716 until 1720. Gave birth to Emperor Sakuramachi. |
| | Nijō Ieko 近衛尚子 | 1747–1750 (3 years) | 1716–1790 (73 years) Daughter of Nijō Yoshitada. Consort of Emperor Sakuramachi from 1736 until 1747. Gave birth to Empress Go-Sakuramachi and one other child. Received an imperial title in 1750. |
| | Ichijō Tomiko 一条富子 | 1771 (2 months) | 1743–1796 (52 years) Daughter of Ichijō Kaneka. Consort of Emperor Momozono from 1759 until 1771. Gave birth to Emperor Go-Momozono and one other child. Received an imperial title in 1771. |
| | Konoe Koreko 近衛維子 | 1781–1783 (2 years) | 1760–1783 (23 years) Daughter of Konoe Uchisaki. Consort of Emperor Go-Momozono from 1772 until 1781. Gave birth to Princess Yoshiko. Adopted Emperor Kōkaku. |
| | Princess Yoshiko 欣子内親王 | 1820–1841 (21 years) | 1779–1846 (67 years) Empress consort of Emperor Kōkaku from 1794 until 1820. Received an imperial title in 1841. |
| | Takatsukasa Yasuko 鷹司祺子 | 1847 (8 months) | 1811–1847 (36 years) Daughter of Takatsukasa Masahiro. Consort of Emperor Ninkō from 1825 until 1847. Gave birth to one child. |
| | Kujō Asako 九条夙子 | 1868–1897 (28 years) | 1835–1897 (62 years) Daughter of Kujō Hisatada. Consort of Emperor Kōmei from 1848 until 1868. Gave birth to two children. Adopted Emperor Meiji. |
| | Ichijō Masako 一条勝子 | 30 July 1912 – 9 April 1914 (1 year, 253 days) | 9 May 1849 – 9 April 1914 (64 years, 335 days) Empress consort of Emperor Meiji from 1869 until 1912. |
| | Kujō Sadako 九条節子 | 25 December 1926 – 17 May 1951 (24 years, 143 days) | 25 June 1884 – 17 May 1951 (66 years, 327 days) Empress consort of Emperor Taishō from 1912 until 1926. |
| | Princess Nagako 良子女王 | 7 January 1989 – 16 June 2000 (11 years, 161 days) | 6 March 1903 – 16 June 2000 (97 years, 92 days) Empress consort of Emperor Shōwa from 1926 until 1989. |

=== List of grand empresses dowager ===
| Portrait | Name | Reign | Life details |
|---|---|---|---|
| | Fujiwara no Miyako 藤原宮子 | 749–754 (5 years) | died 754 Daughter of Fujiwara no Fuhito. Spouse of Emperor Monmu from 697 until 707. Gave birth to Emperor Shōmu. |
| | Takano no Niigasa 石姫皇女 | posthumously appointed in 806 | ca. 720–790 (70 years) Concubine of Emperor Kōnin. Posthumous empress dowager from 790 until 806. |
| | Tachibana no Kachiko 橘嘉智子 | 833–850 (17 years) | 786–850 (63–64 years) Empress consort of Emperor Saga from 815 until 823. Empress dowager from 823 until 833. |
| | Princess Seishi 正子内親王 | 854–860 (6 years) | 810–879 (68–69 years) Empress consort of Emperor Junna from 827 until 833. Empress dowager from 833 until 854. Became a priestess in 860. |
| | Fujiwara no Junshi 藤原順子 | 864–871 (7 years) | 809–871 (61–62 years) Consort of Emperor Ninmyō from 833 until 850. Empress dowager from 854 until 864. |
| | Fujiwara no Akirakeiko 藤原明子 | 882–900 (18 years) | 829–900 (70–71 years) Consort of Emperor Montoku from 850 to 858. Empress dowager from 864 until 882. |
| | Fujiwara no Onshi 藤原穏子 | 946–954 (8 years) | 885–954 (68–69 years) Empress Consort of Emperor Daigo from 923 until 931. Empress dowager from 931 until 946. |
| | Fujiwara no Anshi 藤原安子 | posthumously appointed in 969 | 927–964 (68–69 years) Empress consort of Emperor Murakami from 958 until 964. Posthumous empress dowager from 968 until 969. |
| | Princess Masako 昌子内親王 | 986–1000 (4 years) | 950–1000 (49–50 years) Empress consort of Emperor Reizei from 967 until 973. Empress dowager from 973 until 986. |
| | Fujiwara no Junshi 藤原遵子 | 1012–1017 (5 years) | 957–1017 (59–60 years) Empress consort of Emperor En'yū from 982 until 997. Empress dowager from 1000 until 1012. |
| | Fujiwara no Shōshi 藤原彰子 | 1018–1074 (56 years) | 988–1074 (86 years) Empress consort of Emperor Ichijō from 1000 until 1012. Empress dowager from 1012 until 1018. |
| | Princess Teishi 禎子内親王 | 1068–1094 (18 years) | 1013–1094 (80 years) Empress consort of Emperor Go-Suzaku from 1037 until 1051. Empress dowager from 1051 until 1068. |
| | Princess Shōshi 章子内親王 | 1069–1105 (36 years) | 1027–1105 (77–78 years) Empress consort of Emperor Go-Reizei from 1046 until 1068. Empress dowager from 1068 until 1069. |
| | Princess Reishi 令子内親王 | 1134–1144 (10 years) | 1078–1144 (65–66 years) Honorary empress from 1108 until 1134. |
| | Fujiwara no Tashi 藤原多子 | 1158–1202 (44 years) | 1140–1202 (61–62 years) Empress consort of Emperor Konoe from 1150 until 1156. Empress dowager from 1156 until 1158. Consort of Emperor Nijō from 1160 until 1165. |

== See also ==
- Emperor of Japan
  - List of emperors of Japan
- Himiko
- Taiyoo
- Imperial House of Japan
- Japanese imperial succession debate
- Dayang Kalangitan
- Kōkyū
- List of Nyoin
- Midaidokoro
- List of female castellans in Japan
