= Kujō-in =

Fujiwara no Teishi 藤原呈子

Empress consort of Japan
- Tenure: July 18, 1150 – March 5, 1158

Empress dowager of Japan
- Tenure: 1158–1168
- Born: 1131
- Died: October 23, 1176 (aged 44–45)
- Spouse: Emperor Konoe
- House: Imperial House of Japan
- Father: Fujiwara no Koremichi
- Mother: Fujiwara no Tatsuko

Fujiwara no Teishi (藤原 呈子, also read Fujiwara no Shimeko; 1131 – October 23, 1176) was a Japanese noblewoman (nyoin) of the late Heian period. She was a consort to Emperor Konoe but did not bear him any children and entered religious orders in her mid twenties. Her dharma name was Shōjōkan (清浄観) and her ingō was Kujō-in (九条院).

== Biography ==
Fujiwara no Teishi was born in 1131 to Fujiwara no Koremichi and a daughter of Fujiwara no Akitaka. She became the adopted daughter of the kanpaku Fujiwara no Tadamichi. Like many Japanese noblewomen of the pre-modern era, the correct reading of her given name is uncertain, and the readings Teishi and Shimeko are speculative on and kun readings, respectively.

In Kyūan 6 (1150) she entered the service of Emperor Konoe, initially as a nyōgo and later become empress (chūgū). This was against the backdrop of between Tadamichi and his brother Yorinaga regarding whose daughter would be the mother of the future emperor. Unfortunately, she did not provide the emperor with an heir, and in Kyūju 2 (1155) she entered religious orders due to illness, taking the dharma name Shōjōkan. In Hōgen 1 (1156) she became Kōgō-gūshiki and in Hōgen 3 (1158) Kōtaigō-gūshiki. In Nin'an 3 (1168) she became a nyoin, with Kujō-in as her ingō.

She died in 1176.

Japanese royalty
Preceded by Fujiwara no Tashi	Empress consort of Japan; 1150–1158	Succeeded by Fujiwara no Kinshi
Preceded by Minamoto no Yoshiko (granted title posthumously)	Empress dowager of Japan; 1158–1168	Succeeded by Taira no Shigeko
