= Ninpei =

Period of Japanese history (1151–1154 CE)

Ninpei (仁平), also romanized as Nimpyō, was a Japanese era name (年号, nengō; lit. "year name") after Kyūan and before Kyūju. This period spanned the years from January 1151 through October 1154. The reigning emperor was Konoe-tennō (近衛天皇).

== Change of era ==
- January 20, 1151 Ninpei gannen (仁平元年): The new era name was created to mark an event or series of events. The previous era ended and a new one commenced in Kyūan 7, on the 26th day of the 1st month of 1151.

== Events of the Ninpei era ==
- 1151 (Ninpei 1, 1st month): Sadaijin Fujiwara no Yorinaga was given additional powers in the imperial court as "Naï-ken," which gave him the duty and opportunity of reading formal written requests before they should be presented to the emperor. This had been amongst the powers of the Sesshō or the Kampaku. Factions in the court who favored Yorinaga tended to dislike Daijō Daijin Fujiwara Tadamichi, and they employed any means possible to help elevate Yorinaga's position. However, Yorinaga was himself generally disliked because of his capricious character. his tactics and strategy for enhancing his own prestige were focused primarily on diminishing Tadamichi's role in the court.
- April 13, 1152 (Ninpei 2, 7th day of the 3rd month): Emperor Konoe visited the home of Emperor Toba-no-Hōō to celebrate his father's 50th birthday; and the emperor stayed until the next day, amusing himself with dances and with listening to musical performances.
- January 28, 1153 (Ninpei 3, 2nd day of the 1st month): Konoe visited his father's home; and in the same month Taira Tadamori, the head of the criminal tribunal, died; and this position was soon filed by his son, Taira Kiyomori.

== Notes ==
Preceded by Kyūan	Era or nengō Ninpei; 1151–1154	Succeeded by Kyūju
