= Emperor of Japan (disambiguation) =

The Emperor of Japan is the ceremonial monarch in Japan's system of constitutional monarchy and is the head of the Japanese Imperial Family.

Emperor of Japan may also refer to:

- Akihito (born 1933), emperor of Japan 1989–2019
- Naruhito (born 1960), Emperor of Japan since 2019
- Emperor of Japan, fictional character in musical stage work The Mikado

== See also ==
- List of Emperors of Japan
- Empress of Japan
