= Princess Yoshiko (consort of Nijō) =

Empress of Japan from 1159 to 1162

Princess Yoshiko 姝子内親王

Empress consort of Japan
- Tenure: March 12, 1159 – February 20, 1162
- Born: December 7, 1141
- Died: July 20, 1176 (aged 34)
- Spouse: Emperor Nijō
- House: Imperial House of Japan
- Father: Emperor Toba
- Mother: Fujiwara no Nariko

Princess Yoshiko (姝子内親王; December 7, 1141 – July 20, 1176), later Takamatsu-in (高松院), was a Japanese princess, and an empress consort of her nephew Emperor Nijō.

She was the daughter of Emperor Toba and Fujiwara no Nariko. She was thus the paternal aunt of her husband, though he was only two years younger than she.

== Notes ==
Japanese royalty
| Preceded by Princess Muneko | Empress consort of Japan; 1159–1162 | Succeeded by Fujiwara no Ikushi |
