= Fujiwara no Tashi =

Empress consort of Japan
- Tenure: 13 April 1150 – 11 December 1156
- Tenure: 1160 – 3 August 1165

Empress dowager of Japan
- Tenure: 11 December 1156 – 5 March 1158

Grand empress dowager of Japan
- Tenure: 5 March 1158 – 19 January 1202
- Born: 1140
- Died: January 19, 1202 (aged 61–62)
- Spouses: Emperor Konoe (m. 1150) Emperor Nijō (m. 1160)
- House: Fujiwara, Hokke and Tokudaiji branches (birth); Fujiwara, Mido branch (adoptive); Imperial House of Japan (marriage)
- Father: Tokudaiji Kin'yoshi (birth); Fujiwara no Yorinaga (adoptive)
- Mother: Fujiwara Goshi (birth); Tokudaiji Sachiko (adoptive)

Fujiwara no Tashi (藤原多子; 1140 – January 12, 1202) was an empress consort of Japan. She was first the consort of Emperor Konoe, and then of Emperor Nijō. Because she became consort twice, she was called the "Empress of Two Generations". Her birth father was Tokudaiji Kin'yoshi. Her adoptive father was Fujiwara no Yorinaga.

== Biography ==
In 1155, Emperor Konoe died, and Fujiwara no Tashi lived in quiet retirement. A few years later, when Emperor Nijo ascended the throne, he demanded that Fujiwara no Tashi – now around 22 years old, and renowned for her beauty – be appointed his empress consort. This caused debate and scandal amongst the council and court, as there had never in Japanese history been a woman who was consort to two emperors. Nonetheless, Emperor Nijo insisted, and Fujiwara no Tashi became his empress consort; some chronicles state that she was reluctant to do so.

She had several other names in her lifetime, these being Fujiwara no Ōiko, Fujiwara no Masuko and Fujiwara no Tadako.

Fujiwara no Yorinaga married Tokudaiji Kin'yoshi's eldest sister, Sachiko (Tashi's aunt), and raised Tashi as his daughter from a young age.

She was married to Emperor Konoe in 1150. After the Emperor's death in 1155, Tashi left the palace to live in seclusion.

In 1160, at the age of 21, she was called back to the palace by Emperor Nijō and became his empress. She is the only Japanese empress to have become one twice, and became the last known grand empress dowager (太皇太后, taikōtaikō) of Japan.

When Emperor Nijō died in 1165, Tashi renounced the world to become a Buddhist priest. She became well known for her writing, art, and musical abilities. She died at the age of 62.

== Notes ==
Japanese royalty
| Preceded by Fujiwara no Nariko | Empress consort of Japan; 1150–1156 | Succeeded by Fujiwara no Teishi |
| Preceded by Fujiwara no Kiyoko | Empress dowager of Japan; 1156–1158 | Succeeded by Minamoto no Yoshiko (granted title posthumously) |
| Preceded by Princess Reishi | Grand empress dowager of Japan; 1158–1202 | Succeeded by None |
