= Fujiwara no Kinshi (Go-Shirakawa) =

Fujiwara no Kinshi 藤原忻子

Empress consort of Japan
- Tenure: November 11, 1156 – March 6, 1172

Empress dowager of Japan
- Tenure: 1172–1209
- Born: 1134
- Died: September 12, 1209 (aged 74–75); Heian-kyō (Kyōto)
- Spouse: Emperor Go-Shirakawa
- House: Imperial House of Japan
- Father: Tokudaiji Kinyoshi
- Mother: Fujiwara no Goshi

Fujiwara no Kinshi (藤原 忻子; 1134 – September 12, 1209) was an empress consort of Japan. She was the consort of Emperor Go-Shirakawa of Japan.

She was born as the daughter of Tokudaiji Kinyoshi. She entered the Imperial Court and became a lady-in-waiting in 1155. She was made empress consort of Emperor Go-Shirakawa in 1156. Emperor Go-Shirakawa abdicated 2 years later. She was made empress dowager in 1172 and died at the age of 76 in 1209.

== Notes ==
Japanese royalty
| Preceded by Fujiwara no Shimeko | Empress consort of Japan; 1156–1172 | Succeeded by Princess Muneko |
| Preceded by Taira no Shigeko | Empress dowager of Japan; 1172–1209 | Succeeded by Minamoto no Michiko (granted title posthumously) |
