= Ten'yō =

Period of Japanese history (1144–1145 CE)

Ten'yō (天養) was a Japanese era name (年号, nengō, lit. "year name") after Kōji and before Kyūan. This period spanned the year from February 1144 through July 1145. The reigning emperor was Konoe-tennō (近衛天皇).

== Change of Era ==
- February 6, 1144 Ten'yō gannen (天養元年): The new era name was created to mark an event or series of events. The previous era ended and a new one commenced on March 27, 1144 (Kōji 3, on the 22nd day of the 2nd month).

== Events of the Ten'yō Era ==
- 1144 (Ten'yō 1, 7th month): A new era name was created because a comet was sighted in the sky in the 7th month of Ten'yō gannen.
- 1145 (Ten'yō 1, 8th month): The empress Taiken-mon In, mother of former-Emperor Sutoku died.
- 1145 (Ten'yō 1): The emperor went to Iwashimizu Shrine and to the Kamo Shrines.

== Notes ==
Preceded by Kōji	Era or nengō Ten'yō; 1144–1145	Succeeded by Kyūan
