= Princess Muneko =

Princess Muneko 統子内親王

Empress consort of Japan
- Tenure: 5 March 1158 – 4 March 1159
- Born: 13 August 1126
- Died: 20 July 1189 (aged 62); Heian-kyō (Kyōto)
- House: Imperial House of Japan
- Father: Emperor Toba
- Mother: Fujiwara no Tamako

Princess Muneko (統子内親王; 13 August 1126 – 20 July 1189), later known as Jōsaimon-in (上西門院), was a princess and an honorary Empress of Japan.

She was the daughter of Emperor Toba and Fujiwara no Tamako. She served as Saiin at Kamo Shrine in 1127–1132. She retired from her service as priestess for health reasons. She served as honorary interim empress of her nephew Emperor Nijō awaiting the appointment of a permanent empress. She retired when her nephew married his aunt, her half-sister Princess Yoshiko.

In 1160, following her mother's example, she was ordained as a Buddhist nun at Hōkongō-in. She lived at Hōkongō-in until forced to relocate in 1181 due to a fire.

Japanese royalty
Preceded by Fujiwara no Kinshi	Empress consort of Japan; 1158–1159	Succeeded by Princess Yoshiko
