= Fujiwara no Junshi =

Fujiwara no Junshi 藤原遵子

Empress consort of Japan
- Tenure: April 7, 982 – September 24, 984

Empress dowager of Japan
- Tenure: 1000–1012

Grand empress dowager of Japan
- Tenure: 1012–1017
- Born: 957
- Died: June 27, 1017 (aged 59–60)
- Spouse: Emperor En'yū
- House: Imperial House of Japan
- Father: Fujiwara no Yoritada

Fujiwara no Junshi (藤原 遵子; 957 – June 27, 1017) was an empress consort of Japan. She was the consort of Emperor En'yū of Japan.

== Biography ==
She was the daughter of regent Fujiwara no Yoritada. She was placed in the harem of the Emperor to benefit her father in his rivalry with his cousin Fujiwara no Kaneie, who also placed his daughter Fujiwara no Senshi for the same reason, that she would give birth to a Crown Prince and became Empress: Fujiwara no Junshi did become Empress, but it was Fujiwara no Senshi who gave birth to a Crown Prince, while Junshi had no children.

She ordained as a Buddhist nun in 997.

== Notes ==
Japanese royalty
Preceded by Fujiwara no Koshi	Empress consort of Japan; 982–984	Succeeded by Fujiwara no Teishi
Preceded by Fujiwara no Senshi	Empress dowager of Japan; 1000–1012	Succeeded by Fujiwara no Tōko (granted title posthumously)
Preceded by Princess Masako	Grand empress dowager of Japan; 1012–1017	Succeeded by Fujiwara no Shōshi
