= Princess Shōshi (1137–1211) =

Japanese princess

Princess Shōshi 暲子内親王
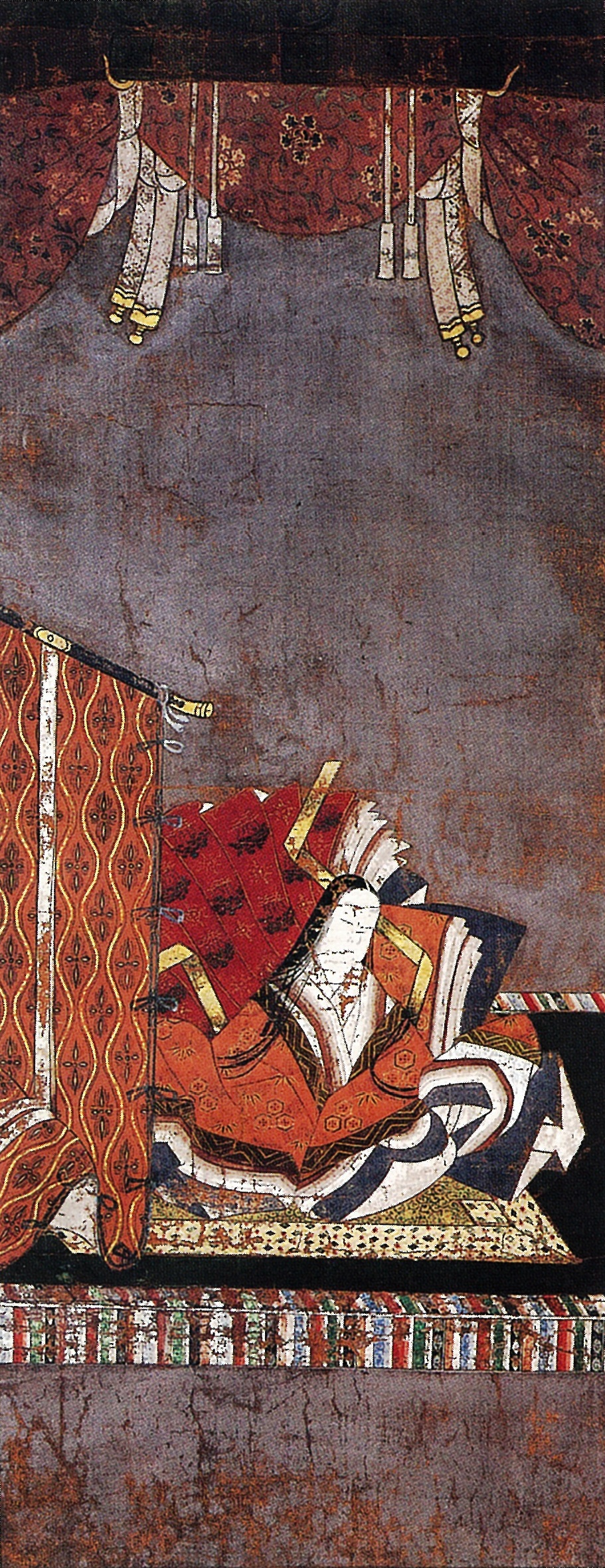
- Born: April 29, 1137
- Died: 6 August 1211 (aged 74)
- Issue: See adopted children
Temple name
- Hachijō-in 八条院
- House: Imperial House of Japan
- Father: Emperor Toba
- Mother: Fujiwara no Nariko

Princess Shōshi (Note: Kun'yomi: Princess Akiko) (暲子内親王; Shōshi Naishinnō), later known as Hachijō-in (八条院), was a Japanese princess.

== Birth and early life ==
Shōshi was born in 1137 to Emperor Toba and his wife, Fujiwara no Nariko.

The emperor was said to favour her above all his children. Following the death of Emperor Konoe, Princess Shōshi was a favoured candidate by the retired Emperor Toba to succeed to the throne, though she never did.

Emperor Toba himself died a year later in 1156 and Shōshi found herself the inheritor of most of his properties and estates which would eventually lead to her consolidating power in the imperial court.

== In power ==
=== Powerful land owner ===
Due to coming into many possessions, the princess became a powerful land owner and built herself a manor. Due to her vast land holdings, the estate of Hachijō-ryō was built on Hachijō-chō (which no longer exists). By utilizing her holdings, she became very wealthy, and thanks to this she was able to financially support her adopted sons Emperor Nijō and Prince Mochihito. She was partly able to build such a large estate due to both receiving inheritance, and, thanks to her growing influence, through donations from nobles.

=== During the Genpei war ===
During the Genpei War the emperor, Antoku fled the capital. Shōshi remained in her residences and was the de facto ruler of Japan along with Emperor Go-Shirakawa. The princess wielded such authority during these times that she was considered once again for succession to the throne as an empress regnant. Whilst she did not come to the throne, she was consulted in the discussions for choosing a successor to Antoku.

During the war, Shōshi supported Prince Mochihito during his rebellion and was a supporter of the Minamoto clan.

== Later life and death ==
The initial heirs to her estates were Emperor Nijō and Prince Mochihito, both of whom died before her. As a result, her next heir was Mochihito's daughter, Princess Sanjō, but she also predeceased her and so Shōshi had no heirs.

Eventually, Shōshi began bequeathing land to some of her relatives and she died on August 6, 1211, aged 74. As for her lands after that, they were eventually inherited as Imperial Property by Emperor Go-Uda but eventually became an agricultural property after the emperor gifted these lands.

== Adopted children ==
- Emperor Nijō, son of Emperor Go-Shirakawa and Minamoto Atsushiko.
- Prince Mochihito, son of Emperor Go-Shirakawa and Fujiwara no Shigeko.
- Kujō Yoshisuke, son of Fujiwara no Kanezane and Hachijoin-no-tsubone.
- Princess Sanjō, daughter of Prince Mochihito and Hachijoin-no-tsubone.
- Princess Shōshi, daughter of Emperor Go-Toba and Kujō Ninshi.
