= Kyūan =

Period of Japanese history (1145–1151 CE)

Kyūan (久安), also romanized as Kyū-an, was a Japanese era name (年号, nengō, lit. "year name") after Ten'yō and before Ninpei. This period spanned the years from July 1145 through January 1151. The reigning emperor was Konoe-tennō (近衛天皇).

== Change of Era ==
- January 25, 1145 Kyūan gannen (久安元年): The new era name was created because a comet was sighted in the sky in the 7th month of Ten'yō gannen. One era ended and a new one commenced in Ten'yō 1, on the 22nd day of the 7th month of 1145.

== Events ==
- 1145 (Kyūan 1, 8th month): The mother of former-Emperor Sutoku, Taiken-mon In, died.
- 1146 (Kyūan 2, 2nd month), Emperor Konoe visited Emperor Toba-no-Hōō.
- 1146 (Kyūan 2, 12th month), Konoe joined in a celebration honoring Sesshō Fujiwara no Tadamichi (the regent) on his 58th birthday.
- 1148 (Kyūan 4, 6th month, 26th day): The imperial palace was consumed by flames.
- 1150 (Kyūan 6, 1st month): Konoe assumed the role of a mature adult; and he married Fujiwara-no Tokoku, who had been raised by sadaijin Fujiwara-no Yorinaga. Tokoku was the daughter of dainagon Taira-no Kiyomori. This bride became kōgū (first empress).
- 1150 (Kyūan 6, 3rd month): Konoe married again, this time to a daughter raised by Sesshō Fujiwara-no Tadamichi. She was the daughter of Dainagon Fujiwara-no Koremichi. This bride became chūgyo (second empress). Konoe was so very much enamoured of this second wife that he neglected his first wife, which caused discord in the kugyō, especially between Tadamichi and Yorinaga.
- 1150 (Kyūan 6, 12th month): Sesshō Minamoto-no Tadamichi, resigns his position and is named daijō daijin. In this same month, Minamoto-no Yoshikane became head of the Ashikaga clan in Shimotsuke Province.

== Notes ==
Preceded by Ten'yō	Era or nengō Kyūan; 1145–1151	Succeeded by Ninpei
