= Fujiwara no Koshi =

Fujiwara no Koshi 藤原媓子

Empress consort of Japan
- Tenure: August 1, 973 – June 29, 979
- Born: 947
- Died: June 29, 979 (aged 31–32)
- Spouse: Emperor En'yū
- House: Imperial House of Japan
- Father: Fujiwara no Kanemichi

Fujiwara no Koshi (藤原 媓子; 947 – June 29, 979) was an empress consort of Japan. She was the consort of Emperor En'yū of Japan.

== Biography ==
She was the daughter of regent Fujiwara no Kanemichi. She was placed in the Imperial harem to benefit her father in his rivalry with his brother Fujiwara no Kaneie by giving birth to an heir. She did not give birth to a Crown Prince and was replaced as an Empress by the daughter of her father's cousin and designated successor as regent, Fujiwara no Yoritada.

== Notes ==
Japanese royalty
Preceded by Princess Masako	Empress consort of Japan; 973–979	Succeeded by Fujiwara no Junshi
