= Princess Masako (consort of Reizei) =

Princess Masako 昌子内親王

Empress consort of Japan
- Tenure: October 9, 967 – August 1, 973

Empress dowager of Japan
- Tenure: 973–986

Grand empress dowager of Japan
- Tenure: 986–1000
- Born: 950; Heian Kyō (Kyōto)
- Died: January 10, 1000 (aged 49–50); Heian Kyō (Kyōto)
- Spouse: Emperor Reizei
- House: Imperial House of Japan
- Father: Emperor Suzaku
- Mother: Hiroko

Princess Masako (昌子内親王, Masako Naishinnō; 950 – 10 January, 1000), was a princess and an empress of Japan during the Heian period. She was the consort of her cousin Emperor Reizei of Japan. She was the daughter of Emperor Suzaku and Princess Hiroko.

== Biography ==
She was born in 950 after the abdication of her father. She was made princess on the 8th lunar month, 10th the same year. Her mother died soon after her birth. Her father the former Emperor Suzaku died at the age of 30 in 952. Then she was raised by her paternal uncle Emperor Murakami due to the early death of her parents.

She was made Empress consort after her cousin Prince Norihira acceded to the throne as Emperor Reizei in 967. She had no children.

After the abdication of Emperor Reizei, she was made Empress Dowager in the 7th lunar month, 973 and Grand Empress Dowager in the 7th lunar month, 986. She died from disease at the age of 50 on the 12th lunar month 1st, 999.

Japanese royalty
Preceded by Fujiwara no Anshi	Empress consort of Japan; 967–973	Succeeded by Fujiwara no Koshi
Preceded by Fujiwara no Anshi (granted title posthumously)	Empress dowager of Japan; 973–986	Succeeded by Fujiwara no Chikako (granted title posthumously)
Preceded by Fujiwara no Anshi (granted title posthumously)	Grand empress dowager of Japan; 986–1000	Succeeded by Fujiwara no Junshi
