= Fujiwara no Ikushi =

Empress of Japan from 1162 to 1173

Fujiwara no Ikushi 藤原育子

Empress consort of Japan
- Tenure: March 6, 1162 – September 23, 1173
- Born: 1146
- Died: September 23, 1173 (aged 26–27)
- Spouse: Emperor Nijō
- House: Imperial House of Japan
- Father: Tokudaiji Saneyoshi
- Mother: Minamoto no Toshiko (源俊子)

Fujiwara no Ikushi (藤原 育子; 1146 – September 23, 1173) was an empress consort of Japan. She was the consort of Emperor Nijō of Japan and foster mother of Emperor Rokujō.

In the same year of Emperor Rokujō's abdication, Fujiwara took tonsure as a Buddhist nun.

== Notes ==
Japanese royalty
Preceded by Princess Yoshiko	Empress consort of Japan; 1162–1173	Succeeded by Taira no Tokuko
