= Fujiwara no Kiyoko =

Empress consort of Japan
- Tenure: 1130–1141

Empress dowager of Japan
- Tenure: 1142–1150
- Born: 1122
- Died: 1182 (aged 59–60)
- Spouse: Emperor Sutoku
- House: Imperial House of Japan
- Father: Fujiwara no Tadamichi

Fujiwara no Kiyoko (藤原 聖子; 1122–1182), later Kōkamon'in (皇嘉門院), was an Empress consort of Japan as the consort of Emperor Sutoku.

== Biography ==
Her father the former regent Fujiwara no Tadamichi, who had ruled during Emperor Sutoku's childhood, and her mother was Fujiwara no Sōshi.

Kōkamonin had no children. She is known today for the cleverness of her strategies to ensure she controlled her own fortune and estates, despite the difficulty of doing so as woman (particularly a childless woman). Her brother acted as custodian, yet she retained power. With her wealth, she supported various religious projects, such as sponsoring Buddhist buildings, as well as paying for memorial services for her father.

Her husband, Emperor Sutoku, was forced to abdicate the throne and retire, living as a retired emperor. After the Hogen rebellion, in 1156, Sutoku was exiled; Kōkamon'in chose to remain in Jyoti and she was ordained as a Buddhist nun, receiving the Dharma name Seijōe (清浄恵). In 1164 she renewed her ordination and received the name Rengaku (蓮覚).

Her brother, Fujiwara no Kanezane, was a well-known statesman and author, who built religious halls in her honour.

== Notes ==
Japanese royalty
Preceded by Fujiwara no Tamako	Empress consort of Japan; 1130–1141	Succeeded by Fujiwara no Yasuko
Preceded by Fujiwara no Ishi (granted title posthumously)	Empress dowager of Japan; 1142–1150	Succeeded by Fujiwara no Tashi
