= Kaya-no-in =

Fujiwara no Yasuko

Empress consort of Japan
- Tenure: 1134–1139
- Born: 1095
- Died: 1156 (aged 60–61)
- Spouse: Emperor Toba
- House: Imperial House of Japan

Fujiwara no Taishi (藤原 泰子, also read Fujiwara no Yasuko; 1095–1156) was an Empress consort of Japan. She was the consort of Emperor Toba of Japan. Her birth name was Fujiwara no Kunshi (藤原 勲子), her ingō was Kaya-no-in (高陽院) and her dharma name upon entering religious orders in 1141 was Shōjōri (清浄理).

She became the consort of Emperor Toba in 1118. She was never given the title Empress during his reign. Her husband abdicated in 1123. In 1134, she was given the title Empress due to the influence of her family, despite the fact that her husband had abdicated a decade earlier.

== Notes ==
Japanese royalty
| Preceded by Fujiwara no Kiyoko | Empress consort of Japan; 1134–1139 | Succeeded by Fujiwara no Nariko |
