= Emperor Konoe =

Emperor of Japan from 1142 to 1155

Emperor Konoe 近衛天皇
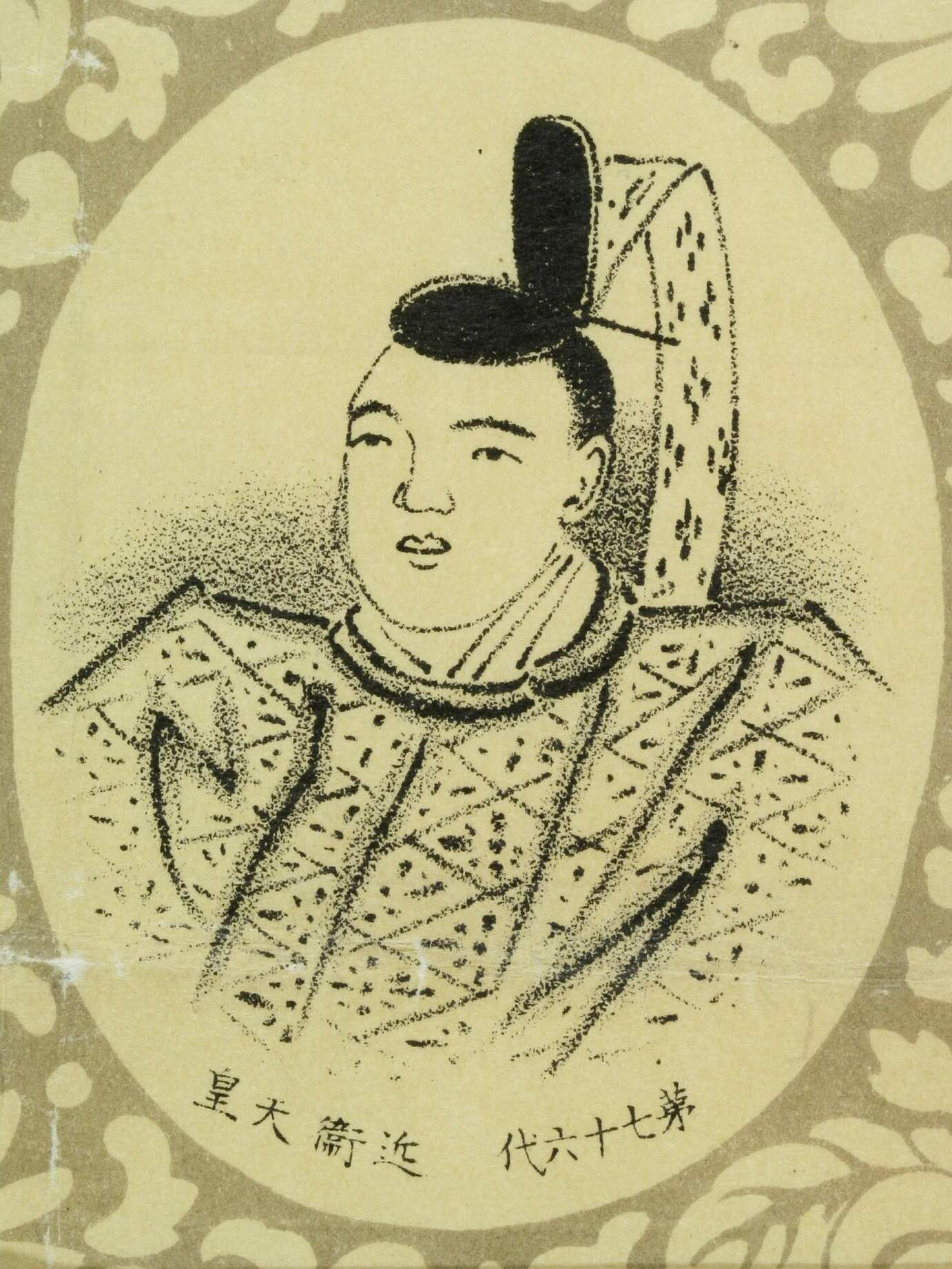
- Imaginary portrait by Kōtarō Miyake, c. 1894

Emperor of Japan
- Reign: January 5, 1142 – August 22, 1155
- Enthronement: January 25, 1142
- Predecessor: Sutoku
- Successor: Go-Shirakawa
- Born: June 16, 1139
- Died: August 22, 1155 (aged 16); Konoe-den palace (近衛殿)
- Burial: Anrakuju-in no minami no Misasagi (Kyoto)
- Spouses: Fujiwara no Tashi (m. 1150) Fujiwara no Shimeko (m. 1150)
Posthumous name
- Tsuigō: Emperor Konoe (近衛院 or 近衛天皇)
- House: Imperial House of Japan
- Father: Emperor Toba
- Mother: Fujiwara no Nariko

Emperor Konoe (近衛天皇, Konoe-tennō; June 16, 1139 – August 22, 1155) was the 76th emperor of Japan, according to the traditional order of succession.

Konoe's reign spanned the years from 1142 through 1155.

== Genealogy ==
Before his ascension to the Chrysanthemum Throne, his personal name (his imina) was Narihito-shinnō (体仁親王). He was also known as Tosihito-shinnō.

Emperor Konoe was the eighth son of Emperor Toba. His mother was Fujiwara no Nariko (1117–1160), the wife of Emperor Toba.

- Kōgō: Fujiwara no Tashi (藤原多子), Tokudaiji Kin'yoshi‘s daughter and Fujiwara no Yorinaga’s adopted daughter. Later married Emperor Nijo and become Emperor Rokujo’s foster mother.
- Chūgū: Fujiwara no Shimeko (藤原呈子) later Kujō-in (九条院), Fujiwara no Koremichi’s daughter and Fujiwara no Tadamichi’s adopted daughter.

== Events of Konoe's life ==
Konoe was named heir shortly after he was born in 1139; and he was proclaimed emperor at the age of 3.

- Eiji 1, in the 3rd month (1141): The former emperor Toba accepted the tonsure and became a Buddhist monk at the age of 39 years.
- Eiji 1, on the 7th day of the 12th month (永治元年; 1141): In the 18th year of Sutoku-tennō's reign (崇徳天皇十八年), the emperor abdicated; and the succession (senso) was received by a younger brother, the 8th son of former Emperor Toba. Shortly thereafter, Emperor Konoe is said to have acceded to the throne (sokui).

At that time, the Kampaku Fujiwara-no Tadamichi became Sesshō or regent. The Cloistered Emperor Toba continued to direct all the affairs of government, while the retired Emperor Sutoku had no powers. This conflict resulted in many controversies during Konoe's reign.

- Kōji 2, in the 1st month (1143): Cloistered Emperor Toba-in, now known by the title Daijō Hōō or Hōō (太上法皇), visited his mother.
- Kōji 2, in the 5th month (1143): Konoe passed his days praying at Tōdai-ji and also at the temples on Mount Hiei.
- Ten'yō gannen or Ten'yō 1, in the 7th month (1145): A comet was sighted in the sky; and for this reason, the name of the nengō was changed to Kyūan.
- Kyūan 1, in the 8th month (1145): The mother of former Emperor Sutoku (also known as "Taikenmon-In") died.
- Kyūan 2, in the 2nd month (1146), Konoe visited Toba-no-Hōō.
- Kyūan 2, in the 12th month (1146), Konoe joined in a celebration honoring Sesshō Fujiwara no Tadamichi (the regent) on his 58th birthday. This event was important because, in each sexagenary cycle, the first and the fifty-eighth years were considered to be auspicious according to Chinese astrological principles.
- Kyūan 4, in the 6th month (1148): The imperial palace was consumed by flames.
- Kyūan 6, in the 1st month (1150): Konoe assumed the role of a mature adult; and he married Fujiwara-no Tokoku, who had been raised by Sadaijin Yorinaga. This bride became Kōkōgō (皇皇后) or first empress.
- Kyūan 6, in the 3rd month (1150): Konoe married again, this time to "Feï-si," who had been raised by Sesshō Fujiwara-no Tadamichi. She was the daughter of Dainagon Fujiwara-no Koremichi. This bride became Chūgū (中宮) or second empress. Konoe was so very much enamoured of this second wife that he neglected his first wife, which caused discord in the kugyō, especially between Tadamichi and Yorinaga.
- Kyūan 6, in the 12th month (1150): Sesshō Minamoto-no Tadamichi, resigns his position and is named Daijō Daijin. In this same month, Minamoto-no Yoshikane became head of the Ashikaga clan in Shimotsuke Province.
- Ninpei 1, in the 1st month (1151): Sadaijin Yorinaga was given additional power as "Naï-ken," which gave him the duty and opportunity of reading formal written requests before they should be presented to the emperor. This had been amongst the powers of the Sesshō or the Kampaku. Factions in the court who favored Yorinaga tended to dislike Tadamichi, and they employed any means possible to help elevate Yorinaga's position. However, Yorinaga himself was generally disliked because of his capricious character. His tactics and strategy for enhancing his own prestige were focused primarily on diminishing Tadamichi's role in the court.
- Ninpei 2, on the 7th day of the 3rd month (1152): Konoe visited the home of Toba-no-Hōō to celebrate his father's 50th birthday; and the emperor stayed until the next day, amusing himself with dances and with listening to musical performances.
- Ninpei 3, on the 2nd day of the 1st month (1153): Konoe visited his father's home; and in the same month Taira-no Tadamori, the head of the criminal tribunal, died; and this position was soon filed by his son, Taira-no Kiyomori.
- Kyūju gannen or Kyūju 1, in the 5th month (1154): Udaijin Minamoto-no Masasada retired from public life to become a priest at age 61. He died several years later.
- Kyūju gannen or Kyūju 1, in the 8th month (1154): Fujiwara-no Saneyoshi, Grand General of the Right, was elevated to the role of Grand General of the Left; and the former Dainagon Fujiwara-no Kanenaga (aged 17) was elevated to take on the newly vacated role of Grand General of the Right.
- Kyūju 2, on the 23rd day of the 7th month (1155): Emperor Konoe died at the age of 17 years without leaving any heirs.
- Kyūju 2, on the 24th day of the 7th month (大同元年; 1155): In the 14th year of Konoe-tennō's reign (近衛天皇14年), the emperor died; and despite an ensuring dispute over who should follow him as sovereign, contemporary scholars then construed that the succession (enso) was received by a younger brother, the 14th son of former-Emperor Toba. Shortly thereafter, Emperor Go-Shirakawa is said to have acceded to the throne (sokui).

During Konoe's reign, the Enshō (Superiority of Duration) Temple. After this, successive emperors no longer build Imperial-prayer temples.

Emperor Konoe's reign lasted for 13 years: 2 years in the nengō Kōji, 1 year in Ten'yō, 6 years in Kyūan, 3 years in Ninpei, and 2 years in Kyūju.

=== Kugyō ===
Kugyō (公卿) is a collective term for the very few most powerful men attached to the court of the Emperor of Japan in pre-Meiji eras.

In general, this elite group included only three to four men at a time. These were hereditary courtiers whose experience and background would have brought them to the pinnacle of a life's career. During Konoe's reign, this apex of the Daijō-kan included:

- Sesshō, Fujiwara Tadamichi, 1099–1164.
- Daijō-daijin, Sanjō Saneyuki, 1079–1162.
- Sadaijin, Fujiwara Yorinaga, 1120–1156.
- Sadaijin, Minamoto Arihito, 1103–1147.
- Udaijin, Sanjō Saneyuki, 1079–1162.
- Udaijin, Minamoto Arihito, 1103–1147.
- Nadaijin, Minamoto Arihito, 1103–1147.

== Eras of Konoe's reign ==
The years of Konoe's reign are more specifically identified by more than one era name or nengō.

- Kōji (1142–1144)
- Ten'yō (1144–1145)
- Kyūan (1145–1151)
- Ninpei (1151–1154)
- Kyūju (1154–1156)

== Ancestry ==
Ancestors of Emperor Konoe

8. Emperor Shirakawa (1053-1130)
4.Emperor Horikawa (1079-1107)
9. Fujiwara no Kenshi (1057-1084)
2. Emperor Toba (1103-1156)
10.Fujiwara no Sanesue (1035-1092)
5. Fujiwara no Ishi (1076-1103)
11.Fujiwara no Mutsuko
1. Emperor Konoe
12. Fujiwara no Akisue (1055-1123)
6. Fujiwara no Nagazane (1075-1133)
13. Fujiwara
3. Fujiwara no Nariko (1117-1160)
14. Minamoto no Toshifusa (1035-1121)
7. Minamoto no Masako (1066-1152)

== See also ==
- Emperor of Japan
- List of Emperors of Japan
- Imperial cult

== Notes ==
Japanese Imperial kamon — a stylized chrysanthemum blossom

Regnal titles
Preceded by Emperor Sutoku	Emperor of Japan: Emperor Konoe; 1142–1155	Succeeded by Emperor Go-Shirakawa
