= Fujiwara no Yorinaga =

Japanese noble

- 藤原 頼長
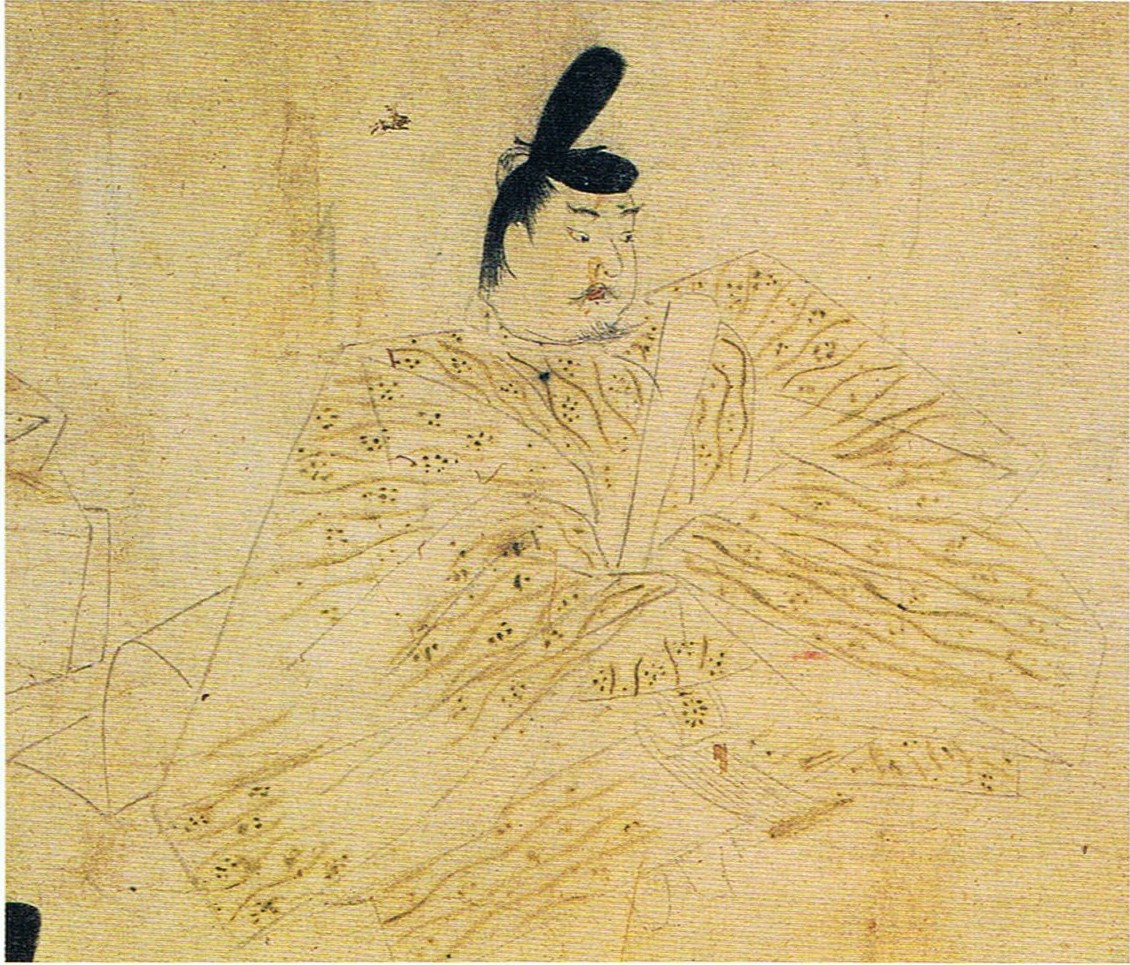
- Born: 1120
- Died: September 1, 1156 (aged 36)
- Children: Fujiwara no Moronaga (son); Fujiwara no Kanenaga (son); Fujiwara no Masuko (adopted daughter)
- Father: Fujiwara no Tadazane
- Relatives: Fujiwara no Tadamichi (brother)

Fujiwara no Yorinaga (藤原 頼長; May 1120 – August 1, 1156) was a Japanese statesman and a member of the Fujiwara clan who was highly significant in determining the course of 12th century Japanese political history.

== Early life ==
Born in 1120, Yorinaga had a turbulent youth. He later wrote that he did not listen to his elders and would spend most of his time roaming through the country, hawking and hunting - he said he still bore the scars of these expeditions at the time of writing. Despite this, he did proceed to begin studying, particularly the classics of Chinese literature and Confucianism, as well as Indian logic. He read little or no native Japanese works, however, and was later notable for never composing a poem in Japanese. He was the favourite son of his father, Tadazane.

== Career ==
Yorinaga ascended quickly through the political ranks, achieving the formidable office of Minister of the Right (Udaijin) by the age of 17. In 1150, he was appointed Minister of the Left, or Sadaijin, the highest rank under the Chancellor and the Regent himself. He married his daughter to Emperor Konoe in the same year.

Yorinaga was a determined defender of the Fujiwara Regency, known for his courageous and obstinate opposition to the 'new men' of the Insei system, though he appreciated the necessity of reforming the Regency. He implemented various political reforms during his career: for example, during his term as Sadaijin he reviewed defunct Court practices and observations, viewing them as a deplorable lapse in officials' discipline.

He was known for being overly firm and direct, even impetuous. The Gukanshō termed him as the finest scholar in Japan, but possessed of rash temperament. Some scholars have suggested that this was due to his lack of knowledge of Japanese literature and hence of native sentiment – his attitude was at odds with that of the easygoing Heian court. His opponents called him the Aku Safu, or 'Wicked Minister of the Left', due to his passionate reform and strength of character.

Konoe's death in 1155 resulted in a hard-fought succession dispute. Yorinaga and his brother, Tadamichi, were divided over the issue. Bifukumon-In asserted her daughter's right to the Throne, but Japanese society was no longer accepting of a female sovereign, and nothing resulted from the claim. Tadamichi was triumphant, and the Emperor Toba's son, Go-Shirakawa, succeeded to the Throne. Yorinaga then asked to tutor the heir apparent, a reasonable request given his academic standing, but was denied.

== Hogen Insurrection ==
Both of them insulted by Go-Shirakawa's faction, Yorinaga joined with Sutoku, one of Toba’s other sons, in opposition to him. Successfully gathering several hundred soldiers from adjacent provinces, they marched on the capital. They successfully captured the city and readied defences to repel a counter-attack. Go-Shirakawa had the support of the two foremost warrior clans of the day, the Minamoto and the Taira – consequently, his forces vastly outnumbered those of Yorinaga and Sutoku. The ensuing battle took place during the night. After heavy fighting, Yorinaga and Sutoku's defensive position was destroyed by fire. Yorinaga was killed, along with fifty of Sutoku's important supporters. The rest of their allies surrendered.

This defeat symbolised the true end of the Fujiwara's power over the capital and the rise of the warrior clans. It had been they who decided the outcome of the succession dispute, and their importance would only continue to grow for the next several centuries.

== Family ==
He had two sons: Fujiwara no Moronaga (1138–1192), who served as Daijo-daijin, and Fujiwara no Kanenaga (1138–1158). He also adopted the daughter of Fujiwara no Kin'yoshi, Fujiwara no Masuko.

== Sexuality ==
Fujiwara no Yorinaga's personal diary, the Taiki (台記), covering the years 1136–1155, is an important primary source for the study of male same-sex relationships among the aristocracy of late Heian period Japan. The diary contains numerous descriptions of sexual encounters with men, including fellow courtiers and individuals of lower social standing. According to a study by Ōishi, 59 sexual encounters are recorded in the diary, of which 56 involved men, one involved a woman, and two did not specify the sex of the partner. A copy of the diary is held at the Historiographical Institute of the University of Tokyo.

Yorinaga's relationships included men from different levels of the court hierarchy, ranging from high-ranking aristocrats to lower-ranking attendants and servants. The historian Tōno Haruyuki examined these relationships and their social significance, noting the diversity of Yorinaga's partners. He had a physical relationship with many aristocratic men such as Fujiwara no Narichika,

Among Yorinaga's partners was his retainer Hata no Kimiharu, with whom he maintained a long-term sexual relationship. According to the historian Paul Schalow, the Taiki indicates that Yorinaga was deeply affected by Kimiharu's premature death. Their relationship was also remembered in the thirteenth-century literary collection Ima monogatari, compiled by Fujiwara no Nobuzane.

Scholars have interpreted Yorinaga's sexual relationships as part of the political and social networks of the late Heian court. Reginald Jackson argues that these encounters functioned partly as a form of political diplomacy, helping Yorinaga establish and maintain alliances with influential men. Such relationships existed alongside marriage and the pursuit of political advantage through children and family connections.

The historian Gomi Fumihiko has emphasised the close relationship between sexuality and political power in Yorinaga's milieu, cautioning against interpreting these practices exclusively through modern conceptions of sexual identity. Jackson similarly argues that the relationships described in the Taiki cannot be understood simply in terms of a fixed homosexual identity, since male same-sex intimacy could also serve political and social purposes.

Yorinaga's diary provides important evidence for the place of male same-sex relationships in late Heian aristocratic society. Historian Joshua S. Mostow identifies the late Heian period as a time when non-pederastic male same-sex relationships became particularly visible in surviving historical records.
