= Fujiwara no Tadamichi =

Japanese noble (1097–1164)

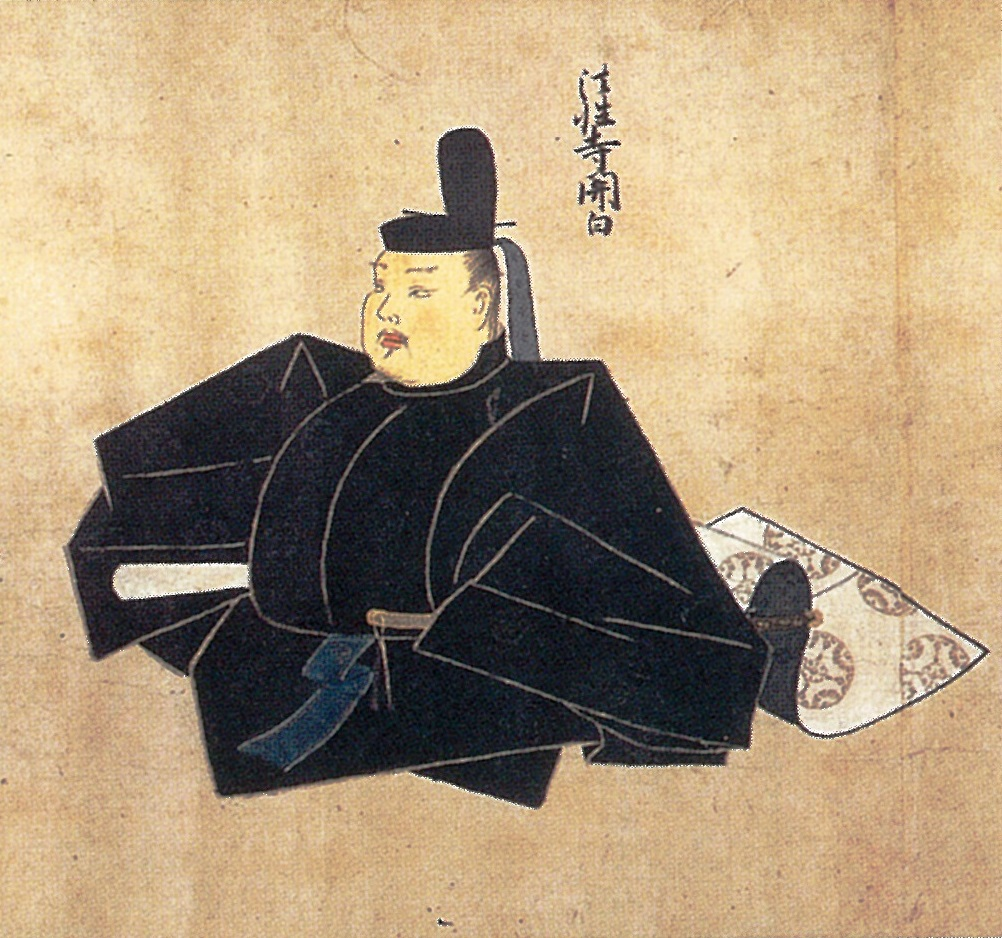
Fujiwara no Tadamichi (from Tennō Sekkan Daijin Eizukan)

Fujiwara no Tadamichi (藤原 忠通; March 15, 1097 – March 13, 1164) was the eldest son of the Japanese regent (Kampaku) Fujiwara no Tadazane and a member of the politically powerful Fujiwara clan. He was the father of Fujiwara no Kanefusa and Jien.

In the Hōgen Rebellion of 1156, Tadamichi sided with the Emperor Go-Shirakawa, while his brother Fujiwara no Yorinaga sided with Emperor Sutoku.

In 1162, he ordained as a Buddhist monk and took the Dharma name Enkan (円観).

== Marriage and Children ==
Parents

- Father: Fujiwara no Tadazane (藤原 忠実, 1078 – 1162)
- Mother: Minamoto no Moroko (源師子), daughter of Minamoto no Akifusa (源顕房)

Consort and issue:

- Wife: Fujiwara no Soshi (藤原宗子, 1190 – 1155), daughter of Fujiwara no Munemichi (藤原宗通)
  - Fujiwara no Kiyoko (藤原 聖子; 1122–1182), Wife of Emperor Sutoku, first daughter
  - Third son (d.1127)
- Wife: Minamoto no Nobuko (源信子), daughter of Minamoto no Norinobu (源国信)
  - Konoe Motozane (近衛 基実, 1143 – August 23, 1166), fourth son
- Wife: Minamoto no Toshiko (源俊子), daughter of Minamoto no Norinobu (源国信), younger sister of Nobuko
  - Fujiwara no Motofusa (藤原 基房, 1144 – February 1, 1230), fifth son
  - Shinen (1153 – 1224), ninth son
  - Saichu, thirteenth son
- Wife: Minamoto no Toshiko (源俊子), daughter of Minamoto no Akitoshi (源顕俊)
  - Fujiwara no Ikushi (藤原 育子; 1146 – September 23, 1173), Wife of Emperor Nijō, second daughter
- Wife: Kaga no Tsubone (加賀局), daughter of Fujiwara no Nakamitsu (藤原仲光)
  - Fujiwara no Kanezane (藤原 兼実, 1149 – May 3, 1207), sixth son
  - Doen (1151–1170), eight son
  - Fujiwara no Kanefusa (藤原 兼房, 1153 – March 30, 1217), tenth son
  - Jien (慈円, 17 May 1155 in Kyoto – 28 October 1225), eleventh son
- Wife: Daughter of Fujiwara no Motonobu (藤原基信)
  - Eshin (恵信, 1114 – 1171), first son
- Wife: Lady Gōjō (五条), daughter of Minamoto no Moritsune (源盛経)
  - Takadata (尊忠; b.1150), seventh son
- Wife Unknown
  - Kakuchu (覚忠; 1118 – 1177), Priest, second son
