= Fujiwara no Atsushige =

Japanese nobleman and poet

Fujiwara no Atsushige (藤原 篤茂; dates unknown, but active in the tenth century) was a Japanese nobleman and kanshi (classical Chinese) poet of the Heian period.

== Biography ==
The poet Fujiwara no Atsushige was the son of Yorinari (遂業), the governor of Bichū Province. His date of birth is unknown, but he was active around the mid-10th century. At some point in the Tenryaku era (947–957) he passed the civil service exam, and after serving in such positions as vice-governor of Tanba province (丹波介) he attained to the post of Zusho-no-kami (図書頭), head of the Zusho-ryō, a government agency responsible for compiling histories. (Note: This information comes from the genealogical work Sonpi Bunmyaku and other sources.)

Tentoku Sannen Hachigatsu Jūrokunichi Tōshi Gyōji Ryakki (天徳三年八月十六日闘詩行事略記) records that on the 16th day of the eighth month of Tentoku 3 (21 September 959 in the Julian calendar) he was in attendance on the Team of the Right in a poetry event, and that he was at that time an assistant palace secretary (少内記 shōnaiki). The Fusō Ryakki indicates that two years later, in the third month of Tentoku 5, he contributed poetry to a blossom-viewing banquet at the tsuridono of the Reizei-in.

In Ōwa 3 (963), he took part in a poetry competition at the residence of Miyoshi Michimune (三善道統), the Zen Shūsai-taku Shi-awase (善秀才宅詩合), where he was selected to act as a judge. Later, he was awarded the Junior Fifth Rank, Upper Grade, but he bemoaned his having spent a decade at the Zusho-ryō and stagnating in the Fifth Rank, and so made a request to be assigned the governorship of Awaji Province. (Note: Book VI of the Honchō Monsui.)

In Kōhō 3 (966), he was in attendance at Prince Morihira's poetry banquet for the reading of the Commentary on the Classic of Filial Poetry.

It is unknown when Atsushige died.

== Poetry ==
There is evidence in early sources that Atsushige's poetry was highly regarded in its time, but very few specimens survive. What is extant was included in anthologies such as the Wakan Rōei-shū and the Shinsen Rōei-shū, compiled in the early 11th and early 12th centuries, respectively.
