= Emperor Ichijō =

Emperor of Japan from 986 to 1011

Emperor Ichijō 一条天皇
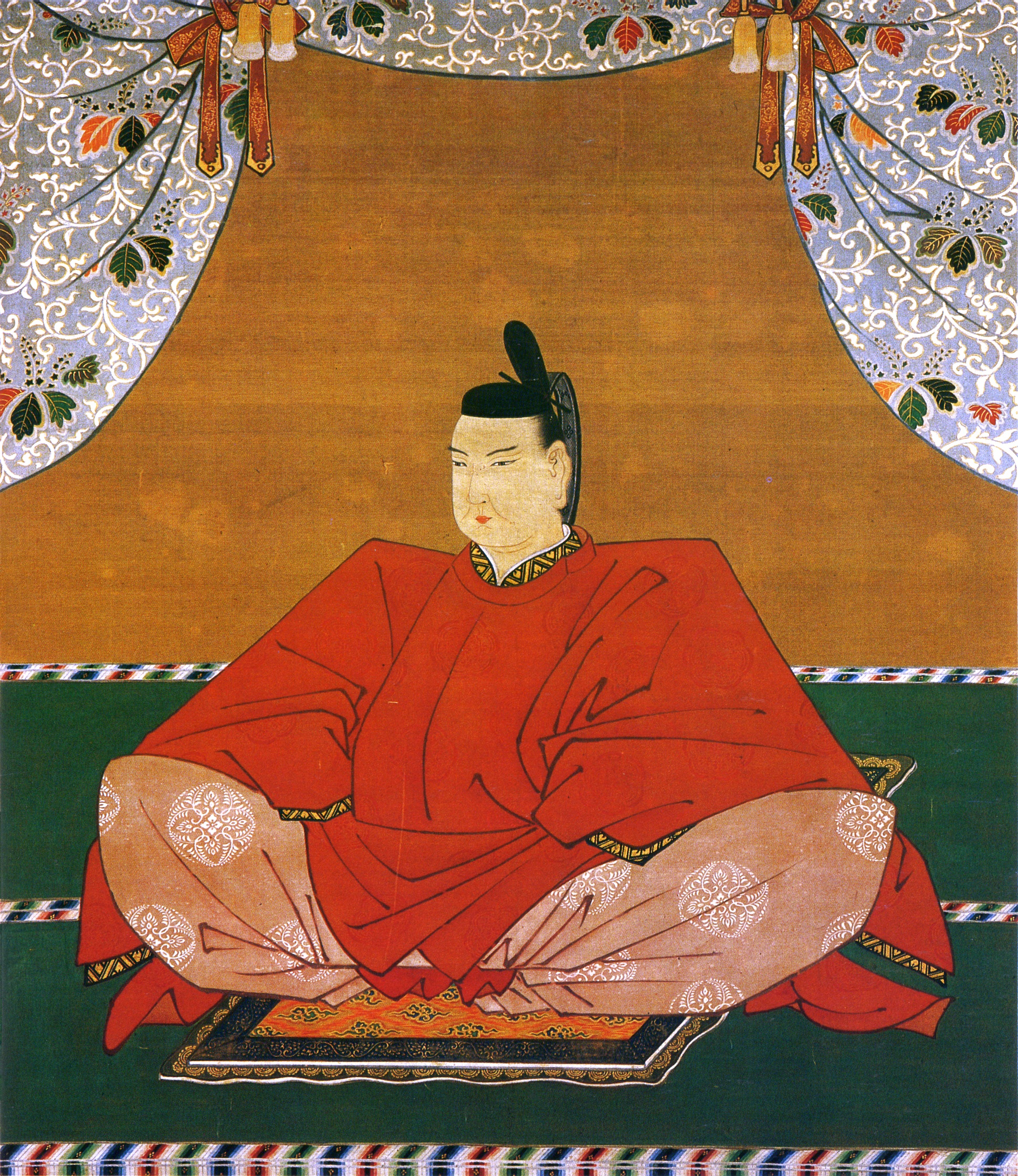

Emperor of Japan
- Reign: July 31, 986 – July 16, 1011
- Enthronement: August 1, 986
- Predecessor: Kazan
- Successor: Sanjō
- Born: July 15, 980; Higashi Sanjo Palace (東三条第)
- Died: July 25, 1011 (aged 31); Ichijō-in chuden (一条院中殿)
- Burial: En'yū-ji no kita no misasagi (圓蝠寺北陵) (Kyoto)
- Spouses: Fujiwara no Teishi (m. 990; died 1001) Fujiwara no Shōshi (m. 1000)
- Issue: Princess Shushi; Prince Atsuyasu; Princess Bishi; Emperor Go-Ichijō; Emperor Go-Suzaku
Posthumous name
- Tsuigō: Emperor Ichijō (一条院 or 一条天皇)
- House: Imperial House of Japan
- Father: Emperor En'yū
- Mother: Fujiwara no Senshi

Emperor Ichijō (一条天皇, Ichijō-tennō; July 15, 980 – July 25, 1011) was the 66th emperor of Japan, according to the traditional order of succession.

Ichijō's reign spanned the years from 986 to 1011.

== Biography ==
Before he ascended to the Chrysanthemum Throne, his personal name (imina) was Yasuhito-shinnō (懐仁). Kanehito-shinnō was the first son of Emperor En'yū and Fujiwara no Senshi, a daughter of Fujiwara no Kaneie. Since there are no documented siblings, it is supposed that he was an only child.

Ichijō had five Empresses or Imperial consorts and five Imperial sons and daughters.

== Events of Ichijō's life ==
His reign coincided with the culmination of Heian period culture and the apex of the power of the Fujiwara clan. He ascended to the throne after a period of political instability that began within the Fujiwara clan after they successfully eliminated the Minamoto clan as a political rival. The internal power struggle that ensued within the Fujiwara saw the untimely ends of three emperors. Ichijō had been appointed crown prince under Emperor Kazan in 984. Two years later, after Emperor Kazan abdicated in 986, Ichijō ascended to the throne at the age of six. The young Emperor Ichijō was under the influence of his uncle Fujiwara no Michinaga from the start of his reign, though Michinaga's true ascent to political dominance did not begin until 995 after the deaths of his older brothers and the exile of his political rival and nephew, Korechika.

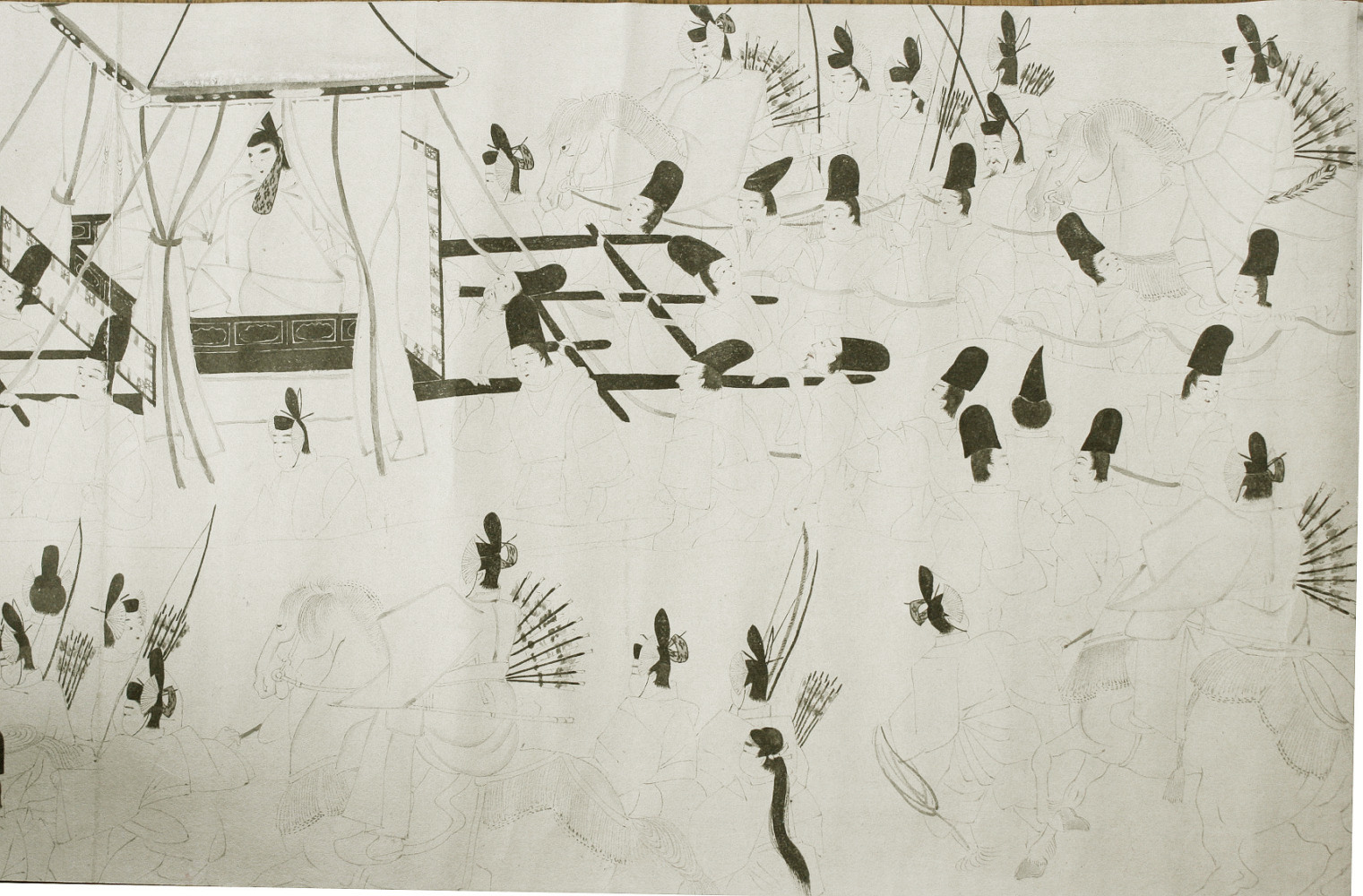
In October of the first year of Chōtoku (995), Emperor Ichijō made a visit to Iwashimizu Hachiman Shrine. On his return, Emperor Ichijō stopped his palanquin and greeted his mother, Senshi, who was watching the procession from a viewing platform.

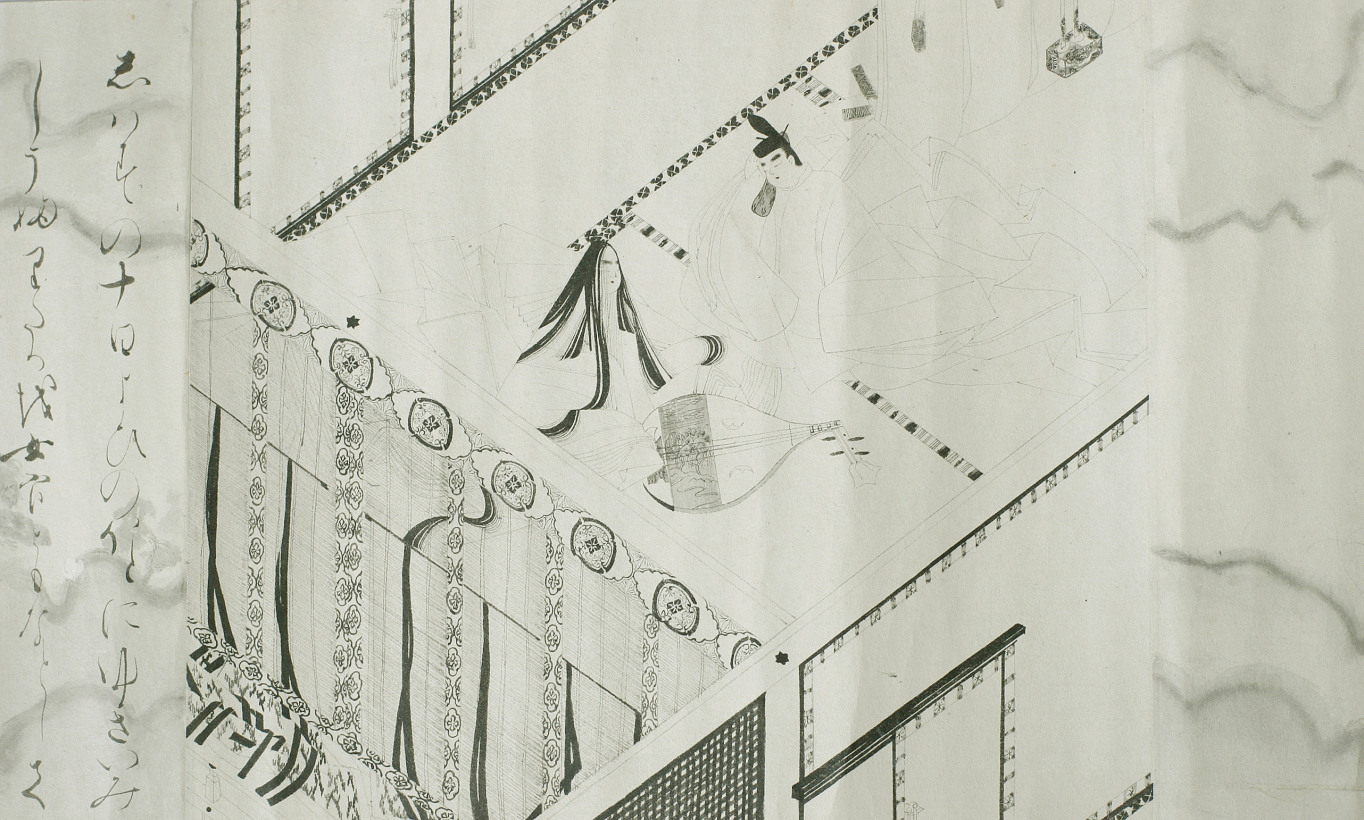
Emperor Ichijo visits Empress Teishi playing biwa.

These events took place during the Kanna era (see Japanese era name nengō 年号), after Emperor Kazan abdicated. The succession (senso) was received by a cousin, the son of his father's younger brother.

- August 1, 986 (Kanna 2, 23rd day of the 6th month): Emperor Ichijō is said to have acceded to the throne (sokui).

A son of Emperor Reizei, who was older than Ichijō, was appointed crown prince. Kaneie became the regent (Sesshō) and effectively ruled the state. After Kaneie died in 990, his first son and Ichijō's uncle Fujiwara no Michitaka was appointed regent.

- March 1, 991 (Shōryaku 2, 12th day of the 2nd month): The former-Emperor En'yū died at the age of 33.
- 1008 (Kankō 5, 8th day of the 2nd month): Kazan died at the age of 41.
- July 16, 1011 (Kankō 8, 13th day of the 6th month): In the 25th year of Emperor Ichijō's reign (一条天皇二十五年), the emperor abdicated; and the succession (senso) was received by his cousin. Shortly thereafter, Emperor Sanjō is said to have acceded to the throne (sokui).
- July 19, 1011 (Kankō 8, 16th day of the 6th month): Emperor Ichijō takes tonsure as a Buddhist monk.
- July 25, 1011 (Kankō 8, 22nd day of the 6th month): Emperor Ichijō died.

The mother of the emperor had a large influence over the appointment of officials, "the emperor's officials controls matters of the state, as the imperial mother makes affairs of the court solely her own."

Ichijō had two empress consorts. First was Teishi (or Fujiwara no Sadako), a daughter of Fujiwara no Michitaka. Second was Shōshi (or Akiko), a daughter of Fujiwara no Michinaga, a younger brother of Michitaka. Most people thought it impossible to have two empress consorts, but Michinaga claimed that the empress held two separate titles, Chūgū and Kōgō, which were different in principle and could therefore given to two different women.

The courts of both empresses were known as centers of culture. Sei Shōnagon, author of The Pillow Book, was a lady in waiting to Teishi. Murasaki Shikibu was a lady in waiting to Shoshi. There were other famous poets in the courts of the empresses.

Ichijō loved literature and music. For this reason, high ranked courtiers felt the necessity for their daughter to hold cultural salons with many skillful lady poets. Particularly he was fond of the flute. Ichijō was known for his temperate character and was beloved by his subjects.

During Ichijō's reign, Imperial visits were first made to the following four shrines: Kasuga, Ōharano, Matsunoo, and Kitano; and in the years which followed, Emperors traditionally made yearly Imperial visits to these shrines and to three others: Kamo, Iwashimizu and Hirano.

Decorative emblems (kiri) of the Hosokawa clan are found at Ryōan-ji. Ichijō is entombed near what had been the residence of Hosokawa Katsumoto before the Ōnin War.

The actual site of Ichijō's grave is known. This emperor is traditionally venerated at a memorial Shinto shrine (misasagi) at Kyoto.

The Imperial Household Agency designates this location as Ichijō's mausoleum. It is formally named En'yū-ji no kita no misasagi.

Ichijō is buried amongst the "Seven Imperial Tombs" at Ryōan-ji Temple in Kyoto. The mound which commemorates the Emperor Ichijō is today named Kinugasa-yama. The emperor's burial place would have been quite humble in the period after Ichijo died.

These tombs reached their present state as a result of the 19th century restoration of imperial sepulchers (misasagi) which were ordered by Emperor Meiji.

=== Kugyō ===
Kugyō (公卿) is a collective term for the very few most powerful men attached to the court of the Emperor of Japan in pre-Meiji eras.

In general, this elite group included only three to four men at a time. These were hereditary courtiers whose experience and background have brought them to the pinnacle of a life's career.

During Kazan's reign, this apex of the Daijō-kan included:

- Sesshō, Fujiwara no Kaneie (藤原兼家), 929–990.
- Sesshō, Fujiwara no Michitaka (藤原道隆), 953–995.
- Kampaku, Fujiwara no Kaneie.
- Kampaku, Fujiwara no Michikane, 961–995.
- Daijō-daijin, Fujiwara no Kaneie.
- Daijō-daijin, Fujiwara no Yoritada (藤原頼忠), 924–989.
- Daijō-daijin, Fujiwara no Tamemitsu(藤原為光), 942–992.
- Sadaijin, Fujiwara no Michinaga (藤原道長), 966–1027.
- Udaijin, Fujiwara no Michikane (藤原道兼).
- Naidaijin, Fujiwara no Michitaka.
- Naidaijin, Fujiwara no Korechika (藤原伊周), 973–1010.
- Naidaijin, Kan'in Kinsue (藤原公季), 956–1029.
- Dainagon

== Eras of Ichijō's reign ==
The years of Ichijō's reign are more specifically identified by more than one era name or nengō.

- Eien (987–988)
- Eiso (988–990)
- Shōryaku (990–995)
- Chōtoku (995–999)
- Chōhō (999–1004)
- Kankō (1004–1012)

== Consorts and children ==
- Empress (Kōgō): Fujiwara no Teishi/Sadako (藤原定子), Fujiwara no Michitaka‘s 1st daughter
  - First Daughter: Imperial Princess Shushi/Nagako (脩子内親王; 997–1049)
  - First son: Imperial Prince Atsuyasu (敦康親王; 999–1019)
  - Second Daughter: Imperial Princess Bishi (媄子内親王; 1001–1008)
- Empress (Chūgū): Fujiwara no Shōshi/Akiko (藤原彰子) later Jōtō-mon-In (上東門院), Fujiwara no Michinaga‘s daughter
  - Second son: Imperial Prince Atsuhira (敦成親王) later Emperor Go-Ichijō
  - Third son: Imperial Prince Atsunaga (敦良親王) later Emperor Go-Suzaku
- Consort (Nyōgo): Fujiwara no Gishi (藤原義子; 974–1053), Fujiwara no Kinsue‘s daughter
- Consort (Nyōgo): Fujiwara no Genshi (藤原元子; b.979), Fujiwara no Akimitsu‘s daughter; later married Minamoto no Yorisada
- Consort (Nyōgo): Fujiwara no Sonshi (藤原尊子; 984–1022), Fujiwara no Michikane‘s daughter; later married Fujiwara no Michitō in 1015
- Consort (Mikushige-dono-no-Bettō): Fujiwara no Michitaka‘s 4th daughter (985–1002)

== Ancestry ==
Ancestors of Emperor Ichijō

8. Emperor Daigo (885-930)
4. Emperor Murakami (926-967)
9. Fujiwara no Onshi (885-954)
2. Emperor En'yū (959-991)
10. Fujiwara no Morosuke (909-960)
5. Fujiwara no Anshi (927-964)
11. Fujiwara no Seishi (d. 943)
1. Emperor Ichijō
12.Fujiwara no Morosuke (909-960)
6. Fujiwara no Kaneie (929-990)
13. Fujiwara no Seishi (d. 943)
3. Fujiwara no Senshi (962-1002)
14. Fujiwara no Nakamasa
7. Fujiwara no Tokihime (d. 980)
15. Tachibana no Iwako

== Notes ==
Japanese Imperial kamon — a stylized chrysanthemum blossom

== See also ==
- Emperor of Japan
- List of Emperors of Japan
- Imperial cult
- Emperor Go-Ichijō
- Seimei Shrine

Regnal titles
| Preceded by Emperor Kazan | Emperor of Japan: Ichijō; 986–1011 | Succeeded by Emperor Sanjō |
