= Emperor Kazan =

Emperor of Japan from 984 to 986

Emperor Kazan 花山天皇
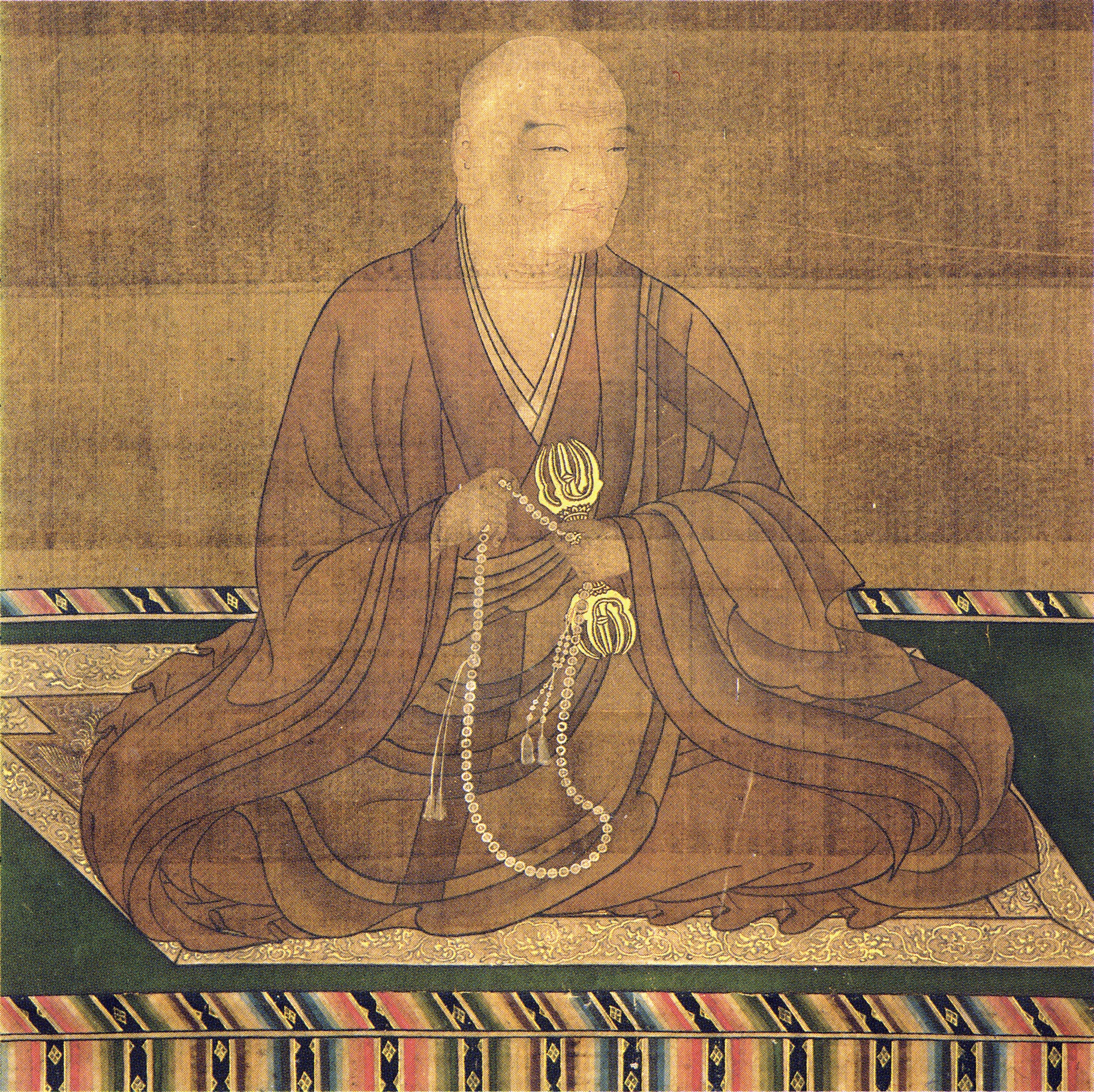

Emperor of Japan
- Reign: September 24, 984 – August 1, 986
- Enthronement: November 5, 984
- Predecessor: En'yū
- Successor: Ichijō
- Born: November 29, 968; Heian Kyō (Kyōto)
- Died: March 17, 1008 (aged 39); Kazan-in palace (花山院)
- Burial: Kamiyagawa no hotori no misasagi (紙屋川上陵) (Kyoto)
- Issue more...: Prince Kiyohito; Prince Akinori; Kakugen; Shinkan
Posthumous name
- Tsuigō: Emperor Kazan (花山院 or 花山天皇)
- House: Imperial House of Japan
- Father: Emperor Reizei
- Mother: Fujiwara no Kaishi

Emperor Kazan (花山天皇, Kazan-tennō; November 29, 968 – March 17, 1008) was the 65th emperor of Japan, according to the traditional order of succession.

Kazan's reign spanned the years from 984 through 986.

== Biography ==
Before his ascension to the Chrysanthemum Throne, his personal name (imina) was Morosada-shinnō (師貞親王).

Morasada was the eldest son of Emperor Reizei. The prince's mother was Fujiwara no Kaneko/Kaishi (藤原懐子), who was a daughter of sesshō Fujiwara no Koretada. Morasada was also the brother of Emperor Sanjō.

== Events of Kazan's life ==
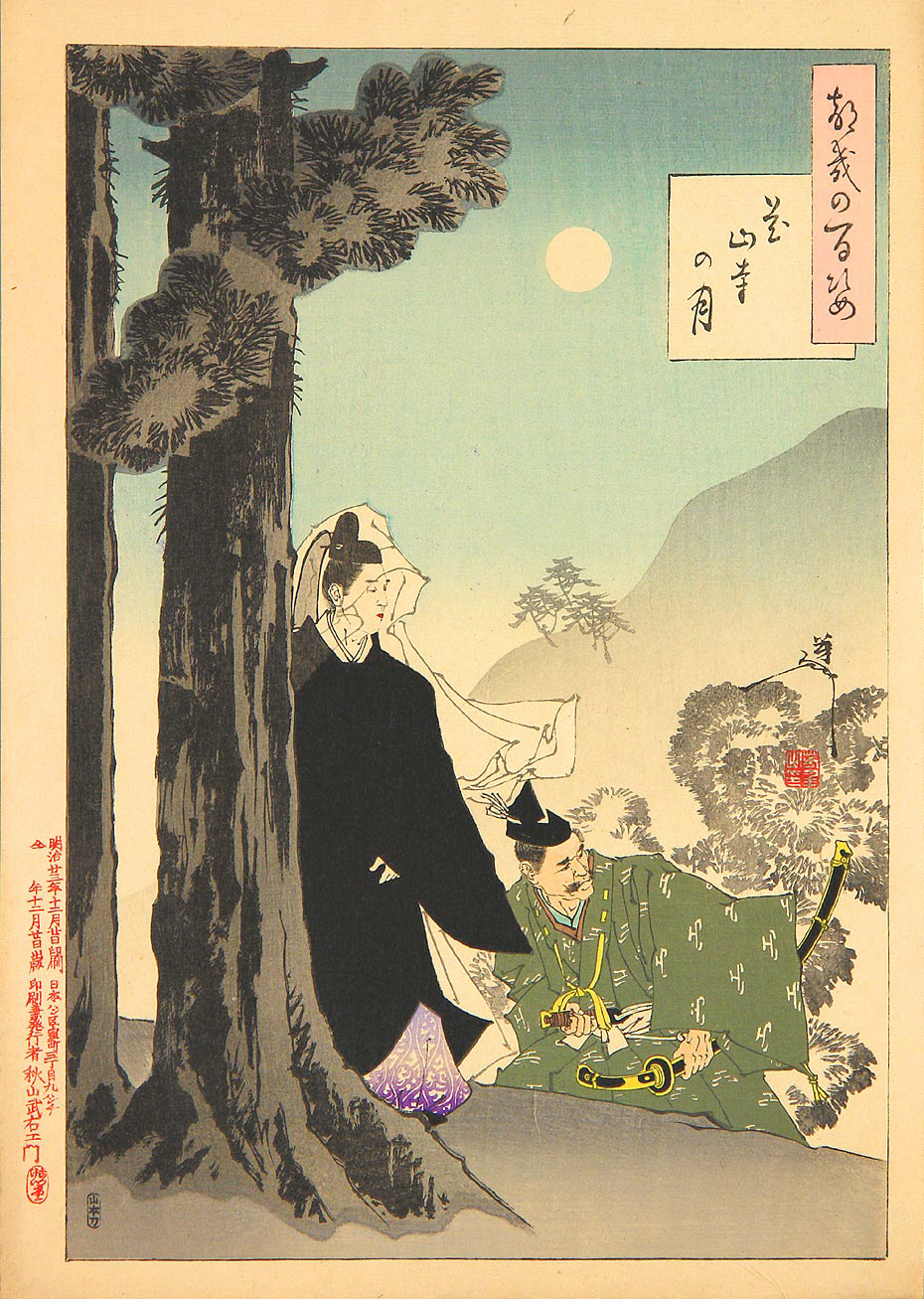
Emperor Kazan, who was fooled into abdicating, on his way to the temple where he will become a Buddhist monk – woodblock print by Yoshitoshi Tsukioka (1839–1892)

Prince Morasada was seventeen years of age at the time of the succession.

- October 6, 984 (Eikan 1, 27th day of the 8th month): In the 15th year of Emperor En'yu's reign (円融天皇十五年), he abdicated; and the succession (senso) was received by a nephew. Shortly thereafter, Emperor Kazan is said to have acceded to the throne (sokui).

He commissioned the Shūi Wakashū.

- 985 (Kanna 1, 4th month): Fujiwara no Tokiakira and his brother, Yasusuke, contended with Fujiwara no Sukitaka and Ōe-no Masahira in a sword fight in Kyoto. Masahira lost the fingers of his left hand. The two brothers fled; and after careful searching, Tokiakira was eventually located in Ōmi Province.

He faced a tough political struggle from the Fujiwara family; and at the age of nineteen, he was manipulated into abandoning the throne by Fujiwara no Kaneie. Kaneie told him that Ichijo (Kaneie's maternal grandson) already held the Regalia, and that there was no purpose in Kazan continuing to rule. Under some pressure, Kazan acquiesced, and went to the Gangyō-ji temple. He was accompanied by Kaneie's second son, Michikane, who was also to enter religion. When they arrived, however, Michikane said he would like to see his parents one final time while he was still a layman. Michikane never came back.

- 986 (Kanna 2, 6th month): Kazan abdicated, and took up residence at Gangyō-ji where he became a Buddhist monk; and his new priestly name was Nyūkaku.
- August 23, 986 (Kanna 2, 16th day of the 7th month): Iyasada-shinnō was appointed as heir and crown prince at age 11. This followed the convention that two imperial lineages took the throne in turn, although Emperor Ichijō was in fact Iyasada's junior. He thus gained the nickname Sakasa-no moke-no kimi (the imperial heir in reverse). When Emperor Kanzan abandoned the world for holy orders, one grandson of Kaneie ascended to the throne as Emperor Ichijō (the 66th sovereign); and in due course, another grandson would follow on the throne as Emperor Sanjō (the 67th sovereign).

Nyūkaku went on various pilgrimages and 're-founded' the Saigoku Kannon Pilgrimage, which was established in the early 8th century by a monk named Tokudo Shonin. This pilgrimage involves travelling to 33 locations across the eight provinces of the Western Japan.

Decorative emblems (kiri) of the Hosokawa clan are found at Ryōan-ji. Kazan is amongst six other emperors entombed near what had been the residence of Hosokawa Katsumoto before the Ōnin War.

Daijō-tennō Kazan died at the age of 41 on the 8th day of the 2nd month of the fifth year of Kankō (1008).

The actual site of Kazan's grave is known. This emperor is traditionally venerated at a memorial Shinto shrine (misasagi) at Kyoto.

The Imperial Household Agency designates this location as Kazan's mausoleum. It is formally named Kamiya no hotori no misasagi.

He is buried amongst the "Seven Imperial Tombs" at Ryōan-ji Temple in Kyoto. The mound which commemorates the Hosokawa Emperor Kazan is today named Kinugasa-yama. The emperor's burial place would have been quite humble in the period after Kazan died. These tombs reached their present state as a result of the 19th century restoration of imperial sepulchers (misasagi) which were ordered by Emperor Meiji.

=== Kugyō ===
Kugyō (公卿) is a collective term for the very few most powerful men attached to the court of the Emperor of Japan in pre-Meiji eras.

In general, this elite group included only three to four men at a time. These were hereditary courtiers whose experience and background have brought them to the pinnacle of a life's career. During Kazan's reign, this apex of the Daijō-kan included:

- Kampaku, Fujiwara no Yoritada, 924–989.
- Daijō-daijin, Fujiwara no Yoritada.
- Sadaijin, Fujiwara no Kaneie, 929–990.
- Naidaijin (not appointed)
- Dainagon

== Eras of Kazan's reign ==
The years of Kazan's reign are more specifically identified by more than one era name or nengō.

- Eikan (983–985)
- Kanna (985–986)

== Consorts and children ==
Consort (Nyōgo): Fujiwara no Shishi (藤原忯子; 969–985), Fujiwara no Tamemitsu’s daughter

Consort (Nyōgo): Fujiwara no Teishi (藤原諟子; d.1035), Fujiwara no Yoritada’s daughter

Consort (Nyōgo): Fujiwara no Chōshi (藤原姚子; 971–989), Fujiwara no Asateru's daughter

Consort (Nyōgo): Princess Enshi (婉子女王; 972–998), Imperial Prince Tamehira's daughter

Nakatsukasa (中務), Taira no Sukeyuki's daughter, – Nurse of Emperor Kazan

- Imperial Prince Kiyohito (清仁親王; c. 998–1030) – Ancestor of Shirakawa family (白川家)
- princess (d.1024), Fujiwara no Shoshi’s lady-in-waiting
- princess

Nakatsukasa (中務), Taira no Heishi (平平子), Taira no Suketada's daughter

- Imperial Prince Akinori (昭登親王; 998–1035)
- princess
- princess

(from unknown women)

- Kakugen (覚源; 1000–1065), a Buddhist monk (Gon-no-Sōjō, 権僧正)
- Shinkan (深観; 1001–1050), a Buddhist monk (Gon-no-Daisōzu, 権大僧都)

== Ancestry ==
Ancestors of Emperor Kazan

8. Emperor Daigo (885-930)
4. Emperor Murakami (926-967)
9. Fujiwara no Onshi (885-954)
2. Emperor Reizei (950-1011)
10.Fujiwara no Morosuke (909-960) (=12)
5. Fujiwara no Anshi (927-964)
11.Fujiwara no Seishi (d. 943) (=13)
1. Emperor Kazan
12.Fujiwara no Morosuke (909-960) (=10)
6. Fujiwara no Koretada (924-972)
13. Fujiwara no Seishi (d. 943) (=11)
3. Fujiwara no Kaishi (945-975)
14. Prince Yoakira (904-937)
7. Princess Keiko (925-992)
15. Fujiwara

== See also ==
- Emperor of Japan
- List of Emperors of Japan
- Imperial cult

== Notes ==
Japanese Imperial kamon—a stylized chrysanthemum blossom

Regnal titles
Preceded by Emperor En'yū	Emperor of Japan: Kazan; 984–986	Succeeded by Emperor Ichijō
