= Aimiya =

Aimiya (愛宮; dates unknown) was a Japanese noblewoman and waka poet of the Heian period.

== Life ==
The birth date of Aimiya, a noblewoman and waka poet of the mid-Heian period, is unknown. She was the daughter of Fujiwara no Morosuke and Princess Gashi.

She married Minamoto no Takaakira, becoming his second wife. According to the Kagerō Nikki, she entered religious orders in the sixth month of Anna (969).

Her date of death is unknown.

== Poetry ==
Her poetry has been preserved in such works as the Tōnomine Shōshō Monogatari, the Kagerō Nikki and the Saigū no Nyōgo Shū. One of her poems was also included in the Shūi Wakashū, an imperial anthology.

== Cited works ==
- Sugiyama, Shigeyuki (1986). "Aimiya". In Inukai, Kiyoshi; Inoue, Muneo; Ōkubo, Tadashi; Ono, Hiroshi; Tanaka, Yutaka; Hashimoto, Fumio; Fujihira, Haruo (eds.). Waka Daijiten (in Japanese). Tokyo: Meiji Shoin. p. 1. ISBN 4-625-40029-5.
