= Fujiwara no Morotada =

- Born: July 24, 920
- Died: December 1, 969
- Parents: Fujiwara no Tadahira (father)

Fujiwara no Morotada (藤原師尹; July 24, 920 — December 1, 969) was a Japanese statesman, courtier and politician during the Heian period.

== Career ==
He was a minister during the reign of Emperor Reizei.

- 968 (Kōhō 5, 12th month): Morotada is named udaijin.
- 969 (Anna 2, 3rd month): Morotada is elevated to the position of sadaijin in the Imperial court.
- 969 (Anna 2, 10th month): Sadaijin Morotada died.

== Genealogy ==
This member of the Fujiwara clan was the son of Fujiwara no Tadahira. Morotada was the youngest son. He had two brothers: Saneyori and Morosuke.
