= Fujiwara no Tamemitsu =

Japanese statesman, courtier and politician

- Born: 942
- Died: 992
- Parents: Fujiwara no Morosuke (father)

Fujiwara no Tamemitsu (藤原 為光) (942–992) was a Japanese statesman, courtier and politician during the Heian period.

== Career ==
Tamemitsu served as a minister during the reigns of Emperor En'yū, Emperor Kazan and Emperor Ichijō.

- 985 (Kanna 1}: Tamemitsu was named udaijin.
- 991 (Shōryaku 2, 9th month): Tamemitsu was promoted from udaijin to daijō Daijin.

He is referred to as Kōtoku-kō (恒徳公) (posthumous name as Daijō Daijin).

Tamemitsu erected Hōjū-ji temple to mourn his daughter Shishi.

== Genealogy ==
This member of the Fujiwara clan was the son of Fujiwara no Morosuke. His mother was Imperial Princess Masako, daughter of Emperor Daigo.

Tamemitsu had four brothers: Kaneie, Kanemichi, Kinsue. and Koretada.

=== Marriages and Children ===
Tamemitsu was married to a daughter of Fujiwara no Atsutoshi (first son of Fujiwara no Saneyori). They had at least four children.

- Sanenobu (964–1001) (誠信) - Sangi (参議)
- Tadanobu (or Narinobu) (967–1035) (斉信) - Dainagon
- daughter - married to Fujiwara no Yoshikane (son of Fujiwara no Koretada)
- Shishi (忯子) (969–985) - married to Emperor Kazan

He was also married to a daughter of regent Fujiwara no Koretada.

- Michinobu (道信) (972–994) - poet, one of Thirty-six Poetry Immortals
- Kinnobu (公信) (977–1026) - Gon-no-Chūnagon
- daughter - married to Sadaijin Minamoto no Masanobu
- Genshi (儼子) (died 1016) - side house of Fujiwara no Michinaga
- Jōshi (穠子) (979–1025) - Lady-in-waiting of Empress Kenshi (consort of Emperor Sanjō), and side house of Fujiwara no Michinaga
