= Fujiwara no Kaneie =

Japanese statesman, courtier and politician

Fujiwara no Kaneie 藤原兼家
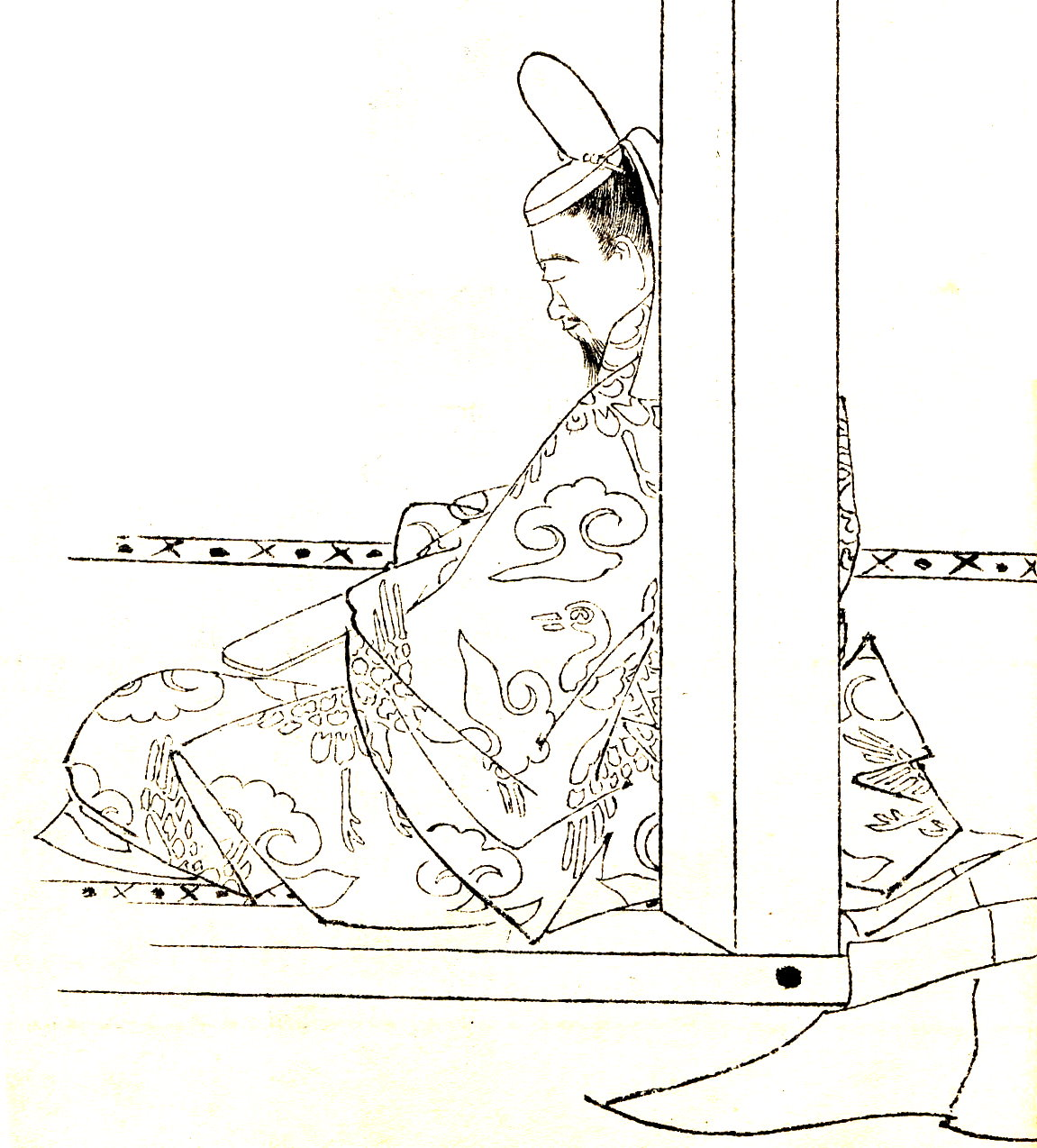
- Fujiwara no Kaneie by Kikuchi Yōsai

Daijō-daijin

Personal details
- Born: c. 929
- Died: July 26, 990 (aged 60–61)
- Children: Fujiwara no Michitaka; Fujiwara no Michikane; Fujiwara no Michinaga; Fujiwara no Senshi
- Parent: Fujiwara no Morosuke (father)

Fujiwara no Kaneie (藤原 兼家; c. 929 – July 26, 990) was a Japanese statesman, courtier and politician during the Heian period. He also was known as Hōkō-in Daijin and Higashi-sanjō-dono.

== Career ==
Kaneie served as a minister during the reigns of Emperor En'yū, Emperor Kazan and Emperor Ichijō.

After his rival brother Kanemichi's death in 977 he was appointed to Udaijin by his cousin Yoritada who became Kampaku after Kanemichi's death. He and his son Michikane encouraged Emperor Kazan to abdicate to accelerate Kaneie's accession to regent. Kaneie told Kazan that the Imperial Regalia was already held by Ichijo, and hence Kazan should not continue as ruler. Kazan acquiesced to Kaneie's demands, under some pressure, and went to the Gangyō-ji monastery. Kaneie's second son, Michikane, went with Kazan; he intended to also take the tonsure. When they arrived at the monastery, Michikane claimed that he would like to see his parents as a layman for the last time - he did not return. When Emperor Ichijo succeeded, Kaneie became Sesshō of Emperor Ichijō.

- 969 (Anna 1): Ju Sammi (従三位)
- 970 (Anna 2): Chūnagon
- 972 (Tenroku 3, 11th month): Kaneie was promoted from the office of Chūnagon to Dainagon
- 978 (Jōgen 3, 10th month): Kaneie was named Udaijin.
- 986 (Kanna 2, 24th day of the 6th month): Sesshō (摂政) for Emperor Ichijō
- 986 (Kanna 2, 20th day of the 7th month): retire from Udaijin
- 989 (Eiso 1, 12th month): Kaneie is named daijō daijin.
- 990 (Shōryaku 1, 5th month): Kaneie fell seriously ill; and he abandoned his offices to become a Buddhist monk.
- July 26, 990 (Shōryaku 1, 2nd day of the 7th month): Kaneie died at the age of 62.

== Family ==
Kaneie had four brothers: Kanemichi, Kinsue, Koretada, and Tamemitsu.

- Father: Fujiwara no Morosuke (藤原師輔, 909–960)
- Mother: Fujiwara no Moriko (藤原盛子, ?–943), daughter of Fujiwara no Tsunekuni (藤原経邦).
  - Wife: Fujiwara no Tokihime (藤原時姫, ?–980), daughter of Fujiwara no Nakamasa (藤原中正).
    - 1st son: Fujiwara no Michitaka (藤原道隆, 953–995), Sesshō and Kampaku of Emperor Ichijō.
    - 3rd son: Fujiwara no Michikane (藤原道兼, 961–995), Kampaku of Emperor Ichijō.
    - 5th son: Fujiwara no Michinaga (藤原道長, 966–1028), Kampaku of Emperor Go-Ichijō.
    - 1st daughter: Fujiwara no Chōshi (藤原超子, 954?-982), consort of Emperor Reizei and mother of Emperor Sanjō.
    - 2nd daughter: Fujiwara no Senshi (藤原詮子, 962–1002), consort of Emperor En'yū and mother of Emperor Ichijō.
  - Wife: known as Udaisyō Michitsuna no Haha (Mother of Udaishō Michitsuna) (右大将道綱母, 936?-995). She wrote Kagerō Nikki (蜻蛉日記) and was the daughter of Fujiwara no Tomoyasu (藤原倫寧の娘).
    - 2nd son: Fujiwara no Michitsuna (藤原道綱, 955–1020), Dainagon.
  - Wife: Yasukonaishinnō (保子内親王, 949–987), third daughter of Emperor Murakami.
  - Wife: Tai no Ankata (対の御方), daughter of Fujiwara no Kuninori (藤原国章).
    - 3rd daughter: Fujiwara no Yasuko/Suishi (藤原綏子, 974–1004), consort of Emperor Sanjō.
  - Wife: name unknown, Chūjō miyasudokoro (中将御息所), possibly daughter of Fujiwara no Kanetada (藤原懐忠).
  - Wife: name unknown.
  - Wife: daughter of Fujiwara no Tadamoto (藤原忠幹の娘)
    - 4th son: Fujiwara no Michiyoshi (藤原道義)
  - Wife: daughter of Minamoto no Kanetada (源兼忠の娘)
    - Daughter: name unknown (960?-), lady in waiting. Adopted daughter of Michitsuna no Haha
