= Fujiwara no Yoritada =

Fujiwara no Yoritada (藤原 頼忠; 924 – 31 July 989), the second son of Saneyori, was a kugyo (high-ranked Japanese noble) who served as regent for Emperor En'yū and Emperor Kazan. His mother was a daughter of Fujiwara no Tokihira. His elder brother from the same mother Fujiwara no Atsutoshi died before their father's death.

In 977 he became Sadaijin, and when his cousin, the regent Fujiwara no Kanemichi was in a critical medical condition, he ceded the position of Kampaku (regent) to Yoritada, instead of his rival brother Kaneie.

Although Yoritada's two daughters were consorts of Emperor En'yū and Emperor Kazan, they did not have any sons. Yoritada thus had only a tenable blood relationship with the Emperors. His cousin Kaneie was the grandfather of Crown Prince Yasuhito (Emperor Ichijō), and he encouraged Emperor Kazan to abdicate a throne. By the accession of Emperor Ichijō, Yoritada retired from his post as Kampaku, and Kaneie became Sessho (regent) for his grandson Emperor Ichijō. Yoritada was Daijō Daijin from 978, and he is referred to as Rengi-kō (廉義公) (posthumous name of Daijō Daijin).

His poet son Fujiwara no Kintō compiled the Shūi Wakashū, and also a collection of Chinese verse and prose (~600 selections) and 25 Japanese poems in his Wakan Rōeishū (和漢朗詠集), a widely admired collection that helped spread the influence of Chinese culture (and especially the poetry of Bai Juyi) in the Japanese Imperial court. Kintō's collection would be imitated by a successor, Fujiwara no Mototoshi's Shinsen Rōeishū (新撰朗詠集). Kintō also wrote an influential critical guide to incorporating Bai Juyi's poetic techniques (and more generally, Tang dynasty poetry) into Japanese poetry called Shinsen Zuinō (新撰髄脳) ("The Essence of Poetry Newly Selected").
