= Fujiwara no Kinsue =

Japanese statesman, courtier and politician

- Born: 957
- Died: 1029
- Parents: Fujiwara no Morosuke (father)

Fujiwara no Kinsue (藤原 公季; 957–1029), also known as Kaikō, was a Japanese statesman, courtier and politician during the Heian period.

== Career ==
Kinsue served as a minister during the reign of Emperor Go-Ichijō.

- 997 (Chōtoku 3, 7th month): Kinsue was promoted from the office of dainagon to naidaijin.
- 1017 (Kannin 1, 3rd month): Kinsue is made udaijin.
- 1021 (Jian 1, 7th month): Kinsue was promoted from the office of udaijin to daijō daijin.
- 1029 (Chōgen 2, 10th month): Daijō daijin Kinsue died; and he was posthumously named Kai-kō. He was given the posthumous title of as Jingi-kō (仁義公).

== Genealogy ==
This member of the Fujiwara clan was a son of Morosuke. Kinsue's mother was Imperial Princess Kōshi, daughter of Emperor Daigo. She died in Kinsue's childhood; and he was brought up by his sister Empress Anshi, who was a consort of Emperor Murakami.

Kinsue was the youngest of his four brothers: Kaneie, Kanemichi, Koretada, and Tamemitsu.

Kinsue, also known as Kan'in Kinsue, is the progenitor of Kan'in family (閑院家) which was later divided into Sanjō family, Saionji Family, Tokudaiji family and the Tōin family.

Kinsue was married to a daughter of Imperial Prince Ariakira; and from this marriage, three children were produced:

- Gishi (義子) (974–1053) - married to Emperor Ichijō
- Sanenari (実成) (975–1004) - Chūnagon
- Nyogen (如源) (977–1021) - priest (Sanmai Sōzu, 三昧僧都)
