= Fujiwara no Michinobu =

Japanese waka poet of the mid-Heian period

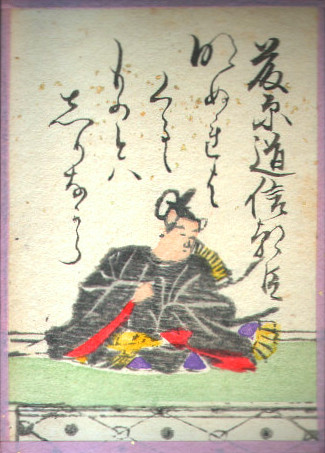
Fujiwara no Michinobu, from the Ogura Hyakunin Isshu.

Fujiwara no Michinobu (藤原道信; 972–994) was a Japanese waka poet of the mid-Heian period. One of his poems was included in the Ogura Hyakunin Isshu. He produced a private waka collection, the Michinobu-shū.

== Biography ==
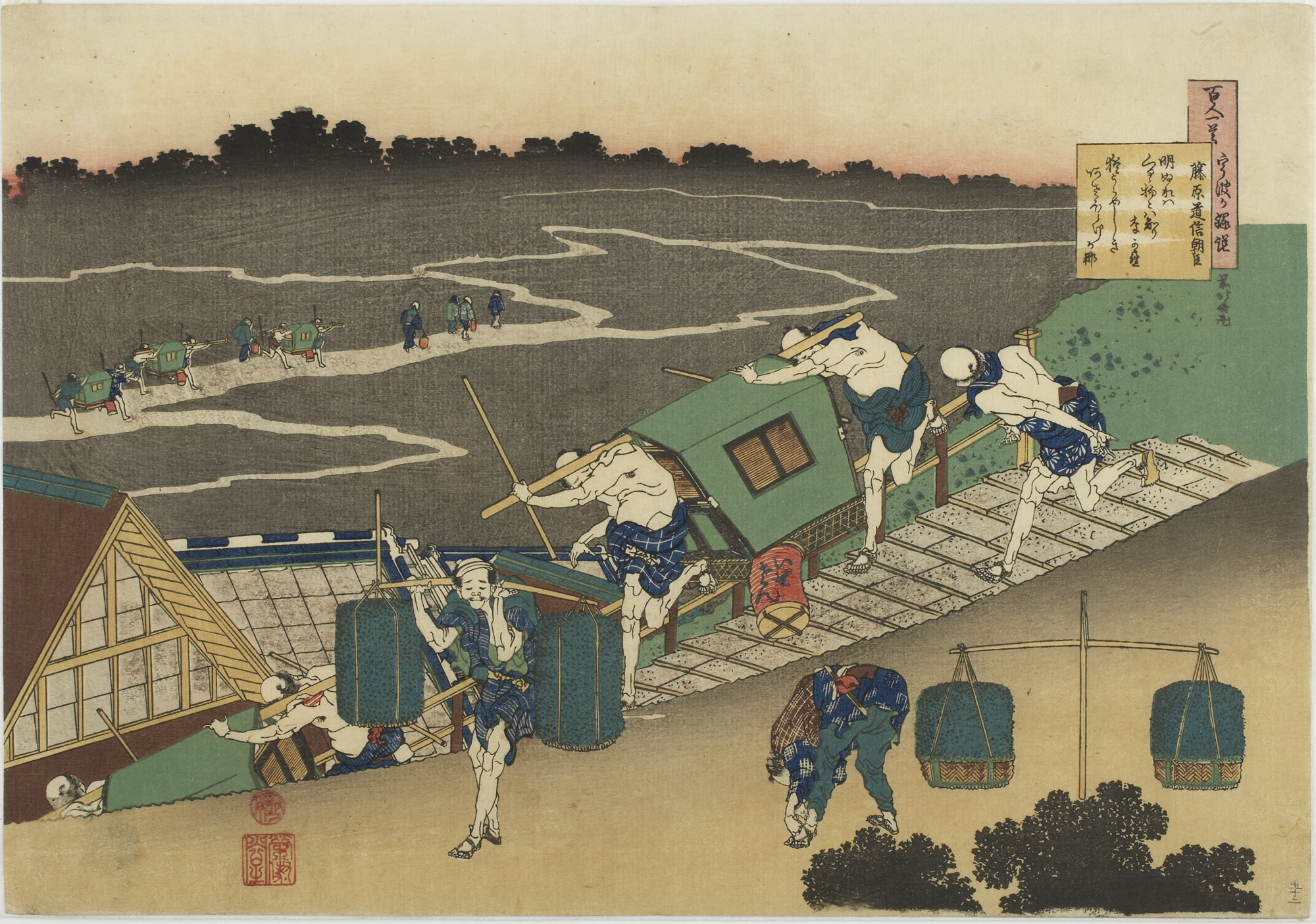
Katsushika Hokusai, The Poem of Fujiwara no Michinobu Ason, 1839, Princeton University Art Museum, depicting the poem transcribed in the cartouche at upper right: Though I know full well That the night will come again, E'en when day has dawned; Yet, in truth, I hate the sight, Of the morning's coming light.

Born in 972, he was a son of Tamemitsu and adopted by the latter's brother Kaneie.

He served as commander of the guard, and although he died young he was considered a brilliant commander. He died in 994.

== Poetry ==
Forty-eight of his poems were included in imperial anthologies, and he was listed as one of the Late Classical Thirty-Six Immortals of Poetry.

The following poem by him was included as No. 52 in Fujiwara no Teika's Ogura Hyakunin Isshu:

Japanese text	Romanized Japanese	English translation
明けぬれば 暮るるものとは 知りながら なほうらめしき 朝ぼらけかな	Akenureba kururu mono to wa shiri-nagara nao urameshiki asaborake kana	As the sun rises I know that when it sets at night I can see you again. Yet even so, how hateful— Parting in this cold light of dawn.

A private collection of his poems, the Michinobu-shū (道信集), survives.

== Bibliography ==
- Keene, Donald (1999). A History of Japanese Literature, Vol. 1: Seeds in the Heart — Japanese Literature from Earliest Times to the Late Sixteenth Century. New York: Columbia University Press. ISBN 978-0-231-11441-7.
- McMillan, Peter. 2010 (1st ed. 2008). One Hundred Poets, One Poem Each. New York: Columbia University Press.
- Suzuki Hideo, Yamaguchi Shin'ichi, Yoda Yasushi. 2009 (1st ed. 1997). Genshoku: Ogura Hyakunin Isshu. Tokyo: Bun'eidō.
