= Tōnomine Shōshō Monogatari =

Heian period monogatari

The Tōnomine Shōshō Monogatari (多武峯少将物語; "The Tale of the Lesser Captain of Tōnomine") is a mid-Heian period monogatari in one volume. It is also known as the Takamitsu Nikki (高光日記; "The Diary of Takamitsu"), although its actual author is unknown. It is believed to have completed in the Ōwa or Kōhō eras, or 961-968. It tells the story of how the Lesser Captain of the Right Fujiwara no Takamitsu moved to Tōnomine in August 961, and centers around the waka exchanged between Takamitsu, his wife (the daughter of Fujiwara no Atsutoshi) and his sister Ainomiya.

== See also ==
- Heian literature
