= Fujiwara no Anshi =

Fujiwara no Anshi 藤原安子

Empress consort of Japan
- Tenure: December 10, 958 – June 11, 964
- Born: 927
- Died: June 11, 964 (aged 36–37); Heian Kyō (Kyōto)
- Spouse: Emperor Murakami
- Issue: Princess Shōshi; Emperor Reizei; Prince Tamehira; Princess Sukeko; Princess Shishi; Emperor En'yu; Princess Senshi
- House: Imperial House of Japan
- Father: Fujiwara no Morosuke
- Mother: Fujiwara no Seishi (藤原盛子)

Fujiwara no Anshi (藤原 安子; 927 – June 11, 964) was an empress consort of Japan. She was the consort of Emperor Murakami of Japan.

She was the daughter of Fujiwara no Morosuke (藤原師輔).

Fujiwara no Anshi managed to acquire great influence over the Emperor, and has been called the most influential woman of the Imperial Court for twenty years. Her sister Toshi (d. 975), married to the Emperor's half brother Prince Shigeakira (904-954), had an affair with the Emperor at one point, but the affair ended because of the dislike of Anshi and did not continue until after her death. She favoured her second favorite son Prince Tamehira as successor, but died before she had time to secure his succession.

When her eldest brother, regent Fujiwara no Koremasa died in 972, her second eldest brother Fujiwara no Kanemichi secured his succession as regent before the popular youngest brother Fujiwara no Kaneie by producing a statement to the Emperor from his mother, Anshi, in which she stated that the office of regent should be inherited by an elder son before a younger, a recommendation the Emperor followed after having acknowledged the writing as that of his mother.

Issue

- Imperial Princess Shōshi (承子内親王) (948–951)
- Imperial Prince Norihira (憲平親王) (950–1011) (2nd son) (Emperor Reizei)
- Imperial Prince Tamehira (為平親王) (952–1010)
- Imperial Princess Sukeko (輔子内親王) (953–992) (7th daughter), 32nd Saiō in Ise Shrine 968–969
- Imperial Princess Shishi (資子内親王) (955–1015) (9th daughter)
- Imperial Prince Morihira (守平親王) (959–991) (Emperor En'yu)
- Imperial Princess Senshi (選子内親王) (964–1035) (10th daughter), 16th Saiin in Kamo Shrine 975–1031

== Notes ==
Japanese royalty
Preceded by Fujiwara no Onshi	Empress consort of Japan; 958–964	Succeeded by Princess Masako
