= Tenen =

Tenen may refer to:

- Ten'en, a Japanese era
- Tatenen, also known as Tenen, an Egyptian god
- Tenen Holtz (1877–1971), Russian Empire born American actor
- Locum tenens, a Latin phrase meaning "place holder"
