= Fujiwara no Senshi =

Japanese empress dowager

Fujiwara no Senshi 藤原詮子
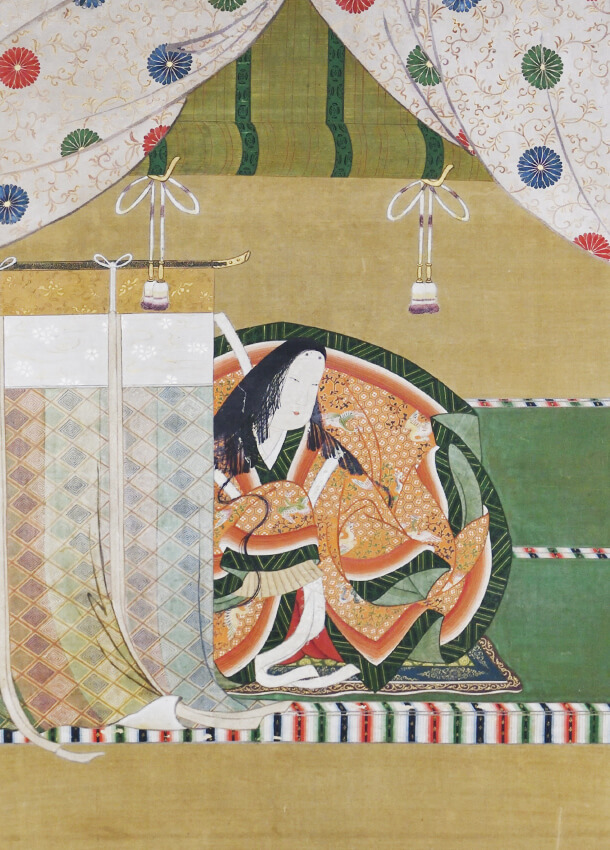

Empress dowager of Japan
- Tenure: 986–991
- Born: 962
- Died: 7 February 1002
- Burial: Uji Mausoleum
- Issue: Emperor Ichijō
Temple name
- Higashisanjō'in 東三条院
- House: Fujiwara clan
- Father: Fujiwara no Kaneie
- Mother: Fujiwara no Tokihime

Fujiwara no Senshi (藤原詮子) was a Japanese noble woman and empress dowager of Japan. She was a consort of Emperor En'yū and mother of Emperor Ichijō.

== Life ==
Fujiwara no Senshi was born in 962 to Fujiwara no Kaneie. She became a consort of Emperor En'yū, and was favoured by him, giving him one child, Prince Yasuhito (later Emperor Ichijō).

When En'yū's first wife, Fujiwara no Koshi died, Senshi was expected to take the position of empress consort. Due to her father only being Minister of the Right at the time, this did not happen and En'yū married Fujiwara no Junshi.

En'yū was succeeded by Emperor Kazan, who was in turn succeeded by Emperor Ichijō, and Senshi was appointed empress dowager.

During that time, Fujiwara no Korechika and Fujiwara no Michinaga were at odds with each other. Senshi became very influential during this time and was able to use that influence to persuade Ichijō to side with Michinaga.

She is recorded by Sei Shōnagon in The Pillow Book during her time as empress dowager.

She was a powerful member of court and a land owner in her own right. Senshi owned Ichijō palace where her son, Emperor Ichijō, spent much of his reign and for where he gets his posthumous name of Ichijō.

She was very influential in the appointment of ministers and matters of state.

In 991, Senshi gave up her title as empress dowager to become a nun. She would die in 1002.

Japanese royalty
Preceded by Fujiwara no Chikako	Empress dowager of Japan; 986–991	Succeeded by Fujiwara no Junshi
