= Gangyō-ji =

Buddhist temple in Yamashina-ku, Kyoto, Japan

Gankei-ji
- 元慶寺
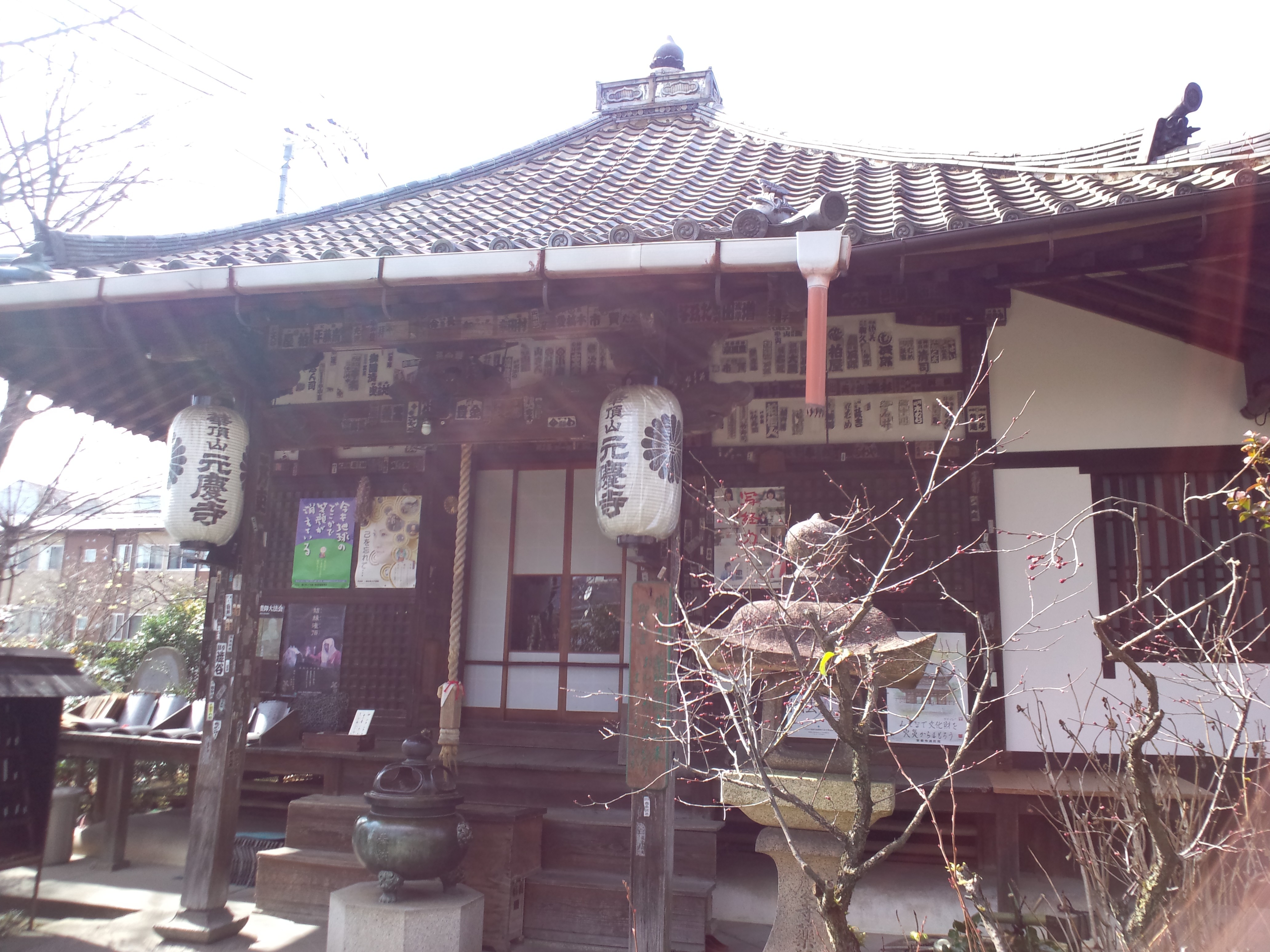
- Gankei-ji Hondo

- Location within Kyoto Prefecture Location within Japan

Religion
- Affiliation: Buddhist
- Deity: Tokudo Shonin
- Rite: Yakushi Nyorai
- Status: functional

Location
- Location: 13 Kitakazan Kawaramachi, Yamashina-ku, Kyoto-shi, Kyoto-fu
- Coordinates: 34°59′19.1″N 135°48′04.2″E

Architecture
- Founder: Henjō
- Completed: 868

Website
- Official website

Gankei-ji (元慶寺) is a Buddhist temple located in the Kitakazan Kawaramachi, neighborhood of Yamashina-ku, Kyoto, Japan. It belongs to the Tendai sect of Japanese Buddhism and its honzon is a statue of Yakushi Nyorai. It is more commonly known throughout its history as "Gangyō-ji" from an alternative transliteration of the kanji in its name. The temple's full name is Kachō-zan Gankei-ji (華頂山 元慶寺). The temple is a "bangai" temple located between the 14th and 15th stops on the Saigoku Kannon Pilgrimage route.

== Overview ==
Gangyō-ji was constructed in 868 as a jōgakuji (private temple which had been accorded official status) at the request of Fujiwara no Takako, the mother of Emperor Yōzei. The founding monk was Henjō, one of the Six Immortal Poets. In 877 (the first year of the Gangyō era), it became an official temple at the request of Emperor Yōzei, and changed its name to reflect the nengō. In 986, Emperor Kazan was forced to become a monk at this temple through a scheme by Fujiwara no Kaneie and his son Fujiwara no Michikane, and Kaneie's grandson, Prince Kanehito (Emperor Ichijō), ascended to the throne. As Emperor Kazan was tonsured at this temple, it became popular known as "Kazan-ji" (花山寺), and is referred by this name in the Ōkagami. Because of its ties to Emperor Kazan, the temple is listed as an extra temple on the pilgrimage to the Saigoku Pilgrimage.

The temple was destroyed by fire during the Ōnin War, and the grounds have since shrunk. The current Main Hall was rebuilt during the An'ei era (1772-1781).

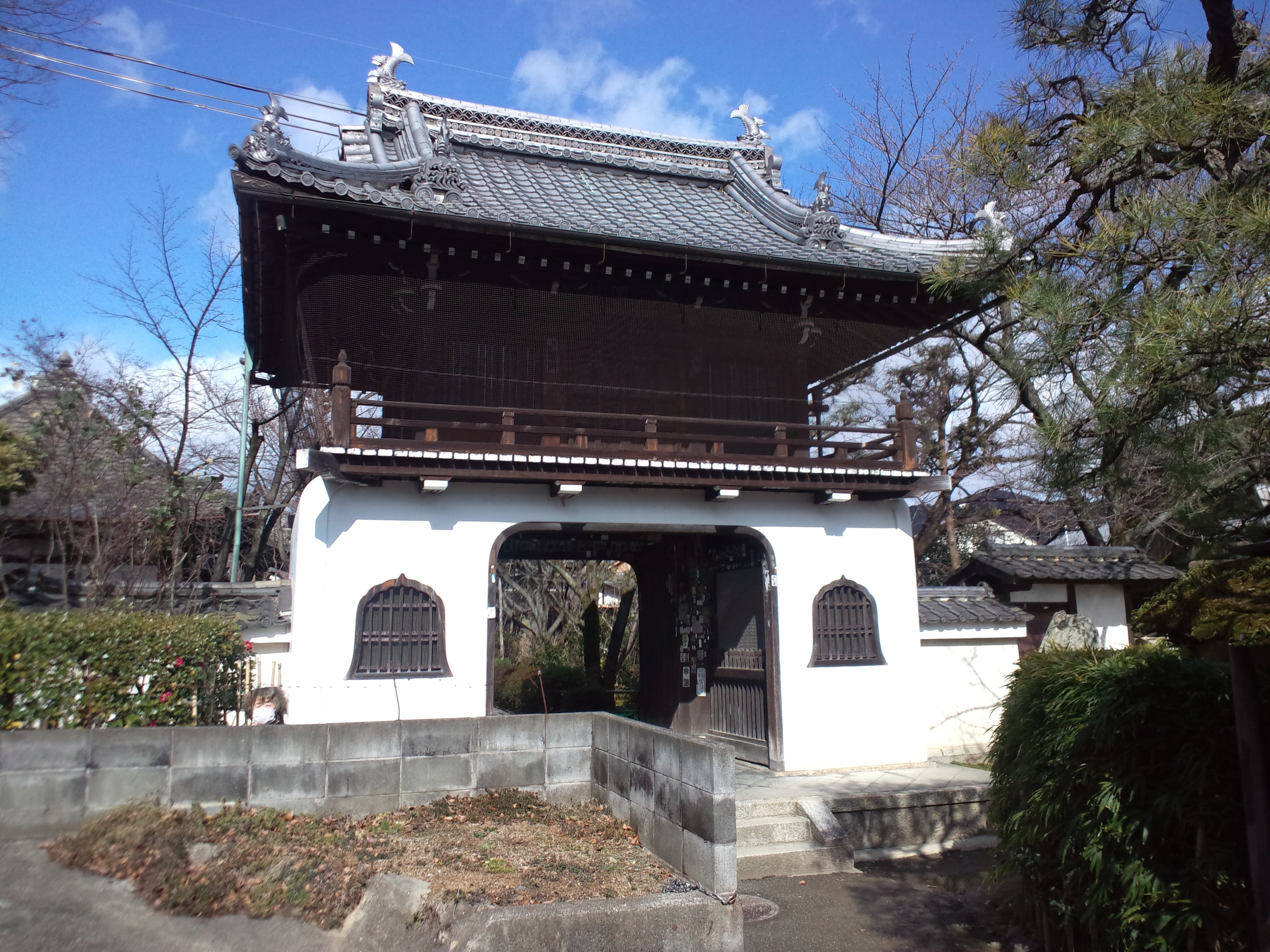
Sanmon

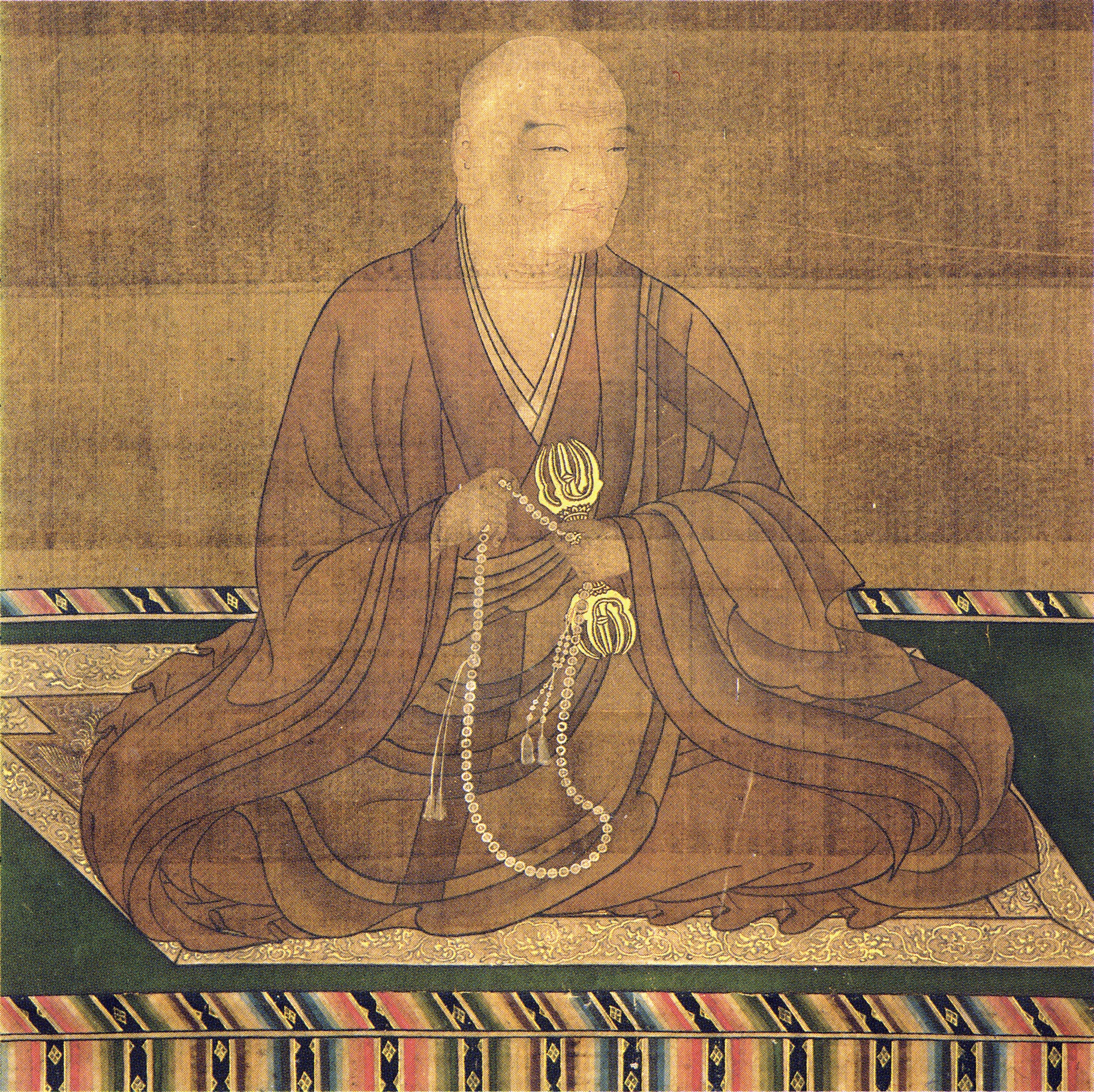
Emperor Kazan

The temple is approximately a 20 minute walk from Misasagi Station on the Kyoto Municipal Subway Tōzai Line.
