= Emperor En'yū =

Emperor of Japan from 969 to 984

Emperor En'yū 円融天皇
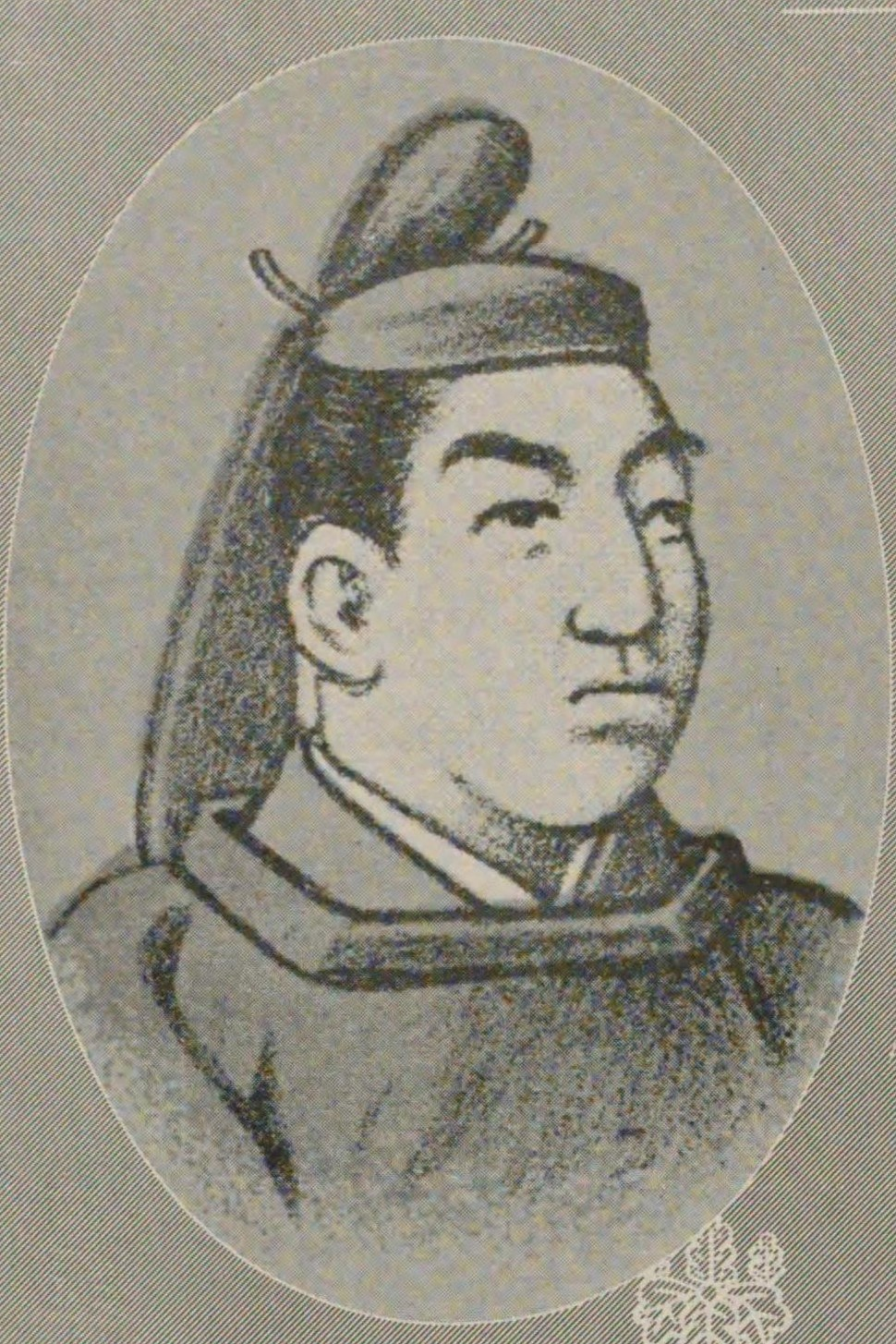

Emperor of Japan
- Reign: September 27, 969 – September 24, 984
- Enthronement: November 5, 969
- Predecessor: Reizei
- Successor: Kazan
- Born: April 12, 958; Heian Kyō (Kyōto)
- Died: March 1, 991 (aged 32); En'yū-ji temple (円融寺)
- Burial: Nochi no Mukarami no misasagi (後村上陵) (Kyōt
- Spouses: Fujiwara no Koshi (m. 973, died 979) Fujiwara no Junshi (m. 982)
- Issue: Emperor Ichijō
Posthumous name
- Tsuigō: Emperor En'yū (円融院 or 円融天皇)
- House: Imperial House of Japan
- Father: Emperor Murakami
- Mother: Fujiwara no Anshi

Emperor En'yū (円融天皇, En'yū-tennō; 12 April 958 – 1 March 991) was the 64th Emperor of Japan, according to the traditional order of succession.

En'yū's reign spanned the years from 969 through 984.

== Biography ==
Before his ascension to the Chrysanthemum Throne, his personal name (imina) was Morihira-shinnō.

Morihira-shinnō was the fifth son of Emperor Murakami by the empress consort Anshi, the daughter of Fujiwara no Morosuke, therefore the brother of Emperor Reizei.

In 967, Morihira-shinnō was appointed as the crown prince, bypassing his elder brother by the same mother, since his brother had no support from the Fujiwara clan.

En'yū had five Empresses or Imperial consorts and one Imperial son.

== Events of En'yū's life ==
- 27 September 969 (Anna 2, 13th day of the 8th month): In the 3rd year of Emperor Reizei's reign (冷泉天皇三年), he abdicated; and the succession (senso) was received by a younger brother.
- 5 November 969 (Anna 2, 23rd day of the 9th month): Emperor En'yu is said to have acceded to the throne (‘‘sokui’’).
- 8 June 976 (Ten'en 2, 11th day of the 5th month): The Imperial Palace burned down; and the Sacred Mirror was blackened to such an extent that it reflected no light.
- 31 December 980 (Tengen 3, 22nd day of the 11th month): The Imperial Palace burned down; and the Sacred Mirror was half destroyed.
- 5 December 982 (Tengen 5, 17th day of the 11th month): The Imperial Palace burned down; and the Sacred Mirror was reduced to a lump of melted metal which was collected and presented to the emperor.

In his reign there was a severe struggle between the Fujiwara clan over who would be appointed kampaku. Emperor En'yū followed his mother's advice and favored Fujiwara no Kanemichi, his maternal uncle. He had only one son, later the emperor Emperor Ichijō by Senshi, a daughter of his uncle Fujiwara no Kaneie, who was another brother of his mother. He made the daughter of Kanemichi the empress consort, though she bore no children. Senshi and her father Kaneie were angry at this elevation of their rival and were absent from the court for a long time, staying at the mansion of Kaneie with the child.

Imperial processions to the Hachiman and Hirano Shrines were first made during the reign of Emperor En'yū.

- 24 September 984 (Eikan 2, 27th of the 8th month): The emperor abdicated at age 26.
- 16 September 985 (Kanna 1, 29th of the 8th month): The former-Emperor En'yū took the tonsure, becoming a Buddhist priest and taking the name of Kongō Hō.
- 1 March 991 (Shōryaku 2, 12th of the 2nd month): En'yū, now known as Kongō Hō, died at age 32.

The actual site of En'yū's grave is known. This emperor is traditionally venerated at a memorial Shinto shrine (misasagi) at Kyoto.

The Imperial Household Agency designates this location as En'yū's mausoleum. It is formally named Nochi no Mukarami no misasagi.

=== Kugyō ===
Kugyō (公卿) is a collective term for the very few most powerful men attached to the court of the Emperor of Japan in pre-Meiji eras.

In general, this elite group included only three to four men at a time. These were hereditary courtiers whose experience and background have brought them to the pinnacle of a life's career. During En'yū's reign, this apex of the Daijō-kan included:

- Kampaku, Ōno-no-miya Fujiwara no Saneyori (藤原実頼), 900–970.
- Kampaku, Fujiwara no Yoritada (藤原頼忠), 924–989.
- Daijō-daijin, Fujiwara no Saneyori.
- Daijō-daijin, Fujiwara no Koretada (藤原伊尹)
- Daijō-daijin, Fujiwara no Kanemichi (藤原兼通)
- Daijō-daijin, Fujiwara no Yoritada.
- Sesshō, Fujiwara no Koretada, 924–972.
- Udaijin, Fujiwara no Koretada.
- Udaijin, Fujiwara no Kaneie (藤原兼家), 929–990.
- Udaijin, Fujiwara no Kanemichi, 925–977.
- Naidaijin, Fujiwara no Kanemichi
- Dainagon, Minamoto no Kaneakira (源兼明)
- Dainagon, Fujiwara no Morouji (藤原師氏) (Gon-no-Dainagon, 権大納言)
- Dainagon, Fujiwara no Koretada (藤原伊尹)
- Dainagon, Fujiwara no Yoritada (藤原頼忠)
- Dainagon, Tachibana no Yoshifuru (橘好古)
- Dainagon, Minamoto no Masanobu (源雅信)
- Dainagon, Fujiwara no Kaneie (藤原兼家)
- Dainagon, Minamoto no Nobumitsu (源延光) (Gon-no-Dainagon, 権大納言)
- Dainagon, Fujiwara no Tamemitsu (藤原為光)
- Dainagon, Fujiwara no Asateru (藤原朝光) (Gon-no-Dainagon, 権大納言)
- Dainagon, Minamoto no Shigenobu (源重信)
- Dainagon, Fujiwara no Naritoki (藤原済時) (Gon-no-Dainagon, 権大納言)

== Eras of En'yū's reign ==
The years of En'yū's reign are more specifically identified by more than one era name (gengō or nengō).

- Anna (968–970)
- Tenroku (970–973)
- Ten'en (973–976)
- Jōgen (976–978)
- Tengen (978–983)
- Eikan (983–985)

== Consorts and children ==
Empress (Chūgū): Fujiwara no Koshi (藤原媓子), Fujiwara no Kanemichi’s daughter

Empress (Chūgū): Fujiwara no Junshi/Nobuko (藤原遵子), Fujiwara no Yoritada’s daughter

Consort (Nyōgo): Imperial Princess Sonshi (尊子内親王; 966–985), Emperor Reizei’s daughter

Consort (Nyōgo): Fujiwara no Senshi (藤原詮子; 962–1002), Fujiwara no Kaneie’s daughter; later, Nyoin (女院) 'Higashi-sanjō In' (東三条院)

- First Son: Imperial Prince Yasuhito (懐仁親王) later Emperor Ichijō

Court Attendant (Koui): Chujo-Miyasudokoro (中将御息所), Fujiwara no Kanetada's daughter

Court Attendant (Koui): Shōshō kōui (少将更衣)

== Ancestry ==
Ancestors of Emperor En'yū

8. Emperor Uda (867-931)
4. Emperor Daigo (885-930)
9. Fujiwara no Inshi (d. 896)
2. Emperor Murakami (926-967)
10. Fujiwara no Mototsune (836-891)
5. Fujiwara no Onshi (885-954)
11. Princess Sōshi
1. Emperor En'yū
12. Fujiwara no Tadahira (880-949)
6. Fujiwara no Morosuke (909-960)
13. Minamoto no Shōshi
3. Fujiwara no Anshi (927-964)
14. Fujiwara no Tsunekuni
7. Fujiwara no Seishi (d. 943)

== See also ==
- Imperial cult
- Emperor Go-En'yū

== Notes ==
Japanese Imperial kamon — a stylized chrysanthemum blossom

Regnal titles
Preceded by Emperor Reizei	Emperor of Japan: En'yū; 969–984	Succeeded by Emperor Kazan
