= Anna (era) =

Period of Japanese history (968–970 CE)

Anna (安和) was a Japanese era (年号, nengō; "year name") after Kōhō and before Tenroku. This period spanned the years from August 968 through March 970. The reigning emperors were Reizei-tennō (冷泉天皇) and En'yū-tennō (円融天皇).

== Change of era ==
- February 2, 968 Anna gannen (安和元年): The new era name was created to mark an event or series of events. The previous era ended and the new one commenced in Kōhō 4, on the 15th day of the 8th month of 968.

== Events of the Anna era ==
- October 26, 968 (Anna 1, 26th day of the 10th month): A child who would become Emperor Kazan is born in the house of the man who would become Emperor Ichijō.
- September 27, 969 (Anna 2, 13th day of the 8th month): Fujiwara no Saneyori (藤原実頼) was appointed sesshō (regent).
- 969 (Anna 2, 10th month): The sadaijin Fujiwara no Morotada (藤原師尹) died.
- 969 (Anna 2, 12th month): The sesshō Saneyori celebrated his 70th birthday.
- 969 (Anna 2): The "Anna Incident" (Anna no hen)

== Notes ==
| Preceded by Kōhō | Era or nengō Anna; 964–968 | Succeeded by Tenroku |
