= Fujiwara no Morosuke =

Japanese statesman, courtier and politician

Fujiwara no Morosuke 藤原師輔
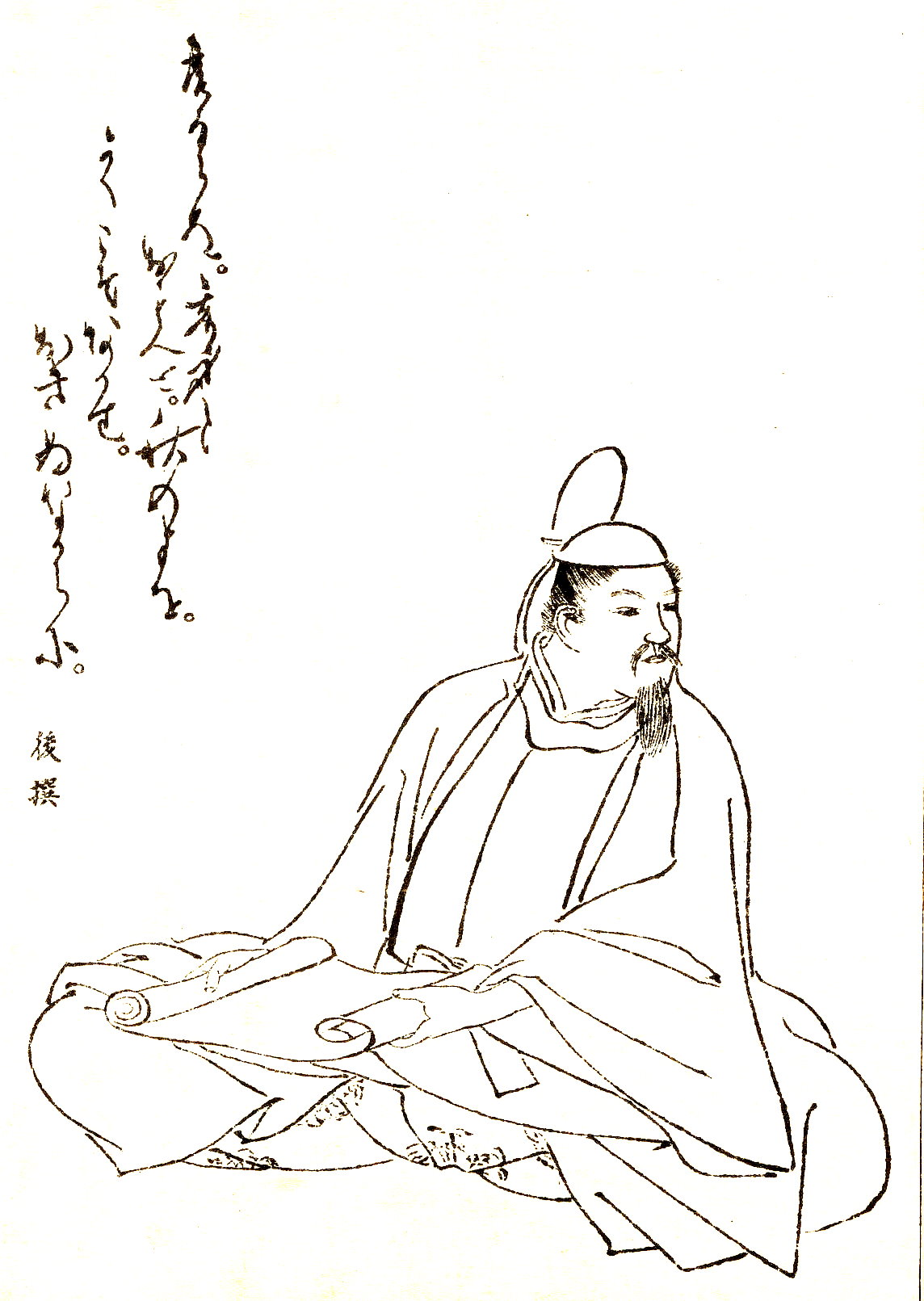
- Illustration by Kikuchi Yōsai, from Zenken Kojitsu
- Born: January 11, 909
- Died: May 31, 960
- Family: Fujiwara Hokke
- Father: Fujiwara no Tadahira

Fujiwara no Morosuke (藤原 師輔; January 11, 909 – May 31, 960), also known as Kujō-dono or Bōjō-udaijin, was a Japanese statesman, courtier and politician during the middle Heian period. Considered a learned scholar and well-versed in the customs of the court, he supported the court's government as udaijin during the reign of Emperor Murakami. Morosuke's eldest daughter Fujiwara no Anshi, empress consort to Emperor Murakami, gave birth to two princes who later became Emperor Reizei and Emperor En'yū, putting Morosuke's lineage in an advantageous position as the maternal relatives of the Emperor.

== Life ==
Morosuke was born the second son of Fujiwara no Tadahira, who controlled the government for many years as sekkan (regent) and daijō-daijin. Around 930 he had an affair with a daughter of Emperor Daigo, Princess Kinshi, and was later permitted to marry her. This was the first time a non-imperial Japanese retainer married an imperial princess — in previous cases where retainers married the daughters of emperors, those daughters had first been divested of their imperial status. From 931 to 947 he was steadily promoted, passing through the position of sangi and attaining the post of provisional chūnagon.

When Taira no Masakado launched his rebellion, Fujiwara no Tadabumi was appointed as great general in charge of subduing the east (征東大将軍), but the rebellion was put down before he could join battle. The court debated Tadabumi's honors, and Morosuke's older brother Saneyori argued that as Tadabumi had not done anything, he should not be granted any prize. Morosuke argued that as Tadabumi had accepted his orders and set out from the capital, he should still be rewarded. Saneyori stuck to his position, but public opinion favored Morosuke.

After this Morosuke was promoted to dainagon, made a general in the imperial guard (右近衛大将), and bestowed the junior second rank (従二位).

In 947, Emperor Suzaku abdicated, and Emperor Murakami ascended to the throne. As Saneyori was promoted to sadaijin, Morosuke filled his old position as udaijin and was granted the senior second rank (正二位). Promotion naturally favored the eldest son and family heir, but Morosuke was considered excellent enough to cause problems for his older brother despite this: Morosuke held more real power than even Saneyori. Morosuke had married his eldest daughter Anshi to Murakami while he was still the crown prince. With his enthronement she became a court lady and assisted the emperor often. When they had a child, the future Emperor Reizei, Anshi was made chūgū. As the maternal grandfather of the crown prince, Morosuke and his cohorts were able to lead the court by Murakami's side for about ten years.

After the death of his wife Princess Kinshi, Morosuke married Princess Gashi, and when she died Princess Yasuko, all of whom were daughters of Emperor Daigo, thus further deepening his ties with the imperial line. Because he had affairs with and then married three different imperial princesses, Morosuke may have been the model for a character in the Utsubo Monogatari, the ultimate lecher, Fujiwara no Kanemasa.

In 960 Morosuke was laid out by illness, and according to the customs of the day attempted to cut his hair and take the tonsure, but Emperor Murakami sent a messenger to dissuade him. Even so, his sickness worsened, and on May 29 he cut off his hair, only to die two days later on May 31, 960, at the age of 53.

Morosuke never held the position of sekkan in his life, but the successive reigns of his grandchildren Emperor Reizei and Emperor En'yū after Murakami's death put his family in an outstanding position as the emperor's maternal relatives. His eldest son Koretada briefly held power as sekkan, and his other sons Kanemichi, Kaneie, Tamemitsu, and Kinsue also all attained the position of daijō-daijin. In Morosuke's children's generation, his descendants were the legitimate line of the Fujiwara regent family.

== Personality and works ==
Morosuke and his older brother Saneyori, both educated by Fujiwara no Tadahira, each formed their own school of the practices and traditions of the court. Morosuke formed the Kujō-ryū (九条流), and Saneyori the Ononomiya-ryū (小野宮流), which were passed down to their respective descendants. Morosuke recorded the practices of his school in a book called the Kujō Nenchū-gyōji (九条年中行事). He was friends with Minamoto no Takaakira, who was also versed in the ways of the court, and to whom he married his third and fifth daughters. The talented Takaakira flourished with Morosuke's support.

Morosuke was also an excellent poet, leaving behind a collection of his works simply called Morosuke-shū (師輔集). In 956 he held a party in his garden, and the Ōkagami contains an anecdote about his visit to Ki no Tsurayuki to request that the latter write a poem for him. Thirty-six of Morosuke's poems are included in the Gosen Wakashū.

His personal diary Kyūreki (九暦) and the dying instructions he left for his descendants, Kujō-dono Ikai (九条殿遺誡), are also preserved.

== Genealogy ==
- Father: Fujiwara no Tadahira
- Mother: Minamoto no Shōshi (源昭子), daughter of Minamoto Yoshiari
- Wife: Fujiwara no Seishi (藤原盛子; ?–943), daughter of Fujiwara no Tsunekuni (藤原経邦)
  - First son: Fujiwara no Koretada (924-972)
  - Second son: Fujiwara no Kanemichi (925-977)
  - Third son: Fujiwara no Kaneie (929-990)
  - Fifth son: Fujiwara no Tadakimi (藤原忠君; ?–968), adopted by Fujiwara no Tadahira
  - First daughter: Fujiwara no Anshi (927–964), wife of Emperor Murakami, mother of Emperor Reizei and Emperor En'yū
  - Second daughter: Fujiwara no Tōshi (藤原登子; ?-975), wife of Prince Shigeakira (重明親王), concubine of Emperor Murakami, naishi-no-kami
  - Third daughter: wife of Minamoto no Takaakira
  - Sixth daughter: Fujiwara no Fushi (藤原怤子), court lady of Emperor Reizei, naishi-no-kami
- Wife: daughter of Fujiwara no Akitada (藤原顕忠)
  - Fourth son: Fujiwara no Tōkazu (藤原遠量)
  - Seventh son: Fujiwara no Tōmoto (藤原遠基)
- Wife: daughter of Fujiwara no Kimikazu (藤原公葛)
  - Sixth son: Fujiwara no Tōtabi (藤原遠度; ?-989)
- Wife: Imperial Princess Kinshi (勤子内親王; 904-938), daughter of Emperor Daigo
- Wife: Imperial Princess Gashi (雅子内親王; 910-954), daughter of Emperor Daigo, Saiō of Ise Shrine
  - Eighth son: Fujiwara no Takamitsu (939-994)
  - Ninth son: Fujiwara no Tamemitsu (藤原為光; 942-992)
  - Tenth son: Jinzen (尋禅; 943-990), Tendai school Buddhist monk
  - Fifth daughter: Aimiya (愛宮), wife of Minamoto no Takaakira
- Wife: Imperial Princess Koushi (康子内親王; 919-957), daughter of Emperor Daigo
  - Eleventh son: Shinkaku (深覚; 955-1041), head managing monk of Tōdai-ji
  - Twelfth son: Fujiwara no Kinsue (956-1029)
- Other children:
  - Daughter: Fujiwara no Hanshi (藤原繁子), wetnurse to Emperor Ichijō, mistress of Fujiwara no Michikane, wife of Taira no Korenaka (平惟仲)
  - Daughter: wife of Minamoto no Shigenobu (源重信)

Morosuke managed to marry his daughters to Emperor Murakami; the sons of his daughter Empress Anshi/Yasuko became Emperor Reizei and Emperor En'yū. The reigns of Reizei and En'yū are remarkable for quarrels among the members of the Fujiwara family. Koretada's daughter gave birth to Prince Morosada, who afterwards reigned as Emperor Kazan Kaneie's daughter was the mother of Okisada, who became Emperor Sanjo
