= Tenroku =

Period of Japanese history (970–973 CE)

Tenroku (天禄) was a Japanese era (年号, nengō, "year name") after Anna and before Ten'en. This period spanned the years from March 970 through March 973. The reigning emperors were Reizei-tennō (冷泉天皇) and En'yū-tennō (円融天皇).

== Change of era ==
- February 970 Tenroku gannen (天禄元年): The new era name was created to mark an event or series of events. The previous era ended and the new one commenced in Anna 3, on the 25th day of the 3rd month of 970.

== Events of the Tenroku era ==
- 970 (Tenroku 1, 1st month): Fujiwara no Arihira (藤原在衡) became sadaijin, and Fujiwara no Koretada (藤原 伊尹) became udaijin.
- 970 (Tenroku 1, 5th month): The sesshō (regent) and daijō-daijin Fujiwara no Saneyori (藤原実頼) died at the age of 71; and the udaijin Koretada then assumed his responsibilities.
- 970 (Tenroku 1, 10th month): The sadaijin Fujiwara no Arihira (藤原実頼) died at age 79.
- 971 (Tenroku 2, 3rd month): For the first time, a festival (matsuri) in honor of the kami of Iwashimizu Shrine was celebrated.
- 971 (Tenroku 2, in the 11th month): Koretada was created daijō-daijin; Minamoto no Kaneakira (源兼明) was made sadaijin; and Fujiwara no Yoritada (藤原頼忠) was named udaijin.
- April 4, 972 (Tenroku 3, 5th day of the 3rd month): Emperor En'yū's coronation at age 14 is organized by Koretada.
- 972 (Tenroku 3, 11th month): Koretada dies at age 49.

== Notes ==
Preceded by Anna	Era or nengō Tenroku; 970–973	Succeeded by Ten'en
