= Fujiwara no Michikane =

Kampaku Fujiwara no Michikane
- 藤原 道兼
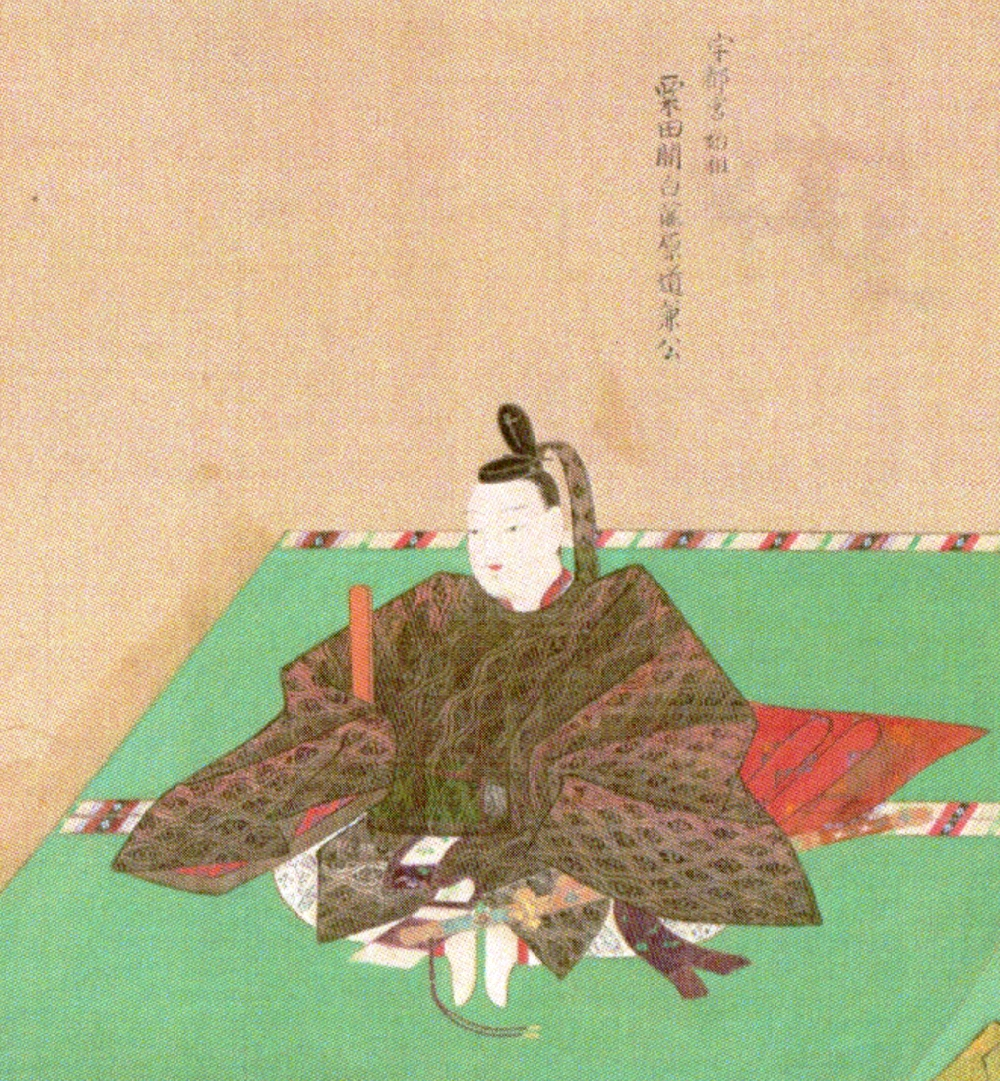

Personal details
- Born: 961
- Died: 995
- Parent: Fujiwara no Kaneie (father)

Fujiwara no Michikane (藤原 道兼; 961 – 995), was a Japanese statesman of the Heian period.

== Career ==
Michikane and his father, Kaneie, plotted to induce Emperor Kazan to abdicate the throne. Kazan had fallen deeply in love with Yoshiko, the daughter of Fujiwara no Tamemitsu. When Yoshiko died in childbirth, Kazan was distraught. Seeing an opportunity after Kazan attempted suicide, Michikane convinced Kazan to go away with him and become a Buddhist monk. Kazan agreed and in 986, the two of them sneaked out of the palace under the cover of night and went to the Gangyō-ji where Kazan officially took the priestly name of Nyūkaku. Michikane then returned and placed his nephew on the throne as Emperor Ichijō.

He was appointed udaijin in 994.

After the death of Fujiwara no Michitaka, his son Korechika expected to succeed him as Kampaku, instead, Ichijō appointed Michikane. Michikane died after seven days in the position, earning him the legacy as Nanoka no Kampaku (七日の関白), the seven-day regent.

== Genealogy ==
He was the father of Fujiwara no Kanetaka and Fujiwara no Sonshi.

Two clans later on claimed descent from Michikane: the Rusu and the Utsunomiya.
