= Eikan =

Period of Japanese history (983–985 CE)

Eikan (永観) was a Japanese era name (年号, nengō; lit. "year name") after Tengen and before Kanna. This period spanned the years from April 983 through April 985. The reigning emperors were En'yū-tennō (円融天皇) and Kazan-tennō (花山天皇).

== Change of era ==
- February 16, 983 Eikan gannen (永観元年)]: The new era name was created to mark an event or a number of events. The previous era ended and a new one commenced in Tengen 6, on the 15th day of the 4th month of 983.

== Events of the Eikan era ==
- October 6, 983 (Eikan 1, 27th day of the 8th month): In the 15th year of Emperor En'yu's reign (円融天皇15年), he abdicated; and the succession (senso) was received by a nephew. Shortly thereafter, Emperor Kazan is said to have acceded to the throne (sokui).
- September/October 983 (Eikan 1, 8th month): Chōnen, the Buddhist monk of the Tendai school embarked on a voyage to China accompanied by 5 or 6 disciples.

== Notes ==
Preceded by Tengen	Era or nengō Eikan; 983–985	Succeeded by Kanna
