= Fujiwara no Kanemichi =

Japanese statesman, courtier and politician

- Born: 925
- Died: December 20, 977
- Parents: Fujiwara no Morosuke (father)

Fujiwara no Kanemichi (藤原 兼通; 925 – December 20, 977), also known as Horikawa-dono and Tōtōmi-kō, was a Japanese statesman, courtier and politician during the Heian period.

== Career ==
Kanemichi served as a minister during the reign of Emperor En'yū. His chief rival was his younger brother, Kaneie, who was also raised to the position of regent during a different time frame.

- 972 (Tenroku 3, 11th month): Kanemichi is elevated to the concurrent offices of nadaijin and kampaku.
- 974 (Ten'en 2, 2nd month): Kanemichi is named Daijō Daijin.
- December 20, 977 (Jōgen 2, 8th day of the 11th month): Kanemichi dies at the age of 51.

== Genealogy ==
This member of the Fujiwara clan was the son of Morosuke. He was the second son. The Honda clan claims descent from him.

Kanemichi had four brothers: Kaneie, Kinsue, Koretada, and Tamemitsu.
