= Jōgen (Heian period) =

Period of Japanese history (976-978 AD)

Jōgen (貞元) was a Japanese era (年号, nengō; lit. "year name") after Ten'en and before Tengen. This period spanned the years from July 976 through November 978. The reigning emperor was En'yū-tennō (円融天皇).

== Change of era ==
- February 3, 976 Jōgen gannen (貞元元年): The new era name was created to mark an event or a number of events. The previous era ended and a new one commenced in Ten'en 4, on the 13th day of the 7th month of 976.

== Events of the Jōgen era ==
- June 11, 976 (Jōgen 1, 11th day of the 5th month): The Imperial Palace was destroyed by a great fire.
- December 20, 977 (Jōgen 2, 8th day of the 11th month): Fujiwara no Kanemichi dies at the age of 51.

== Notes ==
Preceded by Ten'en	Era or nengō Jōgen; 976–978	Succeeded by Tengen
