= Emperor Reizei =

Emperor of Japan from 967 to 969

Emperor Reizei 冷泉天皇
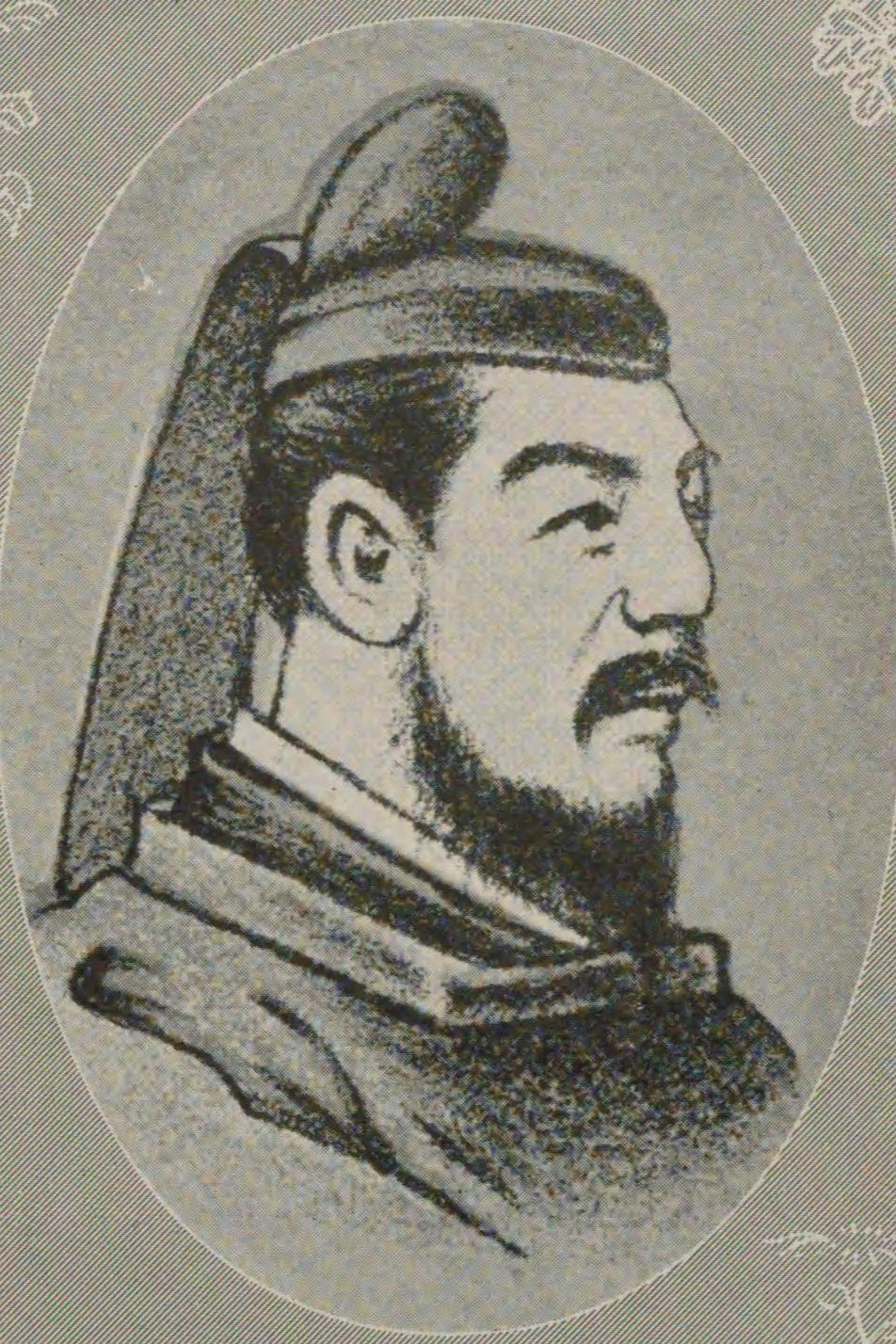

Emperor of Japan
- Reign: July 5, 967 – September 27, 969
- Enthronement: November 15, 967
- Predecessor: Murakami
- Successor: En'yū
- Born: June 12, 950; Gojo-tei 五条邸
- Died: November 21, 1011 (aged 61); Higashi Sanjo Palace (東三条第)
- Burial: Sakuramoto no misasagi (櫻本陵) (Kyoto)
- Spouse: Masako
- Issue: Princess Sōshi; Princess Sonshi; Emperor Kazan; Princess Mitsuko; Emperor Sanjō; Prince Tametaka; Prince Atsumichi
Posthumous name
- Tsuigō: Emperor Reizei (冷泉院 or 冷泉天皇)
- House: Imperial House of Japan
- Father: Emperor Murakami
- Mother: Fujiwara no Anshi

Emperor Reizei (冷泉天皇, Reizei-tennō; June 12, 950 – November 21, 1011) was the 63rd emperor of Japan, according to the traditional order of succession.

Reizei's reign spanned the years from 967 through 969, ending with his abdication and retirement.

== Biography ==
Before his ascension to the Chrysanthemum Throne, his personal name (his imina) was Norihira-shinnō (憲平親王).

Norihira-shinnō was the second son of Emperor Murakami. His mother, Empress Yasuko, was a daughter of minister of the right Fujiwara no Morosuke. Soon after his birth he was appointed as crown prince, displacing the Emperor's first-born son with the daughter of Fujiwara no Motokata. This decision was supposedly made under the influence of Morosuke and his brother Fujiwara no Saneyori who had seized power in the court. Motokata soon died, in despair at having lost the prospect of being grandfather to the next emperor. The malevolent influence of Motokata's vengeful spirit (怨霊, onryō) was blamed for Norihira-shinnō's mental illness, which resulted in Saneyori acting as regent for the duration of his short reign.

From ancient times, there have been four noble clans, the Gempeitōkitsu (源平藤橘). One of these clans, the Minamoto clan (源氏) are also known as Genji, and of these, the Reizei Genji (冷泉源氏) are descended from 63rd emperor Reizei.

== Events of Reizei's reign ==
Questions about mental illness made Norihira-shinnō's succession somewhat problematic.

In 967 his father Murakami died and Reizei ascended to the throne at the age of eighteen.

- July 5, 967 (Kōhō 4, 25th day of the 5th month): In the 16th year of Emperor Murakami's reign (村上天皇十六年), he died; and the succession (‘‘senso’’) was received by his second son. Shortly thereafter, Emperor Reizei is said to have acceded to the throne (‘‘sokui’’).
- 969 (Anna 2): Reizei abdicated; and he took the honorific title of Reizei-in Jōkō. His reign lasted for just two years; and he lived another 44 years in retirement.

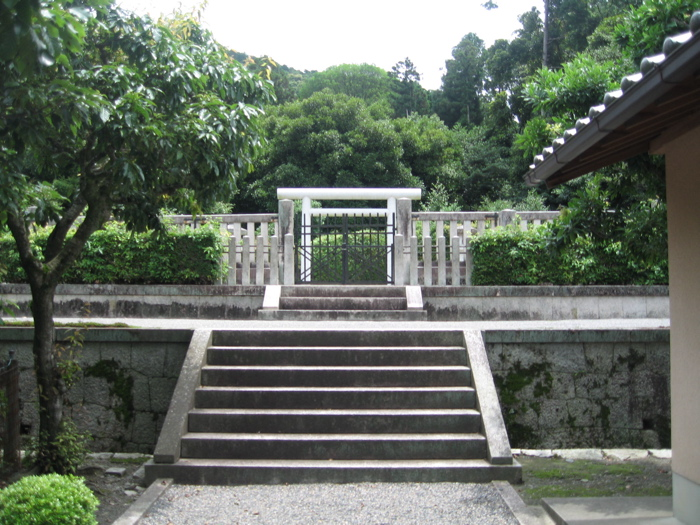
The tomb of Emperor Reizei, Kyoto (front view)

- November 21, 1011 (Kankō 8, 24th day of the 10th month): Daijō-tennō Reizei-in Jōkō died at age 62.

The actual site of Reizei's grave is known. This emperor is traditionally venerated at a memorial Shinto shrine (misasagi) at Kyoto.

The Imperial Household Agency designates this location as Reizei's mausoleum. It is formally named Sakuramoto no misasagi

=== Kugyō ===
Kugyō (公卿) is a collective term for the very few most powerful men attached to the court of the Emperor of Japan in pre-Meiji eras.

In general, this elite group included only three to four men at a time. These were hereditary courtiers whose experience and background would have brought them to the pinnacle of a life's career. During Go-Toba's reign, this apex of the Daijō-kan included:

- Kampaku, Ōno-no-miya Fujiwara no Saneyori (藤原実頼), 900–970.
- Daijō-daijin, Fujiwara Saneyori.
- Sadaijin, Minamoto no Takaakira (源高明) (relegated in 969 by Anna Incident)
- Sadaijin, Fujiwara Morotada (藤原師尹)
- Udaijin, Fujiwara Morotada (藤原師尹), 920–969.
- Naidaijin (not appointed)
- Dainagon, Fujiwara no Arihira (藤原在衡)
- Dainagon, Minamoto no Kaneakira (源兼明)
- Dainagon, Fujiwara no Koretada (藤原伊尹)

== Eras of Reizei's reign ==
The years of Reizei's reign are more specifically identified by more than one Japanese era name (年号, nengō):

- Kōhō (964–968)
- Anna (968–970)

== Consorts and children ==
Empress (Chūgū): Imperial Princess Masako (昌子内親王) later Kanon'in taigō (観音院太后), Emperor Suzaku’s daughter

- Adopted Son: Imperial Prince Nagahira (永平親王; 965–988)

Consort (Nyōgo): Fujiwara no Kaishi/Chikako (藤原懐子, 945–975), Fujiwara no Koretada’s daughter

- First Daughter: Imperial Princess Sōshi (宗子内親王; 964–986)
- Second Daughter: Imperial Princess Sonshi (尊子内親王; 966–985), 15th Saiin in Kamo Shrine 968–975; later, married to Emperor En'yū in 980
- First Son: Imperial Prince Morosada (師貞親王) later Emperor Kazan

Consort (Nyōgo): Fujiwara no Chōshi/Tōko (藤原超子; d.982), Fujiwara no Kaneie’s daughter

- Third Daughter: Imperial Princess Mitsuko (光子内親王; 973–975)
- Second Son: Imperial Prince Okisada (居貞親王) later Emperor Sanjō
- Third son: Imperial Prince Tametaka (為尊親王; 977–1002)
- Fourth Son: Imperial Prince Atsumichi (敦道親王; 981–1007)

Consort (Nyōgo): Fujiwara no Fushi/Yoshiko (藤原怤子), Fujiwara no Morosuke’s daughter

== Ancestry ==
Ancestors of Emperor Reizei

8. Emperor Uda (867-931)
4. Emperor Daigo (885-930)
9. Fujiwara no Inshi (d. 896)
2. Emperor Murakami (926-967)
10. Fujiwara no Mototsune (836-891)
5. Fujiwara no Onshi (885-954)
11. Princess Sōshi
1. Emperor Reizei
12. Fujiwara no Tadahira (880-949)
6. Fujiwara no Morosuke (909-960)
13. Minamoto no Shōshi
3. Fujiwara no Anshi (927-964)
14. Fujiwara no Tsunekuni
7. Fujiwara no Seishi (d. 943)

== Notes ==
Japanese Imperial kamon — a stylized chrysanthemum blossom

== See also ==
- Emperor of Japan
- List of Emperors of Japan
- Imperial cult
- Emperor Go-Reizei

Regnal titles
Preceded by Emperor Murakami	Emperor of Japan: Reizei; 967–969	Succeeded by Emperor En'yū
