= Ten'en =

Period of Japanese history (973–976 CE)

Ten'en (天延) was a Japanese era (年号, nengō, "year name") after Tenroku and before Jōgen. This period spanned the years from December 973 through July 976. The reigning emperor was En'yū-tennō (円融天皇).

== Change of era ==
- February 6, 973 Ten'en gannen (天延元年): The new era name was created to mark an event or a number of events. The previous era ended and a new one commenced in Tenroku 4, on the 20th day of the 12th month of 973.

== Events of the Ten'en era ==
- May 28, 973 (Ten'en 1, 24th day of the 4th month): A fire broke out in a Minamoto compound located near the Imperial Palace. The fire could not be contained; and more than 300 houses were reduced to cinders. The guard was doubled around the Emperor's residence.
- 974 (Ten'en 2, 2nd month): Fujiwara no Kanemichi was named Daijō-daijin; and he was given permission to travel to court in a carriage.
- 974 (Ten'en 2, 10th month): The emperor received a gift of horses from Korea.
- 975 (Ten'en 3, 8th month): A comet was seen in the night sky.

== Notes ==
Preceded by Tenroku	Era or nengō Ten'en; 973–976	Succeeded by Jōgen
