= Ōwa =

Period of Japanese history (961–964 CE)

Ōwa (応和) was a Japanese era name (年号, nengō; "year name") after Tentoku and before Kōhō. This period spanned the years from February 961 through July 964. The reigning emperor was Murakami-tennō (村上天皇).

== Change of era ==
- January 20, 961 Ōwa gannen (応和元年): The new era name was created to mark an event or series of events. The previous era ended and the new one commenced in Tentoku 5, on the 16th day of the 2nd month.

== Events of the Ōwa era ==
- 961 (Ōwa 1, 11th month): Emperor Murakami moved into a newly constructed palace. The former palace had to be re-built after the destructive fire of Tentoku 5 (960).
- 962 (Ōwa 2, 2nd month): The emperor sent deputies to make offerings at a number of Shinto shrines—at Ise, at Kamo, at Mizunoo, at Hirano, and at Kasuga.
- 962 (Ōwa 2, 8th month): Fujiwara no Saneyori went to offer prayers at the Iwashimizu Shrine; and many from the Fujiwara clan followed his example.

== Notes ==
| Preceded by Tentoku | Era or nengō Ōwa; 961–964 | Succeeded by Kōhō |
