= Emperor Murakami =

Emperor of Japan from 946 to 967

Emperor Murakami 村上天皇
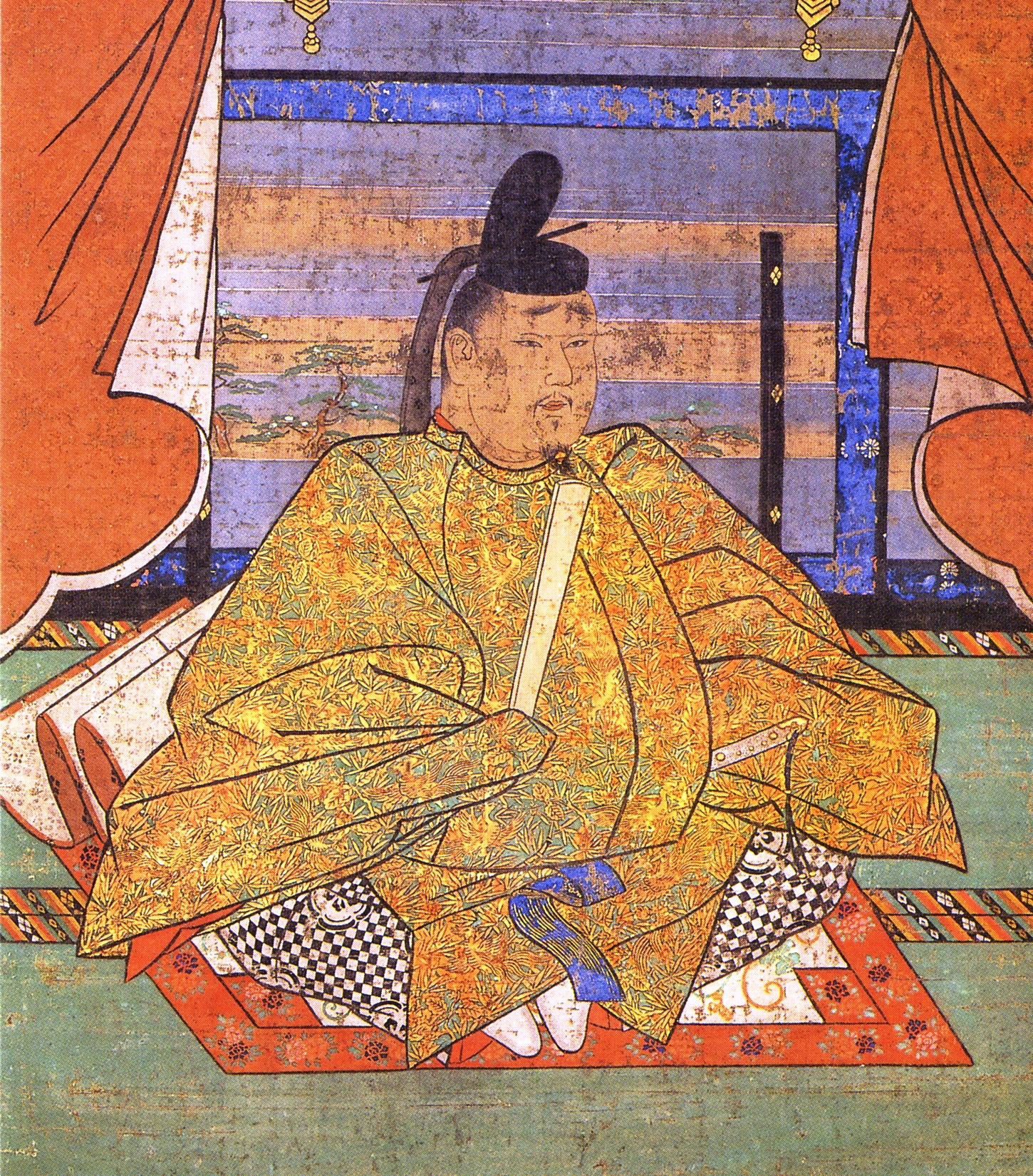
- Portrait from the Momoyama period

Emperor of Japan
- Reign: 23 May 946 – 5 July 967
- Enthronement: 31 May 946
- Predecessor: Suzaku
- Successor: Reizei
- Born: 14 July 924; Heian Kyō (Kyōto)
- Died: 5 July 967 (aged 42); Seiryōden (清凉殿) of Inner Palace
- Burial: Murakami no misasagi (村上陵) (Kyōto)
- Spouse: Fujiwara no Anshi
- Issue more...: Emperor Reizei; Emperor En'yū
Posthumous name
- Tsuigō: Emperor Murakami (村上天皇)
- House: Imperial House of Japan
- Father: Emperor Daigo
- Mother: Fujiwara no Onshi

Emperor Murakami (村上天皇, Murakami-tennō; 14 July 924 – 5 July 967) was the 62nd emperor of Japan, according to the traditional order of succession.

Murakami's reign spanned the years from 946 to his death in 967.

== Biography ==
Before he ascended to the Chrysanthemum Throne, his personal name (imina) was Nariakira-shinnō (成明親王).

Nariakira-shinnō was the 14th son of Emperor Daigo, and the younger brother of Emperor Suzaku by another mother.

Murakami had ten Empresses and Imperial consorts and 19 Imperial sons and daughters.

== Events of Murakami's reign ==
In 944, he was appointed crown prince and ascended the throne two years later.

- 16 May 946 (Tengyō 9, 13th day of the 4th month): In the 16th year of the reign of Emperor Suzaku (朱雀天皇十六年), the emperor abdicated; and the succession (the senso) was received by his younger brother, Nariakira-shinnō.
- 31 May 946 (Tengyō 9, 28th day of the 4th month): Shortly thereafter, Emperor Murakami, who was 21 years old, acceded to the throne (the sokui).

Murakami's maternal uncle Fujiwara no Tadahira remained as the Sessho regent until 949. After the death of Tadahira, there was no regent and although contemporaries praised Murakami as the emperor who governed the state directly, in reality the Fujiwara clan seized power and ruled Japan. The brothers Fujiwara no Saneyori and Fujiwara no Morosuke became the de facto rulers of Japan.

- 23 October 949 (Tenryaku 3, 29th day of the 9th month): The former-Emperor Yōzei died at the age of 82.
- 951 (Tenryaku 5): The emperor ordered the compilation of Gosen Wakashū; this work was undertaken by the Five Men of the Pear Chamber under his patronage.
- 6 September 952 (Tenryaku 6, 15th day of the 8th month): The former-Emperor Suzaku died at the age of 30.
- 16 October 960 (Tentoku 4, 23rd day of the 9th month): The Imperial palace burned down, the first time it had been ravaged by fire since the capital was removed from Nara to Heian-kyō in 794.

Murakami was a central figure in Heian period culture. He was also a skilled flute and koto (Japanese harp) player.

- 5 July 967 (Kōhō 4, 25th day of the 5th month): The former-Emperor Murakami died at the age of 42.

The actual site of Murakami's grave is known. This emperor is traditionally venerated at a memorial Shinto shrine (misasagi) at Kyoto.

The Imperial Household Agency designates this location as Murakami's mausoleum. It is formally named Murakami no misasagi

=== Kugyō ===
Kugyō (公卿) is a collective term for the very few most powerful men attached to the court of the Emperor of Japan in pre-Meiji eras.

In general, this elite group included only three to four men at a time. These were hereditary courtiers whose experience and background have brought them to the pinnacle of a life's career. During Murakami's reign, this apex of the Daijō-kan included:

- Kampaku, Fujiwara no Tadahira (藤原忠平), 880–949.
- Daijō-daijin, Fujiwara no Tadahira (藤原忠平).
- Sadaijin, Ono-no Miya Fujiwara no Saneyori (藤原実頼), 900–970.
- Udaijin, Fujiwara no Saneyori (藤原実頼).
- Udaijin, Fujiwara no Morosuke (藤原師輔), 908–960.
- Udaijin, Fujiwara no Akitada (藤原顕忠).
- Udaijin, Minamoto no Taka-akira (源高明).
- Nadaijin
- Dainagon

== Eras of Murakami's reign ==
The years of murakami's reign are more specifically identified by more than one era name or nengō.

- Tengyō (938–947)
- Tenryaku (947–957)
- Tentoku (957–961)
- Ōwa (961–964)
- Kōhō (964–968)

== Consorts and children ==
Empress (Chugu): Fujiwara no Anshi/Yasuko (藤原安子; 927–964), Fujiwara no Morosuke‘s daughter

- Prince: (946)
- First Daughter: Imperial Princess Shōshi (承子内親王; 948–951)
- Second son: Imperial Prince Norihira (憲平親王) later Emperor Reizei
- Fourth Son: Imperial Prince Tamehira (為平親王; 952–1010)
- Seventh Daughter: Imperial Princess Sukeko (輔子内親王; 953–992), 32nd Saiō in Ise Shrine 968–969
- Ninth Daughter: Imperial Princess Shishi (資子内親王; 955–1015)
- Seventh Son: Imperial Prince Morihira (守平親王) later Emperor En'yu
- Princess: (962)
- Tenth Daughter: Imperial Princess Senshi (選子内親王; 964–1035), 16th Saiin in Kamo Shrine 975–1031

Consort (Nyōgo): Princess Kishi (徽子女王; 929–985), Imperial Prince Shigeakira's daughter

- Fourth Daughter: Imperial Princess Kishi/Noriko (規子内親王; 949–986), 34th Saiō in Ise Shrine 975–984
- Eighth Son: (962)

Consort (Nyōgo): Princess Sōshi/Takako (荘子女王; 930–1008), Imperial Prince Yoakira's daughter

- Sixth daughter: Imperial Princess Rakushi (楽子内親王; 952–998), 31st Saiō in Ise Shrine 955–967
- Ninth Son: Imperial Prince Tomohira (具平親王; 964–1009), called Nochi no Chūshoō (後中書王)

Consort (Nyōgo): Fujiwara no Jutsushi/Nobuko (藤原述子; 933–947), Fujiwara no Saneyori‘s daughter

Consort (Nyōgo): Fujiwara no Hōshi (藤原芳子; d. 967), Fujiwara no Morotada‘s daughter

- Sixth son: Imperial Prince Masahira (昌平親王; 956–961)
- Tenth son: Imperial Prince Nagahira (永平親王; 965–988)

Court Attendant (Koui): Minamoto no Kazuko (源計子), Minamoto no Moroakira's daughter

- Second Daughter: Imperial Princess Rishi (理子内親王; 948–960)
- Fifth Daughter: Imperial Princess Seishi (盛子内親王; d. 998), married to Fujiwara no Akimitsu

Court Attendant (Koui): Fujiwara no Seihi (藤原正妃; d. 967), Fujiwara no Arihira's daughter

- Third Daughter: Imperial Princess Hoshi (保子内親王; 949–987), married to Fujiwara no Kaneie
- Third Prince: Imperial Prince Munehira (致平親王; 951–1041)
- Fifth Prince: Imperial Prince Akihira (昭平親王; 954–1013)

Court Attendant (Koui): Fujiwara no Sukehime (藤原祐姫), Fujiwara no Motokata's daughter

- First Son: Imperial Prince Hirohira (広平親王; 950–971)
- Eighth Daughter: Imperial Princess Shūshi (緝子内親王; d. 970)

Court Attendant (Koui): Fujiwara no Shūshi (藤原脩子), Fujiwara no Asahira's daughter

Court Attendant (Koui): Fujiwara no Yūjo (藤原有序), Fujiwara no Arisuke's daughter

Court Lady: Fujiwara no Tōshi/Nariko (藤原登子; d. 975), Fujiwara no Morosuke‘s daughter; later married Imperial Prince Shigeakira

== Ancestry ==
Ancestors of Emperor Murakami

8. Emperor Kōkō (830-867)
4. Emperor Uda (867-931)
9. Princess Hanshi (833-900)
2. Emperor Daigo (885-930)
10. Fujiwara no Takafuji (838-900)
5. Fujiwara no Inshi (d. 896)
11. Miyaji no Tsurako
1. Emperor Murakami
12. Fujiwara no Nagara (802-856)
6. Fujiwara no Mototsune (836-891)
13. Fujiwara no Otoharu
3. Fujiwara no Onshi (885-954)
14. Prince Saneyasu (831-872)
7. Princess Sōshi

== Notes ==
Japanese Imperial kamon – a stylized chrysanthemum blossom

== See also ==
- Emperor of Japan
- List of Emperors of Japan
- Imperial cult
- Emperor Go-Murakami

Regnal titles
Preceded by Emperor Suzaku	Emperor of Japan: Murakami; 946–967	Succeeded by Emperor Reizei
