= Fujiwara no Saneyori =

Japanese statesman, courtier and politician

Senior First Rank Fujiwara no Saneyori 藤原 実頼
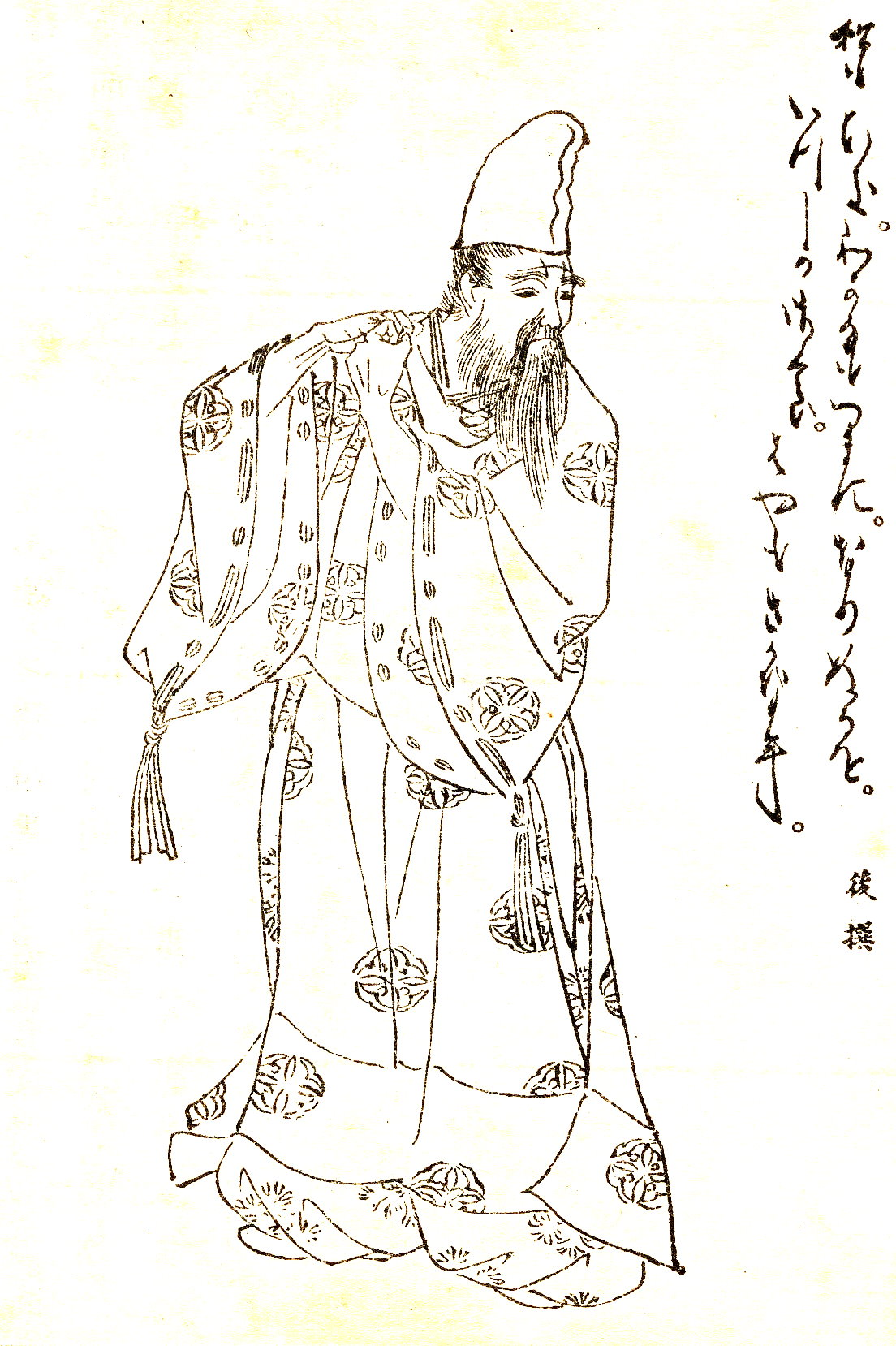
- Illustration by Kikuchi Yōsai, from Zenken Kojitsu

Imperial Regent of Japan
- In office 31 July 967 – 24 June 970
- Monarchs: Reizei; En'yū
- Preceded by: Fujiwara no Tadahira
- Succeeded by: Fujiwara no Koretada

Personal details
- Born: 900
- Died: 24 June 970 (aged 69–70) Heian Kyō (Kyōto)
- Parent(s): Fujiwara no Tadahira (father); Minamoto no Junshi (mother)

Fujiwara no Saneyori (藤原 実頼; 900 – 24 June 970), also known as Onomiya-dono, was a Japanese statesman, courtier and politician during the Heian period.

== Career ==
He was a minister during the reigns of Emperor Reizei and Emperor En'yū.

- 2 May 944 (Tengyō 7, 7th day of the 4th month): Saneyori was elevated to the position of udaijin in the Imperial court hierarchy.
- 19 May 947 (Tenryaku 1, 26th day of the 4th month): Saneyori is promoted to the positions of sadaijin and grand general of the left.
- 949 (Tenryaku 3, 1st month): Saneyori and his brother Morosuke shared the duties of daijō-daijin during a period of Fujiwara no Tadahira's ill-health.
- 958 (Tentoku 2, 3rd month): Saneyori was granted special permission to travel in a wheeled vehicle.
- 26 March 963 (Ōwa 3, 28th day of the 2nd month): Saneyori presided at the coming of age ceremonies for Norihira-shinnō (憲平親王) who would later become Emperor Reizei.
- 31 July 967 (Kōhō 4, 22nd day of the 6th month): Saneyori began serving as kampaku when Emperor Reizei assumed the throne in 967.
- 27 September 969 (Anna 2, 13th day of the 8th month): Saneyori was appointed sesshō (regent).
- 24 June 970 (Tenroku 1, 18th day of the 5th month): Saneyori died at age 70; and he was posthumously elevated to the first class in rank.

After his death, Saneyori's nephew Koretada assumed his duties when he was named sesshō after his death.

== Genealogy ==
This member of the Fujiwara clan was the son of Fujiwara no Tadahira. Saneyori was the eldest son. He had two brothers: Morosuke and Morotada.
