= Kanna (era) =

Period of Japanese history (985–987 CE)

Kanna (寛和, Kanwa) was a Japanese era name (年号, nengō, "year name") after Eikan and before Eien. This period spanned the years from April 985 through April 987. The reigning emperors were Kazan-tennō (花山天皇) and Ichijō-tennō (一条天皇).

== Change of era ==
- January 24, 985 Kanna gannen (寛和元年): The new era name was created to mark an event or a number of events. The previous era ended and a new one commenced in Eikan 3, on the 27th day of the 4th month of 985.

== Events of the Kanna era ==
- 986 (Kanna 2, 6th month): Kazan abdicated, and took up residence at Kazan-ji where he became a Buddhist monk. His new priestly name was Nyūkaku.
- August 23, 986 (Kanna 2, 16th day of the 7th month): Iyasada-shinnō was appointed as heir and crown prince at age 11. This followed the convention that two imperial lineages took the throne in turn, although Emperor Ichijō was in fact Iyasada's junior. He thus gained the nickname Sakasa-no moke-no kimi (the imperial heir in reverse). When Emperor Kanzan abandoned the world for holy orders, this grandson of Kaneie ascended to the throne as Emperor Ichijō.

== Notes ==
Preceded by Eikan	Era or nengō Kanna; 985–987	Succeeded by Eien
