= Fujiwara no Koretada =

Japanese statesman, courtier, politician and waka-poet

Senior First Rank Fujiwara no Koretada 藤原 伊尹
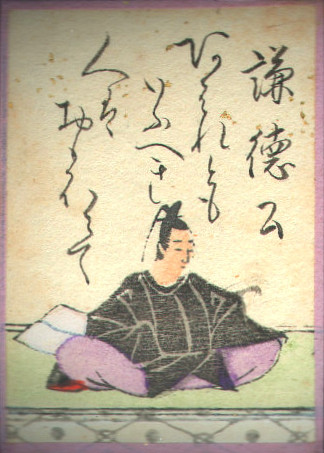

Imperial Regent of Japan
- In office 26 June 970 – 1 December 972
- Monarch: En'yū
- Preceded by: Fujiwara no Saneyori
- Succeeded by: Fujiwara no Kanemichi

Personal details
- Born: 924
- Died: 9 December 972 (aged 47–48) Heian Kyō (Kyōto)
- Spouse: Princess Keiko
- Parent(s): Fujiwara no Morosuke (father); Fujiwara no Moriko (mother)

Fujiwara no Koretada/Koremasa (藤原 伊尹; 924 – 9 December 972), also known as Ichijō Sesshō, was a Japanese statesman, courtier, politician and waka-poet during the Heian period. His poems were published in "The Collected Poems of the First Ward Regent", Ichijo Sessho Gyoshu, and in Hyakunin Isshu (poem No. 45). He was handsome and wise, and his personality was flashy.

He is also known as Kentoku-kō (謙徳公).

== Career ==
Emperor Murakami named Koretada conservator of Japanese poetry in 951.

Koretada served as a minister during the reign of Emperor En'yū.

- 7 March 970 (Tenroku 1, 27th day of the 1st month): Koretada is named udaijin.
- 26 June 970 (Tenroku 1, 20th day of the 5th month): After the death of Fujiwara no Saneyori, Koretada is named sesshō (regent).
- 22 November 971 (Tenroku 2, 2nd day of the 11th month): Koretada assumes the office of daijō daijin.
- 23 January 972 (Tenroku 3, 5th day of the 1st month): The enthronement of Emperor En'yu is supervised by Koretada.
- 9 December 972 (Tenroku 3, 1st day of the 11th month): Koretada died at age 49; and he was posthumously raised to first class rank. He was granted the posthumous title of Mikawa-kō. His body was buried in Tenanji Temple.

The immediate consequence of Koretada's death was a period of intense rivalry between his brothers Kanemichi and Kaneie.

== Genealogy ==
This member of the Fujiwara clan was the son of Morosuke. He was the oldest son; and became head of the Hokke branch of the clan after his uncle Saneyori died in 970.

He was born between Fujiwara no Morosuke and Fujiwara no Moriko.

Koretada had four brothers: Kaneie, Kanemichi, Kinsue, and Tamemitsu.
