= Kōhō =

Period of Japanese history (964–968 CE)

Kōhō (康保) was a Japanese era name (年号, nengō, "year name") after Ōwa and before Anna. This period spanned the years from July 964 through August 968. The reigning emperors were Murakami-tennō (村上天皇) and Reizei-tennō (冷泉天皇).

== Change of era ==
- February 16, 964 Kōhō gannen (康保元年): The new era name was created to mark an event or series of events. The previous era ended and the new one commenced in Ōwa 4, on the 10th day of the 7th month of 964.

== Events of the Kōhō era ==
- 964 (Kōhō 1, 4th month): The Empress Fujiwara no Ansi died. The empress' younger sister married the emperor's older brother, Shigeakira-shinnō; and shortly afterwards, he died. Then his wife also died. In his grief, the emperor neglected his duty to care for the government.
- 965 (Kōhō 2, 4th month): The udaijin Fujiwara no Akihira died at the age of 68.
- 965 (Kōhō 2, 12th month): The emperor celebrated his 40th birthday.
- July 5, 967 (Kōhō 4, 25th of the 5th month): The emperor died at age 42 years, having reigned 21 years in total.

== Notes ==
Preceded by Ōwa	Era or nengō Kōhō; 964–968	Succeeded by Anna
