= Fujiwara no Onshi =

Fujiwara no Onshi 藤原穏子

Empress consort of Japan
- Tenure: May 14, 923 – March 19, 931

Empress dowager of Japan
- Tenure: March 19, 931 – 946

Grand empress dowager of Japan
- Tenure: May 29 , 946 – February 9, 954
- Born: Fujiwara no Onshi (藤原 穏子); 885
- Died: February 9, 954 (aged 68–69); Heian Kyō (Kyōto)
- Burial: Uji Mausoleum, Uji, Kyoto Prefecture, Japan
- Spouse: Emperor Daigo
- Issue: Prince Yasuakira; Princess Koushi; Emperor Suzaku; Emperor Murakami
- House: Fujiwara Hokke (by birth); Imperial House of Japan (by marriage)
- Father: Fujiwara no Mototsune
- Mother: Daughter of Imperial Prince Saneyasu

Fujiwara no Onshi (藤原 穏子; 885 – February 9, 954) was an empress consort of Japan. The youngest daughter of Kampaku Fujiwara no Mototsune, she was the wife of Emperor Daigo and the mother of emperor Suzaku and Murakami.

== Biography ==
Onshi was the younger half-sister of Fujiwara no Onshi (藤原 温子; 882 – 907), who was the empress consort of Emperor Uda and the adoptive mother of Emperor Daigo.

In 930, her spouse, the retired Emperor Daigo, as well as her father-in-law, the retired Emperor Uda, died, leaving Fujiwara no Onshi in a very influential position as the mother of the young Emperor Suzaku as well as the Crown Prince Murakami. This position allowed her to become the Head of the Imperial Family, and she institutionalized the role of the Emperor's mother and her office as synonymous with the caretaker of a child emperor.

She continued to live with Emperor Suzaku after he became an adult and married, retaining her influence. During the reign of her next son, Emperor Murakami, she maintained peace within the Imperial House by acting as a mediator between her sons, the emperor and the retired emperor. In 950, she secured the appointment of prince Noriki as crown prince.

== Notes ==
Japanese royalty
Preceded by Princess Seishi	Empress consort of Japan; 923–931	Succeeded by Fujiwara no Anshi
Preceded by Princess Hanshi	Empress dowager of Japan; 931–946	Succeeded by Fujiwara no Anshi (granted title posthumously)
Preceded by Fujiwara no Akirakeiko	Grand empress dowager of Japan; 946–954	Succeeded by Fujiwara no Anshi (granted title posthumously)
