= 980s =

Decade

The 980s decade ran from January 1, 980, to December 31, 989.

== Events ==
=== 980 ===
==== By place ====
====== Europe ======
- Peace is concluded between Emperor Otto II (the Red) and King Lothair III (or Lothair IV) at Margut, ending the Franco-German war of 978–980. Lothair renounces his claim on Lower Lorraine, while Otto promises to recognize Lothair's son Louis V as the rightful heir of the West Frankish Kingdom.
- June 11 – Vladimir I (the Great), grand prince of Kyiv, consolidates the Kievan realm from modern Ukraine to the Baltic Sea. Vladimir is proclaimed ruler (knyaz) of all Kievan Rus'.
- Fall – Otto II sets off on his first expedition to Italy. He leaves the government in the hands of Archchancellor Willigis. Otto is accompanied by his wife, Empress Theophanu.
- Winter – Otto II celebrates Christmas with his family at Ravenna. He receives the Iron Crown of Lombardy as the King of Italy.
- King Harald Bluetooth orders the construction of the Viking ring fortress of Trelleborg (modern Denmark).

====== England ======
- Viking raids from Scandinavia threaten the southern English coast after a pause of 25 years. Hampshire and the Isle of Thanet are ravaged.

====== Arabian Empire ======
- The Dari dialect (which will become the major language of Persia) is developed in the royal courts of the Samanid Empire in Central Asia.

====== Africa ======
- The Kilwa Sultanate, centered at Kilwa (an island off modern Tanzania), is founded by Ali ibn al-Hassan Shirazi, Persian prince of Shiraz.

==== By topic ====
====== Religion ======
- Notker (or Notger), Frankish Benedictine monk and bishop, founds the Prince-Bishopric of Liège (modern Belgium) which will remain an independent state inside the Holy Roman Empire for more than 800 years.

=== 981 ===
==== By place ====
====== Europe ======
- Spring – Emperor Otto II (the Red) leads the imperial court to Rome, making the city his imperial capital, and receives nobles from all parts of Western Europe. Otto makes plans to conquer Byzantine Italy.
- Fall – Otto II departs with an expeditionary force from Rome, and invades Apulia (Southern Italy) to punish the Saracens. He demands a fleet from Pisa, and imposes a trade embargo against Venice.
- Al-Mansur, the de facto ruler of Al-Andalus, conquers and razes the city of Zamora, as part of his effort to seize the Christian-dominated north of the Iberian Peninsula.

====== Asia ======
- Summer – Seongjong ascends the throne of Goryeo (Korea) after the death of his brother-in-law (and cousin), king Gyeongjong.
- The first recorded Mahamastakabhisheka ceremony, of the sacred 57 foot (17 m) high monolithic statue of Bahubali, is performed.
- The Gommateshwara statue is built by Chavundaraya, minister and commander of the Ganga dynasty, in India (approximate date).

==== By topic ====
====== Exploration ======
- Erik the Red leaves Norway, to survey west of Iceland in Viking longships, that carry nearly 700 people with cattle, horses, and other necessities for starting a colony on the island. Erik finds land and calls it Greenland.

====== Religion ======
- Spring – Pope Benedict VII dissolves the Slavic bishopric of Merseburg, after conferring with Otto II. He issues an encyclical, forbidding the exaction of money for the conferral of any Holy Order (known as simony).

====== Commerce ======
- The first commercially made shaving soap sells for 3 dirhams (0.3 dinars).

=== 982 ===
==== By place ====
====== Europe ======
- Summer – Emperor Otto II (the Red) assembles an imperial expeditionary force at Taranto, and proceeds along the gulf coast towards Calabria. In the meantime, Emir Abu'l-Qasim (Kalbid) of the Emirate of Sicily declares a Holy War (jihad) against the Germans, but his forces retreat when he notices the unexpected strength of Otto's troops (not far from Rossano).
- July 13 (or 14) – Battle of Stilo: Abu'l-Qasim is cornered by the imperial German forces led by Otto II at Cape Colonna (south of Crotone). After a violent clash, the German heavy cavalry destroys the Muslim centre, killing al-Qasim in the initial fighting. The Saracens hold together and draw Otto into a trap, encircling and defeating his forces (killing around 4,000 men).
- King Harald Bluetooth invades Norway, pillaging southwest Norway all the way to Stad, where he encounters Haakon Sigurdsson (the de facto ruler of Norway) and his army. He flees back to Denmark, ending the invasion.

====== Asia ======
- 'Adud al-Dawla, emir (king of kings) of the Buyid Dynasty, concludes a 10-year peace treaty with the Byzantine Empire. He establishes what will soon become the most important hospital of Baghdad.
- The Indian Rashtrakuta Dynasty ends as its last ruler Indra IV commits Sallekhana (the Jain religious practice of voluntarily starving oneself to death).
- October 13 – Chinese Emperor Jingzong dies in camp during a hunting trip after a 13-year reign. He is succeeded by his 11-year-old son, Shengzong, as ruler of the Khitan-led Liao Dynasty. His mother, Empress Dowager Xiao Yanyan becomes the regent.

==== By topic ====
====== Exploration ======
- Erik the Red establishes the first Viking colonies in Greenland (see 981).

====== Religion ======
- Adalbert becomes bishop of Prague after the death of Dětmar (or Dietmar).

=== 983 ===
==== By place ====
====== Europe ======
- Summer – Diet of Verona: Emperor Otto II (the Red) declares war against the Byzantine Empire and the Emirate of Sicily. He assembles a large expeditionary force for a renewal of an invasion in Calabria (Southern Italy). Otto gifts the Rheingau ("Rhine District") to the Archbishopric of Mainz during the 'Veronese donation'. Otto III is elected king of Germany and Italy.
- Great Slav Rising: The Polabian Slavs (Wends), mainly Lutici and Obotrite tribes living east of the Elbe River revolt against Christianity and their subjugation to the German (former East Frankish) realm of the Holy Roman Empire. They invade northern Germany, sacking the cities of Havelberg, Brandenburg and Hamburg.
- King Harald Bluetooth rebels against the overlordship of Otto II. A Danish Viking army under his son Sweyn Forkbeard invades the March of Schleswig – along the northern border of modern Denmark. The Sorb Slavs in northern Germany overrun and conquer the March of Zeitz (Marca Geronis) from Saxon control.
- December 7 – Otto II dies from a fever in his palace at Rome after a 10-year reign. He is succeeded by his 3-year-old son, Otto III.
- December 25 – Otto III is crowned at Aachen by Archbishops Willigis of Mainz and John X of Ravenna. The Holy Roman Empire comes under the regency of his mother, Empress consort Theophanu.

====== Arabian Empire ======
- March 26 – 'Adud al-Dawla, ruler (emir) of the Buyid Dynasty, dies after a 34-year reign. He is succeeded by his 20-year-old son Samsam al-Dawla, who is recognised by the Abbasid Caliphate. During al-Dawla's rule his dominions are divided through civil war and revolts (until 987).
- Fall – Fatimid troops under the defecting Hamdanid governor of Homs, Bakjur, attack Aleppo (modern Syria), but are repulsed through the intervention of the Byzantine army. Bardas Phokas (the Younger) sacks the city, while Bakjur flees to Fatimid territory in Egypt.

====== China ======
- Emperor Sheng Zong of the Khitan-led Liao Dynasty leads an expeditionary force against the Zubu after they killed their own khan and begin to act in defiance of the Khitan.
- One of the Four Great Books of Song, the encyclopedia Imperial Readings of the Taiping Era is completed in 1,000 volumes, of 4.7 million written Chinese characters.

==== By topic ====
====== Religion ======
- July 10 – Pope Benedict VII dies after a 9-year reign. Otto II secures the election of the imperial chancellor and appoints John XIV as the 136th pope of the Catholic Church.

=== 984 ===
==== By place ====
====== Europe ======
- Spring – German boy-king Otto III (4 years old) is seized by the deposed Henry II, Duke of Bavaria ("the Wrangler"), who has recovered his duchy and claims the regency as a member of the Ottonian Dynasty. But Henry is forced to hand over Otto to his mother, empress consort Theophanu.
- King Ramiro III of León loses his throne to Bermudo II (the rival king of Galicia), who also becomes ruler of the entire Kingdom of León (modern-day Spain).

====== Japan ======
- Fall – Emperor En'yū abdicates the throne in favor of his 16-year-old son Kazan after a 15-year reign. En'yū retires and becomes a Buddhist priest.

==== By topic ====
====== Technology ======
- Qiao Weiyue, a Chinese engineer, innovates the first known use of the double-gated canal pound lock during the Song dynasty, for adjusting different water levels in segments of the Grand Canal in China.

====== Religion ======
- August 20 – Pope John XIV dies a prisoner in the Castel Sant'Angelo at Rome after a 1-year reign, having either been murdered or starved to death.
- Anti-Pope Boniface VII returns from Constantinople and gains support from the powerful Roman Crescentii family. He takes hold of the papal throne.

=== 985 ===
==== By place ====
====== Europe ======
- Summer – Henry II (the Wrangler) is restored as duke of Bavaria by Empress Theophanu and her mother-in-law Adelaide at an Hoftag assembly in Rohr (Thuringia). King Otto III (5-years old) remains under the regency of the two empresses in the Holy Roman Empire and in the Kingdom of Italy.
- Battle of Fýrisvellir: King Eric the Victorious defeats a Swedish Viking army under Styrbjörn the Strong (his nephew) near Uppsala.
- July 6 – The city of Barcelona is sacked by Moorish troops under Al-Mansur, the de facto ruler of Al-Andalus (modern-day Spain).

====== England ======
- Lady Wulfrun, an Anglo-Saxon noblewoman, is granted land by King Æthelred II (the Unready). She founds Heantune that later becomes the city of Wolverhampton in the West Midlands.

====== Asia ======
- Raja Raja Chola I (considered by many as the greatest emperor of the Chola Empire) becomes ruler of the Chola Dynasty. During his reign he expands his domains beyond South India.

==== By topic ====
====== Exploration ======
- Greenland is colonized by the Icelandic Viking Erik the Red (according to legend, but has been established as approximately correct – see History of Greenland).

====== Religion ======
- July 20 – Anti-Pope Boniface VII dies under suspicious circumstances at Rome. He is succeeded by John XV as the 137th pope of the Catholic Church.
- Amalfitan Benedictines found the only Latin Christian monastery on Mount Athos with the support of John the Iberian. The monastery will last until 1287.

=== 986 ===
==== By place ====
====== Byzantine Empire ======
- August 17 – Battle of the Gates of Trajan: Emperor Basil II leads a Byzantine expeditionary force (30,000 men) against the Bulgarians to capture the fortress city of Sredets. After a siege of 20 days, Basil is forced to retreat from the Sofia Valley towards the town of Ihtiman (through a passage known as the Gate of Trajan). The Bulgarians under Tsar Samuel ambush and defeat the Byzantine forces. Only the elite Varangian Guard escapes with heavy casualties and leads Basil to safety through secondary routes.

====== Europe ======
- March 2 – King Lothair III (or Lothair IV) dies after a 32-year reign at Laon. He is succeeded by his 19-year-old son Louis V as ruler of the West Frankish Kingdom.
- Summer: Al-Mansur, the de facto ruler of Al-Andalus, continues his effort in the north of the Iberian Peninsula and plunders the city of Coimbra (modern Portugal).
- Empress Theophanu, accompanied by the 6-year-old King Otto III and Henry II of Bavaria, leads a campaign against Bohemia and the Slavs on the Elbe frontier.
- Mieszko I, duke (de facto) ruler of Poland, pledges his allegiance to Otto III and the Holy Roman Empire. He promises assistance in Otto's war against the Slavs.
- Battle of Hjörungavágr: The Earls of Lade under Haakon Sigurdsson (the Powerful) defeat a Danish invasion force led by the Jomsvikings in western Norway.
- Winter – King Harald II (Bluetooth) dies after a 28-year reign (driven into exile). He is succeeded by his son Sweyn Forkbeard as ruler of Denmark and Norway.

====== Arabian Empire ======
- Winter – Sabuktigin, emir of the Ghaznavid Dynasty, invades India. He expands the emirate between the Kabul Valley and the Indus River after defeating King Jayapala.

====== Asia ======
- Emperor Kazan abdicates the throne after a political struggle from the Fujiwara family. He is succeeded by his 6-year-old cousin Ichijō as the 66th emperor (tennō) of Japan.
- Summer – Chi Go Pass Campaign: The Song Dynasty sends armies on three fronts against the Liao Dynasty in the Sixteen Prefectures, but they are defeated on all fronts.

==== By topic ====
====== Exploration ======
- Bjarni Herjólfsson, a Norse-Icelandic merchant captain and explorer, becomes the first inhabitant of the Old World to discover the mainland of the Americas.

====== Literature ======
- One of the Four Great Books of Song, the Chinese encyclopedia Finest Blossoms in the Garden of Literature is finished, with a total of 1,000 volumes.

=== 987 ===
==== By place ====
====== Byzantine Empire ======
- February 7 – Bardas Phokas (the Younger) and Bardas Skleros, two members of the military elite, begin a wide-scale rebellion against Emperor Basil II. They overrun Anatolia, and Phokas declares himself Emperor. Basil applies for military assistance from Prince Vladimir the Great, ruler of Kievan Rus', who agrees to help him and sends a Varangian army (6,000 men).

====== Europe ======
- Al-Mansur, the de facto ruler of Al-Andalus, occupies the city of Coimbra (modern Portugal).
- July 3 – After the last Carolingian king of West Francia, Louis V, had died in May, Hugh Capet is crowned king at Noyon.
- December – The 15-year-old Robert (the son of Hugh Capet) is crowned co-ruler of France around Christmas at Orléans.
- The population of Bari revolts against the Byzantine Empire.

====== Africa ======
- The Zirid Dynasty fails to reconquer the western part of the Maghreb (Land of Atlas), which they have recently lost to the Umayyad Caliphate.

=== 988 ===
==== By place ====
====== Byzantine Empire ======
- Fall – Emperor Basil II, supported by a contingent of 6,000 Varangians (the future Varangian Guard), organizes the defences of Constantinople to meet a threat from the insurgents, Bardas Phokas the Younger and Bardas Skleros. Basil crosses the Bosphorus, and leads a surprise attack on the rebel camp of Kalokyros Delphinas, at Chrysopolis. Delphinas is captured and executed, either by crucifixion or by impalement (approximate date).

====== Europe ======
- April 1 – 16-year old Robert II of France ("Robert the Pious") is married to the much older Rozala (the widow of Arnulf II). The marriage is arranged by Robert's father, King Hugh Capet, to secure the loyalty of the County of Flanders.
- Borrell II, count of Barcelona, does not renew his allegiance to Hugh Capet. He becomes a de facto independent ruler, and starts minting its own currency – this will be confirmed legally by the Treaty of Corbeil (1258).
- Charles, Duke of Lower Lorraine (younger brother of the late King Lothair of France), revolts against Hugh Capet. He conquers the city of Laon in northern France with support of his half-brother Arnulf (archbishop of Reims).
- Almanzor (Al-Mansur), de facto ruler of Al-Andalus, continues his offensive against the kingdoms of León and Castile. King Bermudo II escapes to Zamora; the city resists for four days, but is finally sacked and captured.

====== China ======
- The Liao dynasty adopts civil service examinations in the 'Southern Chancellery', based on Tang dynasty models (approximate date).

==== By topic ====
====== Religion ======
- Grand Prince Vladimir the Great, ruler of Kievan Rus', marries Anna Porphyrogenita (sister of Basil II) and converts to Christianity. He is baptized at Cherson in the Crimea, taking the Christian name of Basil (in honor of his brother-in-law). Vladimir returns in triumph to Kyiv, and begins the Christianization of Kievan Rus' to the Eastern Orthodox Church.
- The Mezhyhirskyi Monastery (located on the Dnieper River) is founded by Michael I, first metropolitan bishop of Kiev. He arrives with Greek monks from Constantinople.

====== Economy ======
- March 18 – The city of Odense (located on the island of Funen) in Denmark is founded. King Otto III grants trade rights and to the neighbouring settlements.

=== 989 ===
==== By place ====
====== Byzantine Empire ======
- Emperor Basil II uses his contingent of 6,000 Varangians to help him defeat Bardas Phokas (the Younger), who suffers a seizure during the siege of Abydos (threatening to blockade the Dardanelles). Phokas dies, ending the revolt and threat to Constantinople. Upon Phokas' death, the other rebel leader Bardas Skleros (who is captured and blinded) yields to Basil's superior forces.

====== Europe ======
- Summer – Charles, Duke of Lower Lorraine, captures the city of Reims by treachery of its new archbishop, Arnulf (the illegitimate son of the late King Lothair III). King Hugh I (Capet) demands that Pope John XV discipline Arnulf. But John XV, not wishing to defy Empress Theophanu, refuses.
- Winter – Theophanu arrives with her son, King Otto III in Rome to meet John XV. Crescentius II (the Younger) offers his submission to the Holy Roman Empire, in return for which she confirms his title as patrician of Rome.

==== By topic ====
====== Religion ======
- Council of Charroux: French bishops under the patronage of William IV, duke of Aquitaine, declare the first Peace of God (or Pax Dei). This agreement grants immunity from violence to noncombatants (peasants and clergy) who can not defend themselves.

====== Art ======
- October 25 – The Hagia Sophia at Constantinople is struck by a great earthquake, causing the collapse of the western dome arch. Basil II asks the Armenian architect Trdat, the creator of the Cathedral of Ani, to direct the repairs.

====== Education ======
- Sankore Madrasah, at this stage a mosque, is founded in Timbuktu (modern-day Mali).

====== Astronomy ======
- September – Halley's Comet is at perihelion.

== Significant people ==
- At-Ta'i
- Pope John XV

== Births ==
980

- July 5 – Mokjong, king of Goryeo (Korea) (d. 1009)
- July 15 – Ichijō, emperor of Japan (d. 1011)
- Abu Mansur al-Baghdadi, Persian scholar (d. 1037)
- Abu 'Ubayd al-Juzjani, Persian physician (d. 1070)
- Adalbero, German nobleman (approximate date)
- Avicenna, Persian polymath (approximate date)
- Baldwin IV (the Bearded), French nobleman (d. 1035)
- Bardo, German abbot and archbishop (approximate date)
- Benedict VIII, pope of the Catholic Church (d. 1024)
- Einar Thambarskelfir, Norwegian nobleman (d. 1050)
- Ekkehard IV, Swiss chronicler (approximate date)
- Farrukhi Sistani, Persian poet (approximate date)
- Geoffrey I, French nobleman (d. 1008)
- Herman I, German nobleman (approximate date)
- Humbert I, founder of the House of Savoy (approximate date)
- Pope Nicholas II, pope of the Catholic Church (d. 1061)
- Olof Skötkonung, king of Sweden (approximate date)
- Otto III, Holy Roman Emperor (d. 1002)
- Sviatopolk I, Grand Prince of Kiev (approximate date)
- Tancred of Hauteville, Norman nobleman (d. 1041)
- Theodora Porphyrogenita, Byzantine empress (d. 1056)
- Xuedou Chongxian, Chinese Buddhist monk (d. 1052)

981

- Abu'l-Qasim al-Husayn ibn Ali al-Maghribi, Arab statesman (d. 1027)
- Giovanni Orseolo, Venetian nobleman (d. 1006)
- Li Deming, Chinese general and rebel leader (d. 1032)
- Theodora, Empress of the Eastern Roman Empire (d. 1056)
- Torstein Knarresmed, Norse Viking warrior (approximate date)
- Vladivoj, duke of Bohemia (approximate date)

982

- Atiśa, Bengali Buddhist religious leader (d. 1054)
- Dirk III (or Theodoric), count of Holland (d. 1039)
- Judith of Brittany, duchess of Normandy (d. 1017)

983

- Abd al-Rahman Sanchuelo, Umayyad chief minister (d. 1009)
- Anthony of Kiev, Rus' monk and saint (d. 1073)
- Gunnlaugr Ormstunga, Icelandic poet (approximate date)
- Odo II, French nobleman and pretender (d. 1037)
- Wulfnoth Cild, Anglo-Norse nobleman (approximate date)

984

- Abu al-Qasim Muhammad ibn Abbad, founder of the Abbadid dynasty (d. 1042)
- Choe Chung, Korean Confucian scholar and poet (d. 1068)
- Emma of Normandy, noblewoman, queen consort of England (twice), Denmark and Norway (d. 1052; approximate date)

985

- August 13 – Al-Hakim bi-Amr Allah, Fatimid caliph (d. 1021)
- Adalbert, margrave of Austria (approximate date)
- Boniface III, margrave of Tuscany (approximate date)
- Gilbert Buatère, Norman nobleman (approximate date)
- Gisela (or Gizella), queen of Hungary (d. 1065)
- John Gualbert, Italian monk and abbot (d. 1073)
- Hamza ibn 'Ali ibn-Ahmad, founding leader of the Druze
- Maria of Amalfi, Lombard duchess and regent
- Osmond Drengot, Norman nobleman (approximate date)
- Pilgrim, archbishop of Cologne (approximate date)
- Radbot, German nobleman (approximate date)
- Rodulfus Glaber, French monk and chronicler (d. 1047)
- Theobald II, French nobleman (approximate date)
- Wazo, bishop of Liège (approximate date)
- Zhao Yuanyan, prince of the Song Dynasty (d. 1044)

986

- Al-Qushayri, Persian Sufi scholar and theologian (d. 1072)
- Æthelstan Ætheling, son of Æthelred II (the Unready) (d. 1014)
- Bezprym (or Besfrim), duke of Poland (approximate date)
- Constance of Arles, French queen (approximate date)
- Lê Long Đĩnh, emperor of the Lê Dynasty (d. 1009)
- Poppo, archbishop of Trier (approximate date)
- Reginald I, count palatine of Burgundy (d. 1057)

987

- Al-Mahdi al-Husayn, Zaidi imam of Yemen (d. 1013)
- Ibn Hayyan, Moorish writer and historian (d. 1075)
- Li, imperial consort of the Song Dynasty (d. 1032)
- Liu Yong, Chinese poet of the Song Dynasty (d. 1053)

988

- Ali ibn Ridwan, Arab physician and astrologer (d. 1061)
- Matilda of Swabia, German noblewoman (d. 1032)
- Minamoto no Yoriyoshi, Japanese nobleman (d. 1075)
- Nōin, Japanese monk and waka poet (d. 1051)
- Pang Ji, chancellor of the Song dynasty (d. 1063)
- Shōshi, empress consort of Japan (d. 1074)
- Stephen I, king of Croatia (approximate date)
- Tilopa, Indian tantric practitioner (d. 1069)

989

- September 5 – Fan Zhongyan, chancellor of the Song Dynasty (d. 1052)
- Adémar de Chabannes, French monk and historian (d. 1034)
- Al-Jayyānī, Arab scholar and mathematician (d. 1079)
- Chaghri Beg, co-ruler of the Seljuk Empire (d. 1060)
- Regelinda, margravine of Meissen (approximate date)

== Deaths ==
980

- February 15 – Berthold, German nobleman (approximate date)
- September 28 – Minamoto no Hiromasa, Japanese nobleman (b. 918)
- Dado (or Dodon), Italian nobleman (approximate date)
- Domnall ua Néill (or Donal O'Neill), High King of Ireland
- Eoghan Ua Cathain, abbot of Clonfert (Ireland)
- Gunnhild, Norwegian Viking queen (approximate date)
- Ibn Khalawayh, Persian scholar and grammar (or 981)
- Liu Chang, emperor of Southern Han (b. 942)
- Yaropolk I, Grand Prince of Kiev (approximate date)

981

- February 12 – Ælfstan, bishop of Ramsbury
- June 20 – Adalbert, archbishop of Magdeburg
- July 9 – Ramiro Garcés, king of Viguera (Spain)
- July 12 – Xue Juzheng, Chinese scholar-official and historian
- August 13 – Gyeongjong, king of Goryeo (Korea) (b. 955)
- Abu'l-Faraj Muhammad, Buyid nobleman and statesman
- Amlaíb Cuarán, Viking king of Scandinavian York
- Ibn Khalawayh, Persian scholar and grammar (or 980)
- Pandulf Ironhead, prince of Benevento and Capua
- Slavník, founder of the Slavník dynasty (Bohemia)
- Wigger I, German nobleman (approximate date)
- Zhao Defang, prince of the Song dynasty (b. 959)

982

- January 2 – Dětmar (or Dietmar), bishop of Prague
- July 13 (or 14) – Battle of Stilo:
  - Abu'l-Qasim, Kalbid emir of Sicily
  - Gunther, margrave of Merseburg
  - Henry I, bishop of Augsburg
  - Landulf IV, Lombard prince
  - Pandulf II, Lombard prince
- October 13 – Jing Zong, emperor of the Liao Dynasty (b. 948)
- November 26 – Matilda, queen of Burgundy (or 981)
- Abu'l Haret Muhammad, Farighunid ruler (approximate date)
- Abu'l-Husain Utbi, Samanid vizier
- Al-Hasan ibn Ubayd Allah ibn Tughj, Ikhshidid prince and regent
- Eadwine, ealdorman of Sussex (approximate date)
- Gao Huaide, Chinese general (b. 926)
- Indra IV, Rashtrakuta ruler (India)
- Jordan, bishop of Poland (or 984)
- Otto I, duke of Swabia and Bavaria (b. 954)
- Senorina, Galician abbess and saint
- Shabbethai Donnolo, Jewish physician (b. 913)
- Wang Pu, Chinese chancellor (b. 922)

983

- March 26 – 'Adud al-Dawla, ruler of the Buyid Dynasty (b. 936)
- July 10 – Benedict VII, pope of the Catholic Church
- December 7 – Otto II, Holy Roman Emperor (b. 955)
- Aed Ua Dubhda, king of Uí Fiachrach (Ireland)
- Ælfhere, Anglo-Saxon ealdorman (approximate date)
- Antony III (the Studite), patriarch of Constantinople
- Ibrahim ibn Marzuban, ruler of the Sallarid Dynasty
- Minamoto no Muneyuki, Japanese nobleman and poet
- Minamoto no Shitagō, Japanese waka poet (b. 911)
- Mu'ayyad al-Dawla, ruler of the Buyid Dynasty (b. 942)

984

- July 7 – Crescentius the Elder, Roman politician and aristocrat
- July 18 – Dietrich I, bishop of Metz
- August 1 – Æthelwold, bishop of Winchester
- August 20 – John XIV, pope of the Catholic Church
- September 9 – Warin, archbishop of Cologne
- Buluggin ibn Ziri, ruler (emir) of the Zirid Dynasty
- Domnall Claen, king of Leinster (Ireland)
- Edith of Wilton, English princess and abbess
- Eochaid Ua Floinn, Irish poet (approximate date)
- Gerberga, Frankish queen (approximate date)
- Jordan, bishop of Poland (or 982)
- Miró III, count of Cerdanya and Besalú (b. 920)
- Ragnhild Eriksdotter, Norse Viking noblewoman
- Shi Shouxin, Chinese general (b. 928)

985

- January 31 – Ryōgen, Japanese monk and abbot (b. 912)
- June 26 – Ramiro III, king of León (Spain) (b. 961)
- July 20 – Boniface VII, antipope of the Catholic Church
- August 25 – Dietrich of Haldensleben, German margrave
- Basil Lekapenos, Byzantine chief minister (b. 925)
- Chen Hongjin, Chinese warlord and general (b. 914)
- Herbert III (the Old), Frankish nobleman (b. 910)
- Hywel ap Ieuaf, king of Gwynedd (Wales)
- Judith, duchess regent of Bavaria (b. 925)
- Kishi Joō, Japanese female waka poet (b. 929)
- Marzuban ibn Muhammad, Shaddadid emir
- Muirgus mac Domnaill, king of Uí Maine (Ireland)
- Rikdag, margrave of Meissen (Germany)
- Tornike Eristavi, Georgian general and monk
- Harold II (Bluetooth), king of Denmark and Norway

986

- March 2 – Lothair III, king of the West Frankish Kingdom (b. 941)
- May 25 – Abd al-Rahman al-Sufi, Persian astronomer (b. 903)
- August – Yang Ye, Chinese general and governor (jiedushi)
- August 15 – Minnborinus, Irish missionary and abbot
- unknown date
  - Bahram ibn Ardashir al-Majusi, Buyid official and general
  - Cadwallon ab Ieuaf, king of Gwynedd (Wales)
- probable
  - Æthelstan Mannessune, English landowner
  - Bobo, Frankish warrior and pilgrim

987

- January 10 – Pietro I Orseolo, doge of Venice (b. 928)
- March 30 – Arnulf II (the Younger), Frankish nobleman
- May 21 – Louis V, king of the West Frankish Kingdom
- July 13 – Abu'l-Fawaris Ahmad ibn Ali, Ikhshidid governor
- July 21 – Geoffrey I (Greymantle), Frankish nobleman
- September 8 (approximate date) – Adalbert I, Count of Vermandois, Frankish nobleman
- November 16 – Shen Lun, Chinese scholar-official

988

- February 13 – Adalbert Atto, Lombard nobleman
- March 988 – Ishaq ibn al-Muqtadir, Arab prince
- April 28 – Adaldag, archbishop of Bremen
- May 6 – Dirk II, count of Frisia and Holland
- May 19 – Dunstan, archbishop of Canterbury (b. 909)
- October 7 – Qian Chu, king of Wuyue (d. 929)
- Bagrat II, prince of Tao-Klarjeti (Georgia)
- Guerech, Frankish nobleman (approximate date)
- Ieuaf (Idwal ab Idwal), king of Gwynedd (Wales)
- Judith of Hungary, queen of Poland (approximate date)
- Kalokyros Delphinas, Byzantine general (or 989)
- Sumbat II, prince of Tao-Klarjeti (Georgia)
- Vigrahapala II, ruler of the Pala Empire (India)
- Yelü Sha, Chinese general and statesman

989

- January 23 – Adalbero, archbishop of Reims
- April 13 – Bardas Phokas, Byzantine general
- October 5 – Henry III, duke of Bavaria (b. 940)
- Chavundaraya, Indian general, architect and poet
- Chen Tuan, Chinese Taoist monk and philosopher
- Ch'oe Sung-no, Korean politician and poet (b. 927)
- Fujiwara no Korenari, Japanese courtier (b. 953)
- Fujiwara no Yoritada, Japanese nobleman (b. 924)
- Glúniairn, Norse-Gael king of Dublin (approximate date)
- Gofraid mac Arailt, Norse-Gael king of the Isles (Hebrides)
- Kalokyros Delphinas, Byzantine general (or 988)
- Kiurike I, king of Tashir-Dzoraget (Armenia)
- Pan, Chinese princess and wife of Zhen Zong (b. 968)
- Sharaf al-Dawla, Buyid emir of Kerman and Fars (b. 960)
