= 982 =

Calendar year

982 in various calendars
- Gregorian calendar: 982; CMLXXXII
- Ab urbe condita: 1735
- Armenian calendar: 431; ԹՎ ՆԼԱ
- Assyrian calendar: 5732
- Balinese saka calendar: 903–904
- Bengali calendar: 388–389
- Berber calendar: 1932
- Buddhist calendar: 1526
- Burmese calendar: 344
- Byzantine calendar: 6490–6491
- Chinese calendar: 辛巳年 (Metal Snake); 3679 or 3472 — to — 壬午年 (Water Horse); 3680 or 3473
- Coptic calendar: 698–699
- Discordian calendar: 2148
- Ethiopian calendar: 974–975
- Hebrew calendar: 4742–4743
- Hindu calendars
- Vikram Samvat: 1038–1039
- Shaka Samvat: 903–904
- Kali Yuga: 4082–4083
- Holocene calendar: 10982
- Iranian calendar: 360–361
- Islamic calendar: 371–372
- Japanese calendar: Tengen 5 (天元５年)
- Javanese calendar: 883–884
- Julian calendar: 982; CMLXXXII
- Korean calendar: 3315
- Minguo calendar: 930 before ROC 民前930年
- Nanakshahi calendar: −486
- Seleucid era: 1293/1294 AG
- Thai solar calendar: 1524–1525
- Tibetan calendar: ལྕགས་མོ་སྦྲུལ་ལོ་ (female Iron-Snake); 1108 or 727 or −45 — to — ཆུ་ཕོ་རྟ་ལོ་ (male Water-Horse); 1109 or 728 or −44

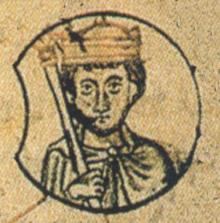
Otto II (the Red) (955–983)

Year 982 (CMLXXXII) was a common year starting on Sunday of the Julian calendar.

== Events ==
=== By place ===
==== Europe ====
- Summer – Emperor Otto II (the Red) assembles an imperial expeditionary force at Taranto, and proceeds along the gulf coast towards Calabria. In the meantime, Emir Abu'l-Qasim (Kalbid) of the Emirate of Sicily declares a Holy War (jihad) against the Germans, but his forces retreat when he notices the unexpected strength of Otto's troops (not far from Rossano).
- July 13 (or 14) – Battle of Stilo: Abu'l-Qasim is cornered by the imperial German forces led by Otto II at Cape Colonna (south of Crotone). After a violent clash, the German heavy cavalry destroys the Muslim centre, killing al-Qasim in the initial fighting. The Saracens hold together and draw Otto into a trap, encircling and defeating his forces (killing around 4,000 men).
- King Harald Bluetooth invades Norway, pillaging southwest Norway all the way to Stad, where he encounters Haakon Sigurdsson (the de facto ruler of Norway) and his army. He flees back to Denmark, ending the invasion.

==== Asia ====
- 'Adud al-Dawla, emir (king of kings) of the Buyid Dynasty, concludes a 10-year peace treaty with the Byzantine Empire. He establishes what will soon become the most important hospital of Baghdad.
- The Indian Rashtrakuta Dynasty ends as its last ruler Indra IV commits Sallekhana (the Jain religious practice of voluntarily starving oneself to death).
- October 13 – Chinese Emperor Jingzong dies in camp during a hunting trip after a 13-year reign. He is succeeded by his 11-year-old son, Shengzong, as ruler of the Khitan-led Liao Dynasty. His mother, Empress Dowager Xiao Yanyan becomes the regent.

=== By topic ===
==== Exploration ====
- Erik the Red establishes the first Viking colonies in Greenland (see 981).

==== Religion ====
- Adalbert becomes bishop of Prague after the death of Dětmar (or Dietmar).

== Births ==
- Atiśa, Bengali Buddhist religious leader (d. 1054)
- Dirk III (or Theodoric), count of Holland (d. 1039)
- Judith of Brittany, duchess of Normandy (d. 1017)

== Deaths ==
- January 2 – Dětmar (or Dietmar), bishop of Prague
- July 13 (or 14) – Battle of Stilo:
  - Abu'l-Qasim, Kalbid emir of Sicily
  - Gunther, margrave of Merseburg
  - Henry I, bishop of Augsburg
  - Landulf IV, Lombard prince
  - Pandulf II, Lombard prince
- October 13 – Jing Zong, emperor of the Liao Dynasty (b. 948)
- November 26 – Matilda, queen of Burgundy (or 981)
- Abu'l Haret Muhammad, Farighunid ruler (approximate date)
- Abu'l-Husain Utbi, Samanid vizier
- Al-Hasan ibn Ubayd Allah ibn Tughj, Ikhshidid prince and regent
- Eadwine, ealdorman of Sussex (approximate date)
- Gao Huaide, Chinese general (b. 926)
- Indra IV, Rashtrakuta ruler (India)
- Jordan, bishop of Poland (or 984)
- Otto I, duke of Swabia and Bavaria (b. 954)
- Senorina, Galician abbess and saint
- Shabbethai Donnolo, Jewish physician (b. 913)
- Wang Pu, Chinese chancellor (b. 922)
