= Ermengarde-Gerberga of Anjou =

French Countess

Ermengarde of Anjou
- Born: c. 956
- Died: c. 1024
- Noble family: Ingelger
- Spouses: Conan I of Rennes; William II of Angoulême
- Issue Detail: Judith of Brittany; Geoffrey I, Duke of Brittany; Judicael
- Father: Geoffrey I, Count of Anjou
- Mother: Adele of Meaux

Ermengarde of Anjou (c. 956 - c. 1024) (Note: She is called Ermengarde in northern [French] sources however at least one early southern source calls her Gerberga. Angevins were known to give daughters two names as evidenced by her aunt, called Adelaide-Blanche. See: Bachrach, 'Henry II and the Angevin Tradition', Albion, Vol. 16, No. 2, (1984), p. 117 n. 35; Crisp, 'Consanguinity and the Saint-Aubin Genealogies, Haskins Society Journal 14 (2005), p. 114; also: Bachrach, ""Fulk Nerra, (1993), p. 42.) was the Countess of Rennes, Regent of Brittany (992–994) and also Countess of Angoulême.

== Life ==
Ermengarde-Gerberga was born c. 956, the daughter of Geoffrey I, Count of Anjou and Adele of Meaux. She married Conan I of Rennes, Count of Rennes, in 973. Her husband Conan of Rennes opposed her father and brother Fulk even though the marriage was apparently designed to form a political alliance between Anjou and Brittany. Even after Conan had been killed by Fulk at the Battle of Conquereuil in 992, and during the period 992-994 when Ermengarde was Regent for their son Geoffrey, she remained loyal to her brother Fulk III, Count of Anjou. In 992, following the interests of her brother, and functioning as Regent, she accepted Capetian over-lordship for Rennes while rejecting that of Odo I, Count of Blois.

About 1000 her brother Fulk III arranged his widowed sister to marry, secondly, William II of Angoulême, one of his close allies.

== Issue ==
Ermengarde married Conan I 'le Tort' Count of Rennes, she had the following children:

- Judith (982–1017), married Richard II, Duke of Normandy.
- Geoffrey I, Duke of Brittany, the eventual heir to Conan I.
- Judicael, count of Porhoët (died 1037).
- Hernod.

William II 'Taillefer' Count of Angoulême, married Gerberga and had the following children:

- Alduin II, Count of Angoulême (d. 1032), married Alaisia de Gasçogne.
- Geoffrey, Count of Angoulême (d.1048), married 1st Petronille d'Archiac, 2nd Anceline.
- Fulk of Angoulême, married Aynors.
- Odon (flourished c. 1030).
- Arnauld (died young).
- William (died young).

== Notes ==
Ermengarde-Gerberga of Anjou House of Ingelger
Royal titles
Preceded by Aremburge of Ancenis	Duchess consort of Brittany	Succeeded by Hawise of Normandy
