= William II of Angoulême =

Count of Angoulême

William II Taillefer (c. 952 – March 1028), numbered William II (as the second with the sobriquet Taillefer) or William IV (as the fourth William in his family), was the Count of Angoulême from 987. He was the son of Count Arnald II Manzer and grandson of Count William Taillefer I. He stood at the head of the family which controlled not only the Angoumois, but also the Agenais and part of Saintonge. By the time of his death he was "the leading magnate in [the west] of Aquitaine[, but his] eminence ... proved temporary and illusory," evaporating on his death in succession squabbles, revolts and the predations of his erstwhile allies. The principal sources covering William's career are Ademar of Chabannes and the anonymous Historia pontificum et comitum Engolismensium.

Between 994 and 1000 William married Ermengarde-Gerberga, widow of Conan I of Brittany and sister of Fulk III of Anjou, who held some castles in Saintonge and Poitou from William as fiefs (pro bene fico). William was perhaps countering the growing strength of the Counts of La Marche in northern Aquitaine since their family succeeded to the County of Périgord, previously dominated by Angoulême, in 975. Fulk was also an ally of Duke William V of Aquitaine, nominal suzerain of Angoulême, and William Taillefer entered into their alliance through marriage. It is also probable that Fulk saw William as a potential ally against the duke and his county of Angoulême as providing a bulwark against aggressions aimed at Fulk's recent acquisition of Saintes and its citadel, the Capitolium. William, exercising the secular control of the church typical of this era, gave the abbacy of Saint-Cybard and later the Bishopric of Angoulême to Grimoard, a brother of Islo, who was both allied with Fulk by marriage and serving as bishop in Fulk's city of Saintes.

Count William aided the duke against Boso II of La Marche and in return the duke supported the count's extension of his authority into the Bordelais. William was regularly present with the duke's court from about 1000 until October 1010, when an important meeting involving the duke, King Robert II of France, King Sancho III of Navarre and Duke Sancho VI of Gascony took place at the church of Saint Jean d'Angély. His absence from this meeting probably indicates the growing enmity between Duke William and Fulk of Anjou.

Although his fiefs (honores) had initially dominated the border between Saintonge and Poitou (where he subinfeudated some to Fulk), by 1024 William was exercising authority over all Saintonge. In Poitou William controlled the viscounty of Melle and its strongly fortified castrum (citadel). On one occasion William granted outright a church he owned to "his faithful [man]" Iterius, which illustrates how the feudal practice of granting lands in benefice had not completely overtaken the south of France. In 1020 William of Angoulême furthered his influence in Gascony by marrying his son to a daughter of Sancho VI.

On 6 March 1025 a major assembly of Aquitanian prelates and barons met to discuss the claim of Duke William's son, William the Fat, for the Kingdom of Italy. William Taillefer and his eldest son were present. On 1 October 1026 William left on a pilgrimage to the Holy Sepulchre. He travelled through Hungary and Slavonia, even though these regions were generally avoided at that time by pilgrims, since they had only recently been converted to Christianity, according to Ademar.

William died in March 1028 and was buried in the monastery of Saint-Cybard. An assembly of the principes et nobiles of Angoulême, Périgord and Saintonge met to judge the woman accused of poisoning him. William was succeeded at Angoulême by his eldest son, Alduin II, whose younger brother Geoffrey quarreled with him over the inheritance in Bordelais. Revolts broke out in Saintonge, where within a decade the Angoulêmes' authority had lapsed completely.
