= Adelaide of Vermandois =

Adelaide of Vermandois may refer to:

- Adele of Meaux (c. 935 – c. 982), French noblewoman also known as Adelaide
- Adelaide, Countess of Vermandois (died 1120)
