= Battle of Conquereuil =

Coordinates: 47°37′31″N 1°45′0″W

The Battle of Conquereuil was fought on June 27, 992 AD between the Bretons under Conan I, Duke of Brittany (Note: Duke Conan I was also the Count of Rennes) and the Angevins under Fulk the Black. (Note: Fulk the Black was Conan I's brother-in-law.)

== Siege of Nantes ==
Duke Conan had the Breton city of Nantes under siege, when he learned that Fulk was marching with an army to relieve the city. Conan raised the siege and began marching his troops back in the direction of Rennes to face Fulk.

Once Conan realized that his army could not outrun Fulk, Conan halted at Conquereuil and prepared the battlefield, digging pits and ditches which were flooded by the water of nearby swamps and then hidden by covering them lightly with sod, and behind this prepared earthworks which had their flanks secured by the swamps.

== Uncertain Outcomes ==
The Angevins attacked, and Breton troops lured the Angevin knights into the flooded pits by feigning flight. The Bretons then counterattacked and drove the Angevins back in disarray. The Bretons apparently considered the battle won, but this was premature. Fulk reorganized his army, attacked the Bretons again, and routed them, killing Conan in the process.

Another version of the story suggests that the Breton counterattack was successful and drove the Angevins back in disarray. In the midst of a Breton pursuit, Conan removed his armour because it was hot, and some Angevin knights in a wood saw him, charged the unarmoured duke, and killed him, turning the battle decisively in the favor of the Angevins.

== Bibliography ==
- Bachrach, Bernard S. (1993). Fulk Nerra, the Neo-Roman Consul, 987-1040. University of California Press.
- Bachrach, Bernard S. (2006). Rogers, Clifford J.; DeVries, Kelly; France, John (eds.). "Debate:Verbruggen's "Cavalry" and the Lyon-Thesis". Journal of Medieval Military History. IV. Boydell Press: 137–163. doi:10.1515/9781846154812-009. ISBN 978-1-84615-481-2.
