= Conan I of Rennes =

Duke of Brittany from 990 to 992

- Duke of Brittany
- Died: 27 June 992; Conquereuil, Kingdom of France
- Noble family: Rennes
- Spouse: Ermengarde-Gerberga of Anjou
- Issue Detail: Judith of Brittany; Geoffrey I, Duke of Brittany; Judicael
- Father: Judicael Berengar

Conan I (died 27 June 992), nicknamed Le Tort (The Crooked), was the Duke of Brittany from 990 to his death.

== Life ==
=== Count to Duke ===
Conan was the son of Judicael Berengar, succeeding his father as Count of Rennes in 970.

Conan assumed the title of Duke of Brittany in the spring of 990 following his attack on Nantes and the subsequent death of Count Alan. As Duke, his rule succeeded the Regency that governed Brittany during the life of Drogo and the fractured rule of Brittany after Drogo's death by his illegitimate brothers Hoël and Guerech, and the latter's son Alan. The fractured rule over Brittany resulted in a short vacancy in the title Duke of Brittany. Conan I had to ally himself with Odo I, Count of Blois in order to defeat Judicael Berengar before he could assume the title of Duke.

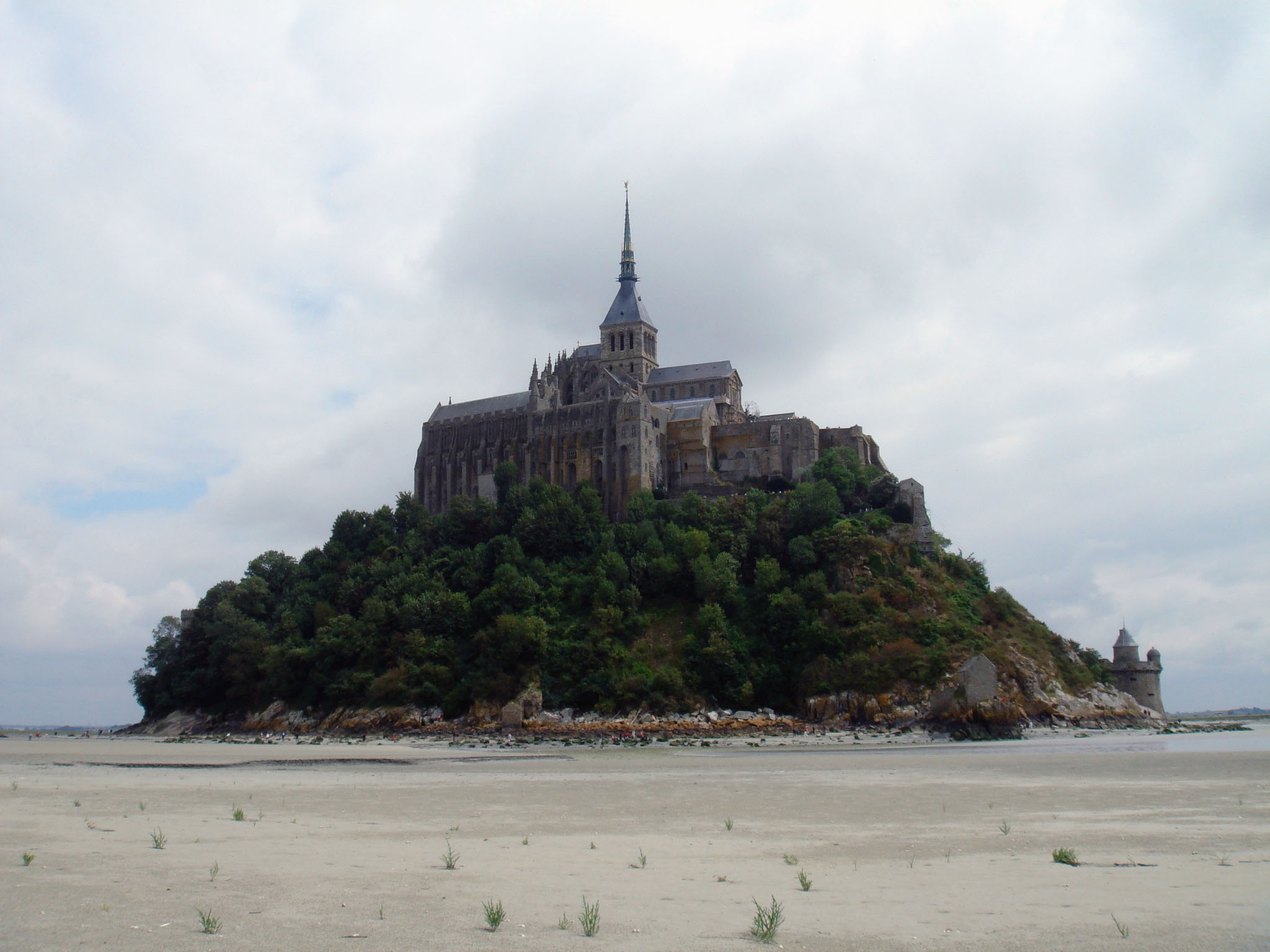
Mont Saint-Michel, endowed by Conan I, and his final resting place

=== The Mont St Michel land charter ===
In a charter dated 28 July 990, Conan gave the lands of Villamée, Lillele and Passille to Mont Saint-Michel, all of which later became part of the seigneury of Fougères.

=== Marriage alliance ===
Conan married Ermengarde-Gerberga of Anjou, (Note: Raoul Glaber in his Histories [Bk. II, Ch. 3, para. 4] was openly hostile to Conan and stated that after he married Ermengarde-Gerberga, Fulk Nerra's sister, he was "the most insolent of principes (Latin: leader, first among his people).") in 973, daughter of Geoffrey I, Count of Anjou and Adele of Vermandois. Conan's alliance with Odo of Blois had helped him defeat Judicael Berengar.

=== Norman Pact ===
The alliance with Blois eventually became troublesome and he later needed to "rid himself of influence from Blois, [which he accomplished by signing] a pact with Richard I of Normandy; [this pact] established firm Breton-Norman links for the first time." Richard I had married the daughter of Hugh I the Great, and after this marriage had re-asserted his father's claim as Overlord of the Breton duchy. Conan I's pact with Normandy strengthened that assertion but the historical documentation for that Overlordship claim remains doubtful because it largely appears only in the less than authoritative writings of Dudo of Saint-Quentin. (Note: Price also refers us to de la Borderie 1898, for a discussion of the relationship between Conan I and Richard I.)

=== Death ===
Conan died fighting his brother-in-law Fulk Nerra, Count of Anjou at the Battle of Conquereuil on 27 June 992. Conan is buried at Mont Saint-Michel Abbey.

== Family ==
Conan and his wife Ermengarde-Gerberga had:

- Geoffrey (c. 980–1008), the eventual heir.
- Judith (982–1017), married Richard II, Duke of Normandy.
- Judicael, count of Porhoët (died 1037).
- Hernod.
- Catuallon, Abbot of Redon

== See also ==
- Counts of Rennes
- Dukes of Brittany
- Dukes of Brittany family tree

== Bibliography ==
- Alexander, Jonathan James Graham (1970). Norman illumination at Mont St Michel, 966–1100. Oxford, UK: Clarendon Press.
- Bachrach, Bernard S. (1993). Fulk Nerra, the neo-Roman consul, 987-1040: A Political Biography of the Angevin Count. Berkeley and Los Angeles: University of California Press.
- Bachrach, Bernard S. (2002). Warfare and Military Organization in Pre-Crusade Europe. Ashgate Publishing.
- Delumeau, Jean (1969). Histoire de la Bretagne. Toulouse, France: Edouard Privat editeur; Jean Delumeau, directeur, with contributing authors P-R Giot, J L'Helgouach, J Briard, J-B Colbert de Beaulieu, L Pape, P Rache, G Devailly, H Touchard, J Meyer, A Mussat, and G Le Guen (chapters do not specify individual authors).
- Keats-Rohan, K.S.B. (1994). 'Two Studies in North French Prosopography', Journal of Medieval History Vol. 20.
- Glaber, Rodulfus (1989). France, John (ed.). The Five Books of the Histories. The Clarendon Press.
- Price, Neil S. (1989). "The Vikings in Brittany" (PDF). Saga-Book of the Viking Society. XXII (6): 319–440.

Conan I of Rennes House of Rennes Born: 927 Died: 27 June 992
Preceded by Judicael Berengar	Count of Rennes; 958–992	Succeeded by Geoffrey I
Vacant Title last held by Alan	Duke of Brittany; 990–992	Succeeded by Geoffrey I
