= 1017 =

Calendar year

1017 in various calendars
- Gregorian calendar: 1017; MXVII
- Ab urbe condita: 1770
- Armenian calendar: 466; ԹՎ ՆԿԶ
- Assyrian calendar: 5767
- Balinese saka calendar: 938–939
- Bengali calendar: 423–424
- Berber calendar: 1967
- English Regnal year: N/A
- Buddhist calendar: 1561
- Burmese calendar: 379
- Byzantine calendar: 6525–6526
- Chinese calendar: 丙辰年 (Fire Dragon); 3714 or 3507 — to — 丁巳年 (Fire Snake); 3715 or 3508
- Coptic calendar: 733–734
- Discordian calendar: 2183
- Ethiopian calendar: 1009–1010
- Hebrew calendar: 4777–4778
- Hindu calendars
- Vikram Samvat: 1073–1074
- Shaka Samvat: 938–939
- Kali Yuga: 4117–4118
- Holocene calendar: 11017
- Igbo calendar: 17–18
- Iranian calendar: 395–396
- Islamic calendar: 407–408
- Japanese calendar: Chōwa 6 / Kannin 1 (寛仁元年)
- Javanese calendar: 919–920
- Julian calendar: 1017; MXVII
- Korean calendar: 3350
- Minguo calendar: 895 before ROC 民前895年
- Nanakshahi calendar: −451
- Seleucid era: 1328/1329 AG
- Thai solar calendar: 1559–1560
- Tibetan calendar: མེ་ཕོ་འབྲུག་ལོ་ (male Fire-Dragon); 1143 or 762 or −10 — to — མེ་མོ་སྦྲུལ་ལོ་ (female Fire-Snake); 1144 or 763 or −9

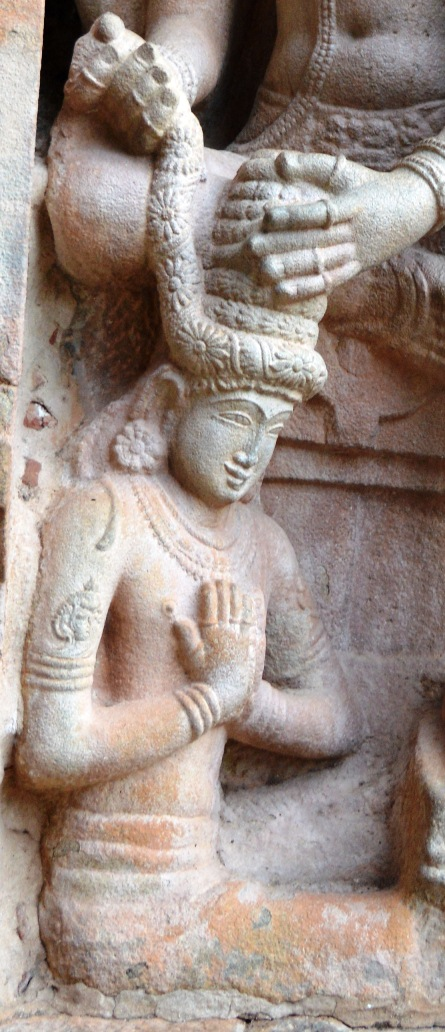
Sculpture of Rajendra I (r. 1014–1044)

Year 1017 (MXVII) was a common year starting on Tuesday of the Julian calendar.

== Events ==
=== Europe ===
- Summer – Melus of Bari, a Lombard nobleman, revolts and is supported by Norman mercenaries at Capua. He marches into Apulia to catch the Byzantine army off-guard. Melus defeats the Byzantines on the banks of the Fortore River and ravages the territory in Apulia.
- Winter – Emperor Basil II ("the Bulgar Slayer") replaces Leo Tornikios with the new catapan Basil Boioannes and sends him reinforcements (including a detachment of the elite Varangian Guard) from Constantinople.

=== England ===
- January 6 – Cnut ("the Great") is crowned king of England. In July he marries Emma of Normandy, the widow of Æthelred the Unready, securing his ties with Normandy.
- Cnut divides England into four earldoms: Wessex, Mercia, East Anglia and Northumbria.

=== Arabian Empire ===
- Summer – Hamza ibn-'Ali ibn-Ahmad publicly declares the founding of the Druze religion, during the reign of the Fatimid Caliph Al-Hakim bi-Amr Allah.

=== Africa ===
- The Sunnis of Kairouan (modern Tunisia) revolt against the Shi'ite Zirid dynasty. The city is quickly retaken and sacked.

=== Asia ===
- March – Fujiwara no Michinaga passes the title of regent of Japan (Sesshō) to his eldest son Fujiwara no Yorimichi.
- September
  - Prince Atsuakira of Japan, eldest son of ex-Emperor Sanjō, having been struck by a skin disease and under intense pressure from Michinaga, resigns the title of Crown Prince in favour of his younger brother, Prince Atsunaga who marries Fujiwara no Kanshi, daughter of Michinaga.
  - Michinaga makes a pilgrimage to the Iwashimizu Shrine in Japan accompanied by many courtiers. The travelers divide themselves amongst 15 boats for a floating trip down the Yotogawa River. One of the vessels overturns and more than 30 people lose their lives.
- December 24 – Michinaga is granted the honorary title Daijō-daijin of Japan.
- Rajendra I, ruler of the Chola dynasty (in modern India), conquers Sri Lanka and annexes the island.

=== By topic ===
==== Religion ====
- Construction of Saint Sophia Cathedral, Kyiv is started (approximate date).

== Births ==
- October 28 – Henry III, Holy Roman Emperor (d. 1056)
- Ahimaaz ben Paltiel, Italian-Jewish liturgical poet (d. 1060)
- Bermudo III (or Vermudo), king of León (approximate date)
- Floris I, count of Friesland west of the Vlie (approximate date)
- Ramanuja, Indian Sri Vaishnavism philosopher (d. 1137)
- Vikramabahu (Kassapa VI), king of Sri Lanka (d. 1041)
- Zhou Dunyi, Chinese philosopher and cosmologist (d. 1073)

== Deaths ==
- February 5 – Sancho García, count of Castile
- June 5 – Sanjō, ex-emperor of Japan (b. 976)
- June 22 – Leo Passianos, Byzantine general
- July 6 – Genshin, Japanese Tendai scholar (b. 942)
- September 18 – Henry of Schweinfurt, German nobleman
- October 6 – Wang Dan, Chinese Grand Chancellor
- Eadric Streona, ealdorman of Mercia
- Eadwig Ætheling, son of Æthelred II
- Elvira of Castile, queen consort of León
- Emnilda, duchess consort of Poland
- Fujiwara no Junshi, Japanese empress (b. 957)
- Judith of Brittany, duchess of Normandy (b. 982)
- Ma'mun II, Ma'munid ruler of Khwarezm
- Ramon Borrell, count of Barcelona (b. 972)
- Renaud of Vendôme, French nobleman

== Sources ==
- Agnihotri, V. K. (2010). "South India". Indian History with Objective Questions and Historical Maps (26 ed.). Allied Publishers. p. 59. ISBN 978-8184243406.
- Meynier, Gilbert (2010). L'Algérie cœur du Maghreb classique. De l'ouverture islamo-arabe au repli (658-1518) (in French). Paris: La Découverte. ISBN 978-2707152312.
