= Parcours botanique au fil de l'Indre =

Arboretum and botanical garden in Centre-Val de Loire, France

Coordinates: 47°17′18″N 0°42′52″E

The Parcours botanique au fil de l'Indre is an arboretum and botanical garden located in Montbazon, Indre-et-Loire, Centre-Val de Loire, France. It is open daily without charge.

The botanical area consists of the Grande Rouge, a château's forest park, and the Grande Ilette, a riverside area. The park is primarily oak but also contains notable trees, including cypress, a Sequoiadendron planted circa 1890–1900, and a Taxodium distichum, as well as hornbeam, beech, maple, chestnut, American locust, and Scotch fir. The Grande Ilette lies along the banks of the river Indre, and contains a meadow as well as exotic plantings of Alnus cordata, bald cypress, black walnut, and Sequoia sempervirens.

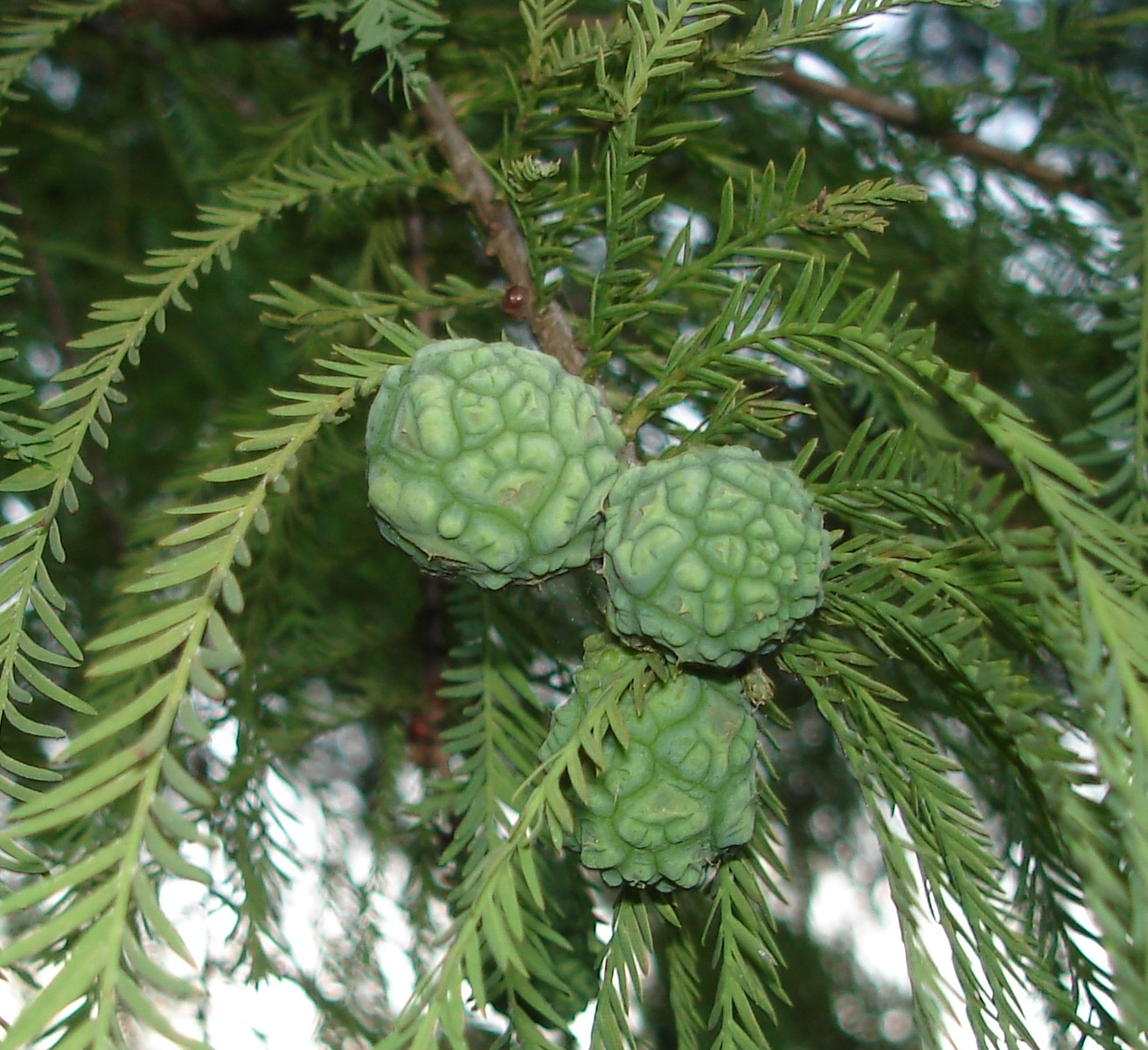
Parcours botanique au fil de l'Indre

== See also ==
- List of botanical gardens in France
