= Montbazon =

- Commune
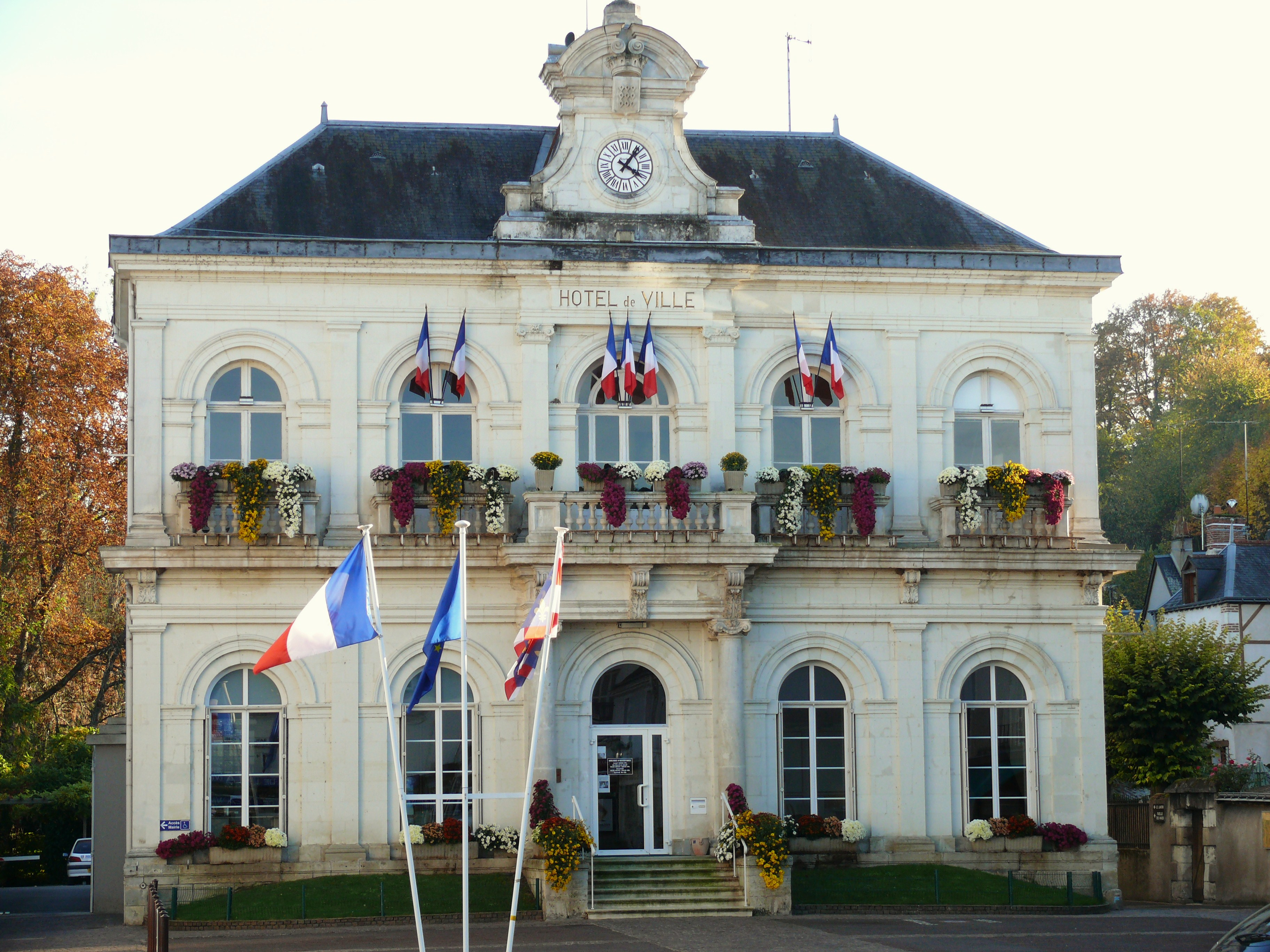
- Town hall

- Coat of arms
- Location of Montbazon
- Location within France Location within Centre-Val de Loire
- Coordinates: 47°17′18″N 0°42′52″E
- Country: France
- Region: Centre-Val de Loire
- Department: Indre-et-Loire
- Arrondissement: Tours
- Canton: Monts

Government
  - Mayor (2020–2026): Sylvie Giner
- Area^{1}: 6.50 km^{2} (2.51 sq mi)
- Highest elevation: 92 m (302 ft)
- Lowest elevation: 52 m (171 ft)
- Population (2023): 4,874
  - Density: 750/km^{2} (1,940/sq mi)
- Time zone: UTC+01:00 (CET)
  - Summer (DST): UTC+02:00 (CEST)
- INSEE/Postal code: 37154 /37250
- ^{1} French Land Register data, which excludes lakes, ponds, glaciers > 1 km^{2} (0.386 sq mi or 247 acres) and river estuaries.

Montbazon (French pronunciation: [mɔ̃bazɔ̃]) is a commune in the Indre-et-Loire department, France. It is located on the river Indre between the towns of Veigné, Monts and Sorigny. The town is about 12 km from Tours.

== History ==
In 991, friars of Cormery complained to the king that Fulk Nerra, lord of Anjou, was building a fortress in their land of Montbazon (he became lord of Montbazon in 997 although he was 17 years old).

From 994, the lofty fortress dominated a strategic point on the Indre river.

== Population ==
Historical population

Year	Pop.	±% p.a.
1793	800	—
1800	947	+2.44%
1806	888	−1.07%
1821	1,020	+0.93%
1831	1,080	+0.57%
1836	1,180	+1.79%
1841	1,181	+0.02%
1846	1,116	−1.13%
1851	1,145	+0.51%
1856	1,096	−0.87%
1861	1,074	−0.40%
1866	1,090	+0.30%
1872	1,032	−0.91%
1876	1,179	+3.39%
1881	1,181	+0.03%
1886	1,197	+0.27%
1891	1,143	−0.92%
1896	1,143	+0.00%
1901	1,127	−0.28%

Year	Pop.	±% p.a.
1906	1,150	+0.40%
1911	1,161	+0.19%
1921	1,150	−0.10%
1926	1,089	−1.08%
1931	1,086	−0.06%
1936	1,096	+0.18%
1946	1,697	+4.47%
1954	1,267	−3.59%
1962	1,622	+3.14%
1968	1,903	+2.70%
1975	2,447	+3.66%
1982	3,011	+3.01%
1990	3,354	+1.36%
1999	3,434	+0.26%
2007	3,936	+1.72%
2012	4,022	+0.43%
2017	4,313	+1.41%
2023	4,874	+2.06%

Source: EHESS and INSEE (1968–2023)

== Economy ==
Montbazon has a small industrial park. It groups together small and medium-sized businesses.

== Education ==
There are four schools in the town:

- Jean Le Bourg kindergarten
- Guillaume Louis Primary School
- Albert Camus High School
- Saint Gatien Private High School

== Transportation ==
There are two bus lines (G and H) which cross the town. Four bus stops are located at:

- City Center
- Albert Camus High School
- La Courtille
- La Grange Barbier

There is also a TER rail line from Montbazon gare to Tours and intermediate stations.

== Media ==
The town launched an online radio station in 2010.

== Sights ==
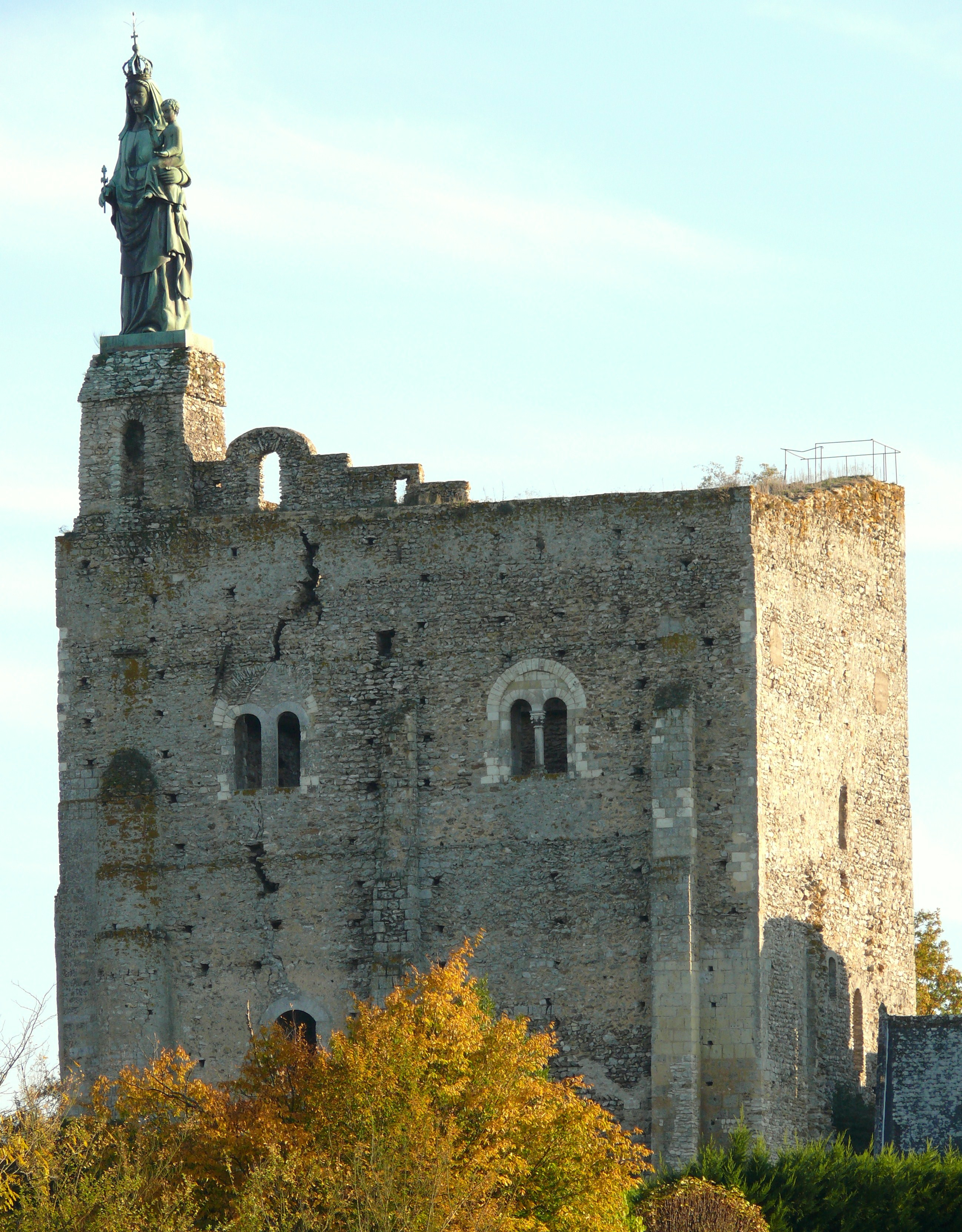
Fulk Nerra fortress

- Castle Site of Montbazon
- The fortress of Montbazon built by Fulk Nerra is one of the oldest fortress in France.
- Le Château d'Artigny
- Parcours botanique au fil de l'Indre

== See also ==
- Communes of the Indre-et-Loire department
- Duchy of Montbazon
