= 981 =

Calendar year

981 in various calendars
- Gregorian calendar: 981; CMLXXXI
- Ab urbe condita: 1734
- Armenian calendar: 430; ԹՎ ՆԼ
- Assyrian calendar: 5731
- Balinese saka calendar: 902–903
- Bengali calendar: 387–388
- Berber calendar: 1931
- Buddhist calendar: 1525
- Burmese calendar: 343
- Byzantine calendar: 6489–6490
- Chinese calendar: 庚辰年 (Metal Dragon); 3678 or 3471 — to — 辛巳年 (Metal Snake); 3679 or 3472
- Coptic calendar: 697–698
- Discordian calendar: 2147
- Ethiopian calendar: 973–974
- Hebrew calendar: 4741–4742
- Hindu calendars
- Vikram Samvat: 1037–1038
- Shaka Samvat: 902–903
- Kali Yuga: 4081–4082
- Holocene calendar: 10981
- Iranian calendar: 359–360
- Islamic calendar: 370–371
- Japanese calendar: Tengen 4 (天元４年)
- Javanese calendar: 882–883
- Julian calendar: 981; CMLXXXI
- Korean calendar: 3314
- Minguo calendar: 931 before ROC 民前931年
- Nanakshahi calendar: −487
- Seleucid era: 1292/1293 AG
- Thai solar calendar: 1523–1524
- Tibetan calendar: ལྕགས་ཕོ་འབྲུག་ལོ་ (male Iron-Dragon); 1107 or 726 or −46 — to — ལྕགས་མོ་སྦྲུལ་ལོ་ (female Iron-Snake); 1108 or 727 or −45

Al-Mansur's campaigns in Al-Andalus.

Year 981 (CMLXXXI) was a common year starting on Saturday of the Julian calendar.

== Events ==
=== By place ===
==== Europe ====
- Spring – Emperor Otto II (the Red) leads the imperial court to Rome, making the city his imperial capital, and receives nobles from all parts of Western Europe. Otto makes plans to conquer Byzantine Italy.
- Fall – Otto II departs with an expeditionary force from Rome, and invades Apulia (Southern Italy) to punish the Saracens. He demands a fleet from Pisa, and imposes a trade embargo against Venice.
- Al-Mansur, the de facto ruler of Al-Andalus, conquers and razes the city of Zamora, as part of his effort to seize the Christian-dominated north of the Iberian Peninsula.

==== Asia ====
- Summer – Seongjong ascends the throne of Goryeo (Korea) after the death of his brother-in-law (and cousin), king Gyeongjong.
- The first recorded Mahamastakabhisheka ceremony, of the sacred 57 foot (17 m) high monolithic statue of Bahubali, is performed.
- The Gommateshwara statue is built by Chavundaraya, minister and commander of the Ganga dynasty, in India (approximate date).
- Song–Đại Cồ Việt war: Đại Cồ Việt under King Lê Đại Hành defeated the invasion of the Song.

=== By topic ===
==== Exploration ====
- Erik the Red leaves Norway, to survey west of Iceland in Viking longships, that carry nearly 700 people with cattle, horses, and other necessities for starting a colony on the island. Erik finds land and calls it Greenland.

==== Religion ====
- Spring – Pope Benedict VII dissolves the Slavic bishopric of Merseburg, after conferring with Otto II. He issues an encyclical, forbidding the exaction of money for the conferral of any Holy Order (known as simony).

==== Commerce ====
- The first commercially made shaving soap sells for 3 dirhams (0.3 dinars).

== Births ==
- Abu'l-Qasim al-Husayn ibn Ali al-Maghribi, Arab statesman (d. 1027)
- Giovanni Orseolo, Venetian nobleman (d. 1006)
- Li Deming, Chinese general and rebel leader (d. 1032)
- Theodora, Empress of the Byzantine Empire (d. 1056)
- Torstein Knarresmed, Norse Viking warrior (approximate date)
- Vladivoj, duke of Bohemia (approximate date)

== Deaths ==
- February 12 – Ælfstan, bishop of Ramsbury
- June 20 – Adalbert, archbishop of Magdeburg
- July 9 – Ramiro Garcés, king of Viguera (Spain)
- July 12 – Xue Juzheng, Chinese scholar-official and historian
- August 13 – Gyeongjong, king of Goryeo (Korea) (b. 955)
- Abu'l-Faraj Muhammad, Buyid nobleman and statesman
- Amlaíb Cuarán, Viking king of Scandinavian York
- Ibn Khalawayh, Persian scholar and grammar (or 980)
- Pandulf Ironhead, prince of Benevento and Capua
- Slavník, founder of the Slavník dynasty (Bohemia)
- Wigger I, German nobleman (approximate date)
- Zhao Defang, prince of the Song dynasty (b. 959)
