= Geoffrey of Angoulême =

Count of Angoulême from 1032 to 1048

Geoffrey (died 1048) was the Count of Angoulême from 1032. His brother Alduin II succeeded their father, William II, as Count in 1028, but the brothers quarrelled over their inheritance in the Bordelais. In a settlement that year, Alduin granted three quarters of the newer castle (the old one still stood) at Blavia (Blaye) to Geoffrey in beneficio, keeping the remaining quarter for himself as an allod. Their quarrel had given opportunity to the Saintonge to rebel, and the counts lost control of it, being reduced to "minor nobles dependent upon the dukes of Aquitaine".

In 1047, Count Geoffrey I of Anjou imported moneyers from Angoulême to staff his new mint at Saintes, which his father had taken over during the previous rebellion.

He had a son by Petronilla of Archiac, who succeeded him in title and territory:

- Fulk of Angoulême
