= Fulk III of Anjou =

11th-century Frankish nobleman

Fulk III
- Count of Anjou
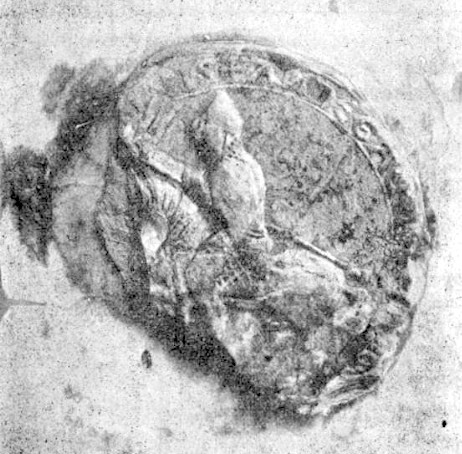
- Seal of Fulk III
- Born: Fulk Nerra c. 970
- Died: 21 June 1040 (aged 69–70); Metz
- Noble family: House of Ingelger
- Spouses: Elisabeth of Vendôme; Hildegarde
- Issue: Adele of Vendôme; Geoffrey II, Count of Anjou; Ermengarde of Anjou, Duchess of Burgundy
- Father: Geoffrey I of Anjou
- Mother: Adele of Meaux

Fulk III (c. 970 – 21 June 1040), known as Fulk the Black or Fulk Nerra (Old French: Foulque Nerra), was an early count of Anjou, celebrated as one of the first great builders of medieval castles. It is estimated Fulk constructed approximately 100 castles as well as abbeys throughout the Loire Valley. He fought successive wars with neighbors in Brittany, Blois, Poitou and Aquitaine and made four pilgrimages to Jerusalem during the course of his life. He had two wives and three children.

Fulk was a natural horseman and fearsome warrior with a keen sense of military strategy that bested most of his opponents. He was allied with the goals and aims of the Capetians against the dissipated Carolingians of his era. With his county seat at Angers, Fulk's bitter enemy was Odo II of Blois, his neighbor 128 km east along the Loire river, at Tours. The two men traded towns, followers and insults throughout their lives.

Fulk finished his first castle at Langeais, 104 km east of Angers, on the banks of the Loire. Like many of his constructions, it began as a wooden tower, and was eventually replaced with a stone structure, fortified with exterior walls, and equipped with a thick-walled tower called a donjon in French (source of the English word "dungeon", which, however, implies a cellar rather than a tower). He built it in the territory of Odo I, Count of Blois, and they fought a battle over it in 994. But Odo I died of a sudden illness, and his son and successor, Odo II, did not manage to evict Fulk.

Fulk continued building more towers in a slow encirclement of Tours: Montbazon, Montrésor, Mirebeau, Montrichard, Loches, and even the tower of Montboyau, erected just across the Loire from Tours in 1016. He also fortified the castles at Angers, Amboise, Chateau-Gontier, Chinon, Mayenne and Semblançay, among many others. "The construction of castles for the purpose of extending a ruler's power was part of Fulk Nerra's strategy," wrote Peter Fraser Purton, in A History of Medieval Siege, c. 450–1220.

Although some sources refer to Fulk as "a devout Christian" (who built, enlarged or endowed several abbeys and monasteries, such as the Abbey of Beaulieu-lès-Loches, Saint-Florent-le-Vieil, Saint-Aubin, and a convent, Notre Dame de la Charité, at Ronceray in Angers), others explain this fever to build Christian buildings, as his desperate attempt to ensure his salvation, after a life of ruthless violence against both his political enemies, and his own family members. Although he never learned to write, he endowed a school with revenue to provide poor students with an education. Fulk also undertook four pilgrimages to Jerusalem.

== Family ==
Fulk was the son of Geoffrey I of Anjou, also known as Geoffrey Grisegonelle, and Adele of Meaux, daughter of Robert of Vermandois, Count of Meaux and Troyes, and Adelaide of Burgundy. He had an older sister, Ermengarde-Gerberga of Anjou, who married Conan of Brittany, and a younger brother, Geoffrey. A half-brother, Maurice, was born in 980.

Fulk married Elisabeth (c. 979–999), daughter of Count Bouchard I of Vendôme, and they had one daughter, Adèle, who married Bodon, son of Landry, Count of Nevers. Their eldest son, Bouchard, inherited Vendôme. There are varied stories regarding Elisabeth's death. One story was recounted in the Chronicles of Saint-Florent: Elisabeth occupied the citadel at Angers with some supporters and while under siege from Fulk, she fell from a great height, and then was burnt at the stake for adultery. Another story is that Nerra trumped up these charges of adultery, seeking to be rid of Elisabeth, because she had not given him a son. By age 20, she had only given birth to a daughter, and appeared to be sterile, as no other pregnancies occurred in the continuing years of their marriage. According to the account given in La Chronique de Saint Aubin d'Angers, he "had her tried at an ecclesiastical court in Angers, by judges he knew would convict her; then he had her dressed in her gaiest clothes and personally led her out to be burned at the stake in the square in front of the cathedral."

Fulk subsequently married Hildegarde, daughter of Duke Theodoric I of Upper Lorraine, around December 1005. They had two children:

- Geoffrey II, in 1006, who became known as Geoffrey Martel and succeeded Fulk as Count of Anjou in 1040.
- Ermengarde, born sometime in 1017.

== Combat ==
Fulk Nerra's first victory was in June 992 at the Battle of Conquereuil, where he managed to defeat Conan I, Duke of Brittany. Conan's territorial ambitions had been quashed by Geoffroy Grisgonelle in 980, and seven years later, he planned an ambush on Angers while Fulk was attending the crowning of Robert the Pious. Fulk and his men foiled the ambush, killing Conan's son, Alain, in the process. In 992 Fulk laid siege to Conan's castle at Nantes, but he slipped away to Conquereuil. Conan was killed in the subsequent battle, and Fulk installed a governor/regent, as the succeeding count was a child.

Fulk and Odo II of Blois fought many skirmishes over territory and alliances, their biggest battle occurred in July 1016 at the Battle of Pontlevoy. Odo marched 10,000 men southward toward Fulk's tower at Montboyau; meanwhile, Fulk and his much smaller group attacked him from behind. Fulk's men were routed, retreated, and Odo, thinking the battle won, went for a swim in the Cher River. Reinforcements led by Count Herbert Wake-Dog of Maine arrived to help Fulk, routing Odo's surprised men, giving Fulk the victory. Several thousand were reported killed.

== Pilgrimages ==
Fulk also undertook four pilgrimages to Jerusalem—the first and second as a penitent seeking forgiveness for sins, and the third and fourth to protect pilgrims. In 1003, Fulk traveled to Jerusalem for his first pilgrimage. The voyage crossed the Alps at the Grand Bernard Pass in present-day Switzerland, then overland to Bari in the southern Italian peninsula (a stop in Rome was usually made) and by ship to the Holy Land. The journey took as long as six months, through deeply dangerous territory.

Fulk made a second pilgrimage in 1008, obliged to do so by the king as punishment after Fulk ordered the murder of an enemy. For his third and fourth trips, Fulk had a moral obligation to protect pilgrims in the years following the desecration of Jerusalem by the "Mad Caliph" Al-Hakim bi-Amr Allah, and provided armed security against robbers, murderers and enslavers along the route. In 1035, he embarked upon a third pilgrimage with Robert I, Duke of Normandy, and in 1038, he made his final pilgrimage. He died in Metz in 1040 on his return from that trip, and was buried in the chapel of his monastery at Beaulieu.

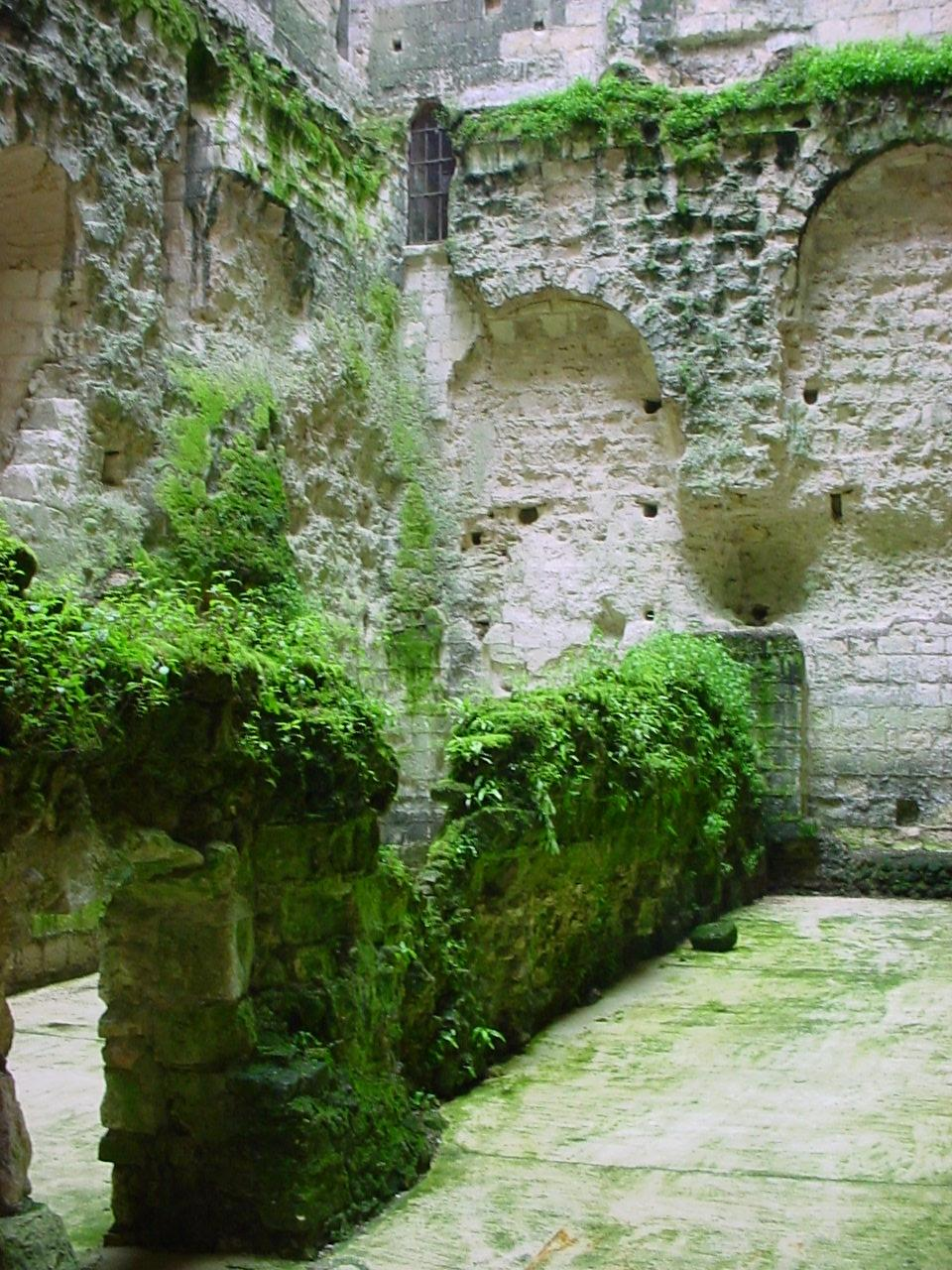
Fulk Nerra's castle keep at Loches

== Succession ==
His son Geoffrey II (Geoffrey Martel) succeeded him as Count of Anjou in 1040 and held the title until 1060. Since he had no living male children from either of his two marriages, the title to Anjou passed to his nephews, the two sons of his sister Ermengarde-Blanche (m. Geoffroy V of Château-Landon), upon his death. Geoffroy III Le Barbu (the Bearded) was Count of Anjou from 1060 to 1068; Fulk IV Réchin (the Mouth) was count from 1068 to 1109. Fulk IV's grandson, Geoffrey Plantagenet, married Matilda, daughter of Henry I of England, and thus heir to the English throne, and began the Plantagenet line of English kings (which included Henry II, Richard the Lionheart [Richard I], and John Lackland, the only King John in English history).

== Sources ==
- Bachrach, Bernard S. (1993). Fulk Nerra, the Neo-Roman Consul, 987–1040. University of California Press.
- Bradbury, Jim (2004). The Routledge Companion to Medieval Warfare. Taylor & Francis. ISBN 9781134598465.
- Bradbury, Jim (2007). The Capetians: Kings of France 987-1328. Bloomsbury Publishing. ISBN 9780826424914.
- Kennedy, Hugh (1995). Crusader Castles. Cambridge University Press.
- Smith, Katherine Allen (2013). War and the Making of Medieval Monastic Culture. Vol. 37. The Boydell Press. ISBN 9781843838678.

Preceded by Geoffrey Grisegonelle	Count of Anjou; 987–1040	Succeeded by Geoffrey Martel
