= Adele of Meaux =

French noblewoman

Adela of Vermandois
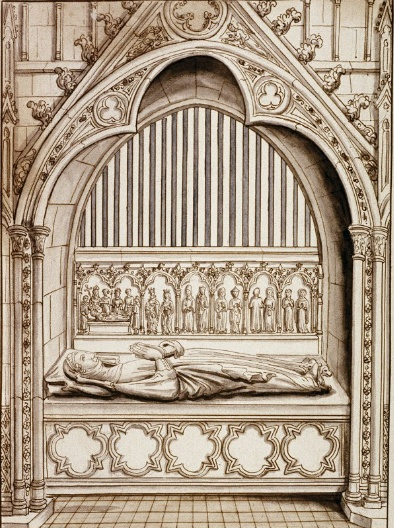
- Effigy of Adele of Meaux on her tomb
- Born: c. 935
- Died: c. 982
- Buried: St Aubin Abbey, Angers
- Noble family: Carolingian
- Spouse: Geoffrey I of Anjou
- Issue: Fulk III of Anjou; Geoffrey; Ermengarde-Gerberga of Anjou
- Father: Robert of Vermandois
- Mother: Adelaide Werra

Adela of Vermandois (c. 935 – c. 982) was a French noblewoman. She was Countess of Chalon and later Countess of Anjou.

Adela was a daughter of Robert of Vermandois, Count of Meaux and Troyes, and Adelaide of Burgundy. (Note: According to Bachrach, Adele's father was Herbert II, Count of Vermandois.) Adele died in 982.

== Family ==
She married Geoffrey I of Anjou (c. 938/940 – July 21, 987). Their children were:

- Fulk III of Anjou (970-1040), he succeeded his father as Count of Anjou.
- Geoffrey of Anjou (971-977), died young.
- Ermengarde-Gerberga of Anjou, married Conan I of Rennes. She married secondly William II of Angoulême.

== Sources ==
- Bachrach, Bernard S. (1993). Fulk Nerra the Neo-Roman Consul, 987-1040. University of California Press.
- Bouchard, Constance Brittain (2001). Those of My Blood: Creating Noble Families in Medieval Francia. University of Pennsylvania Press.
