= Geoffrey I of Anjou =

French nobleman (c. 939–987)

Geoffrey Grey Gown
- Count of Anjou
- Born: c. 938/940
- Died: 21 July 987; Marçon, France
- Noble family: Ingelger
- Spouses: Adele of Meaux; Adelaise de Châlons
- Issue: Fulk III of Anjou; Geoffrey; Ermengarde-Gerberga of Anjou
- Father: Fulk II of Anjou
- Mother: Gerberga

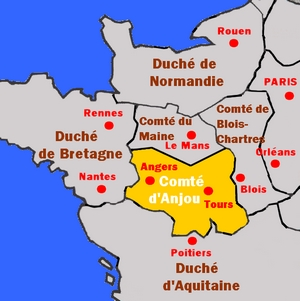
Anjou and surrounding territories

Geoffrey I of Anjou (c. 938/940 – 21 July 987), known as Grisegonelle ("Grey Gown" or "Greymantle"), was count of Anjou from 960 to 987.

== Life ==
Geoffrey was the eldest son of Fulk II, Count of Anjou and his first wife Gerberga. He succeeded his father as Count of Anjou about 960, at the age of 20. He married Adele of Meaux (934–982), daughter of Robert of Vermandois. Her father was a patrilineal descendant of Charlemagne, while her paternal grandmother was daughter of king Robert I of France. Through this marriage the Angevins joined the highest ranks of western French nobility.

Geoffrey started by making his power-base the citadel of Angers strategically placing his fidèles in key areas surrounding the city to protect his territories. The lands of the abbeys of Saint-Aubin and Saint-Serge in Angers provided the beneficium for his most faithful adherents. On this subject which became this family's theme, Geoffrey advised both his sons, Fulk and Maurice: "No house is weak that has many friends. Therefore I admonish you to hold dear those fideles who have been friends." Although one of the principal methods of Angevin expansion was by the creation of family connections Geoffrey exerted his control through various methods. His father had controlled Nantes through his second marriage to the widowed countess and Geoffrey continued this by making Count Guerech accept him as overlord. With an eye towards Maine, Geoffrey took advantage of the rift that developed between the Counts of Maine and the viscounts and Bishops of Le Mans. About 971 Geoffrey secured the see of Le Mans for his ally Bishop Seinfroy. In 973 Geoffrey had married his daughter Ermengarde-Gerberga to Conan I of Rennes but Conan began to oppose Geoffrey and in 982 the two met at the first battle of Conquereuil with Geoffrey defeating Conan.

Geoffrey had influence in Aquitaine by way of his mother Gerberga and then of his sister Adelaide-Blanche's first marriage to the powerful baron Stephen, Count of Gevaudan and Forez, after whose death the lands were ruled by Adelaide. His nephews Pons and Bertrand succeeded as counts there and his niece Adalmode married Adelbert, Count of Marche and Périgord. In 975 Geoffrey had his brother Guy appointed Count and Bishop of Le Puy. In 982 Geoffrey married his now widowed sister Adelaide-Blanche to the fifteen-year-old Louis V of France, the two being crowned King and Queen of Aquitaine. But the marriage to a woman thirty years his senior failed as did Geoffrey's plans to control Aquitaine through his young son-in-law. After the death of his first wife Adele, Geoffrey married secondly Adelaise de Châlon and for nearly a decade exerted control over the county of Châlons. Through the marriage of his son Fulk III to Elisabeth, the heiress of Vendôme, Geoffrey brought that county into the Angevin sphere of influence. At this time Geoffrey made Fulk his co-ruler, and died shortly thereafter while besieging the fortress of Marçon on 21 July 987.

== Family ==
He married Adele of Meaux (934–982), daughter of Robert of Vermandois and Adelais de Vergy. Their children were:

- Ermengarde-Gerberga of Anjou (b. 956), married Conan I of Rennes. She married, secondly, William II of Angoulême.
- Fulk III of Anjou (970-1040), he succeeded his father as Count of Anjou.
- Geoffrey of Anjou (971-977), died young.

He married, secondly, to Adelaide de Chalon and had:

- Maurice of Anjou, destined to become a Count on the Nevers-Loire march, he failed and then assisted his brother in Angers.

== Sources ==
- Bachrach, Bernard S. (1978). "The Idea of the Angevin Empire". Albion: A Quarterly Journal Concerned with British Studies. 10, No. 4 (Winter) (4): 293–299. doi:10.2307/4048161. JSTOR 4048161.
- Bachrach, Bernard S. (1993). Fulk Nerra the Neo-Roman Consul, 987-1040. University of California Press.
- Bouchard, Constance Brittain (2001). Those of My Blood: Creating Noble Families in Medieval Francia. University of Pennsylvania Press.
- Cohen, E.; de Jong, M.B., eds. (2001). Medieval Transformations: Texts, Power, and Gifts in Context. Brill.
- Bijard, Raphaël (30 November 2022). "La construction de la Bourgogne Robertienne (936–1031)". Academia (in French).
- Fanning, Steven (1978). "A Bishop and His World Before the Gregorian Reform: Hubert of Angers, 1006-1047". Transactions of the American Philosophical Society. 78, Part 1.

== See also ==
- Mabille, Emile. Introduction aux chroniques des comtes d'Anjou (Paris) 1871.

Geoffrey I of Anjou House of Ingelger Born: c. 938/940 Died: 21 July 987
Preceded by Fulk II	Count of Anjou; 960–987	Succeeded by Fulk III
