= Alduin II of Angoulême =

11th century French Count

Alduin II was Count of Angoulême from 1018 to his death in 1031. He was the eldest son of Count William II of Angoulême and Gerberga of Anjou.

After his father's death in 1028, Alduin had several women publicly burned at the stake, accusing them of using witchcraft to poison his father. However, a twelfth century chronicler believed that Alduin's wife Alaisia poisoned Count William. His accession as Count of Angoulême was immediately contested by his younger brother Geoffrey, quarreling over the inheritance of Blaye castle. After besieging the castle for eight days, Alduin was able to conquer the castle and took Geoffrey prisoner. He forgave him for the revolt and gave him land in the Saintonge as a fief.

Alduin died four years after his father. He was married to Alaisia, the heiress of Viscount Grimoard of Fronsac and his wife Dea of Montignac. He was succeeded by his brother Geoffrey, who ousted Alduin's children from the throne of Angoulême.
