= 1032 =

Calendar year

1032 in various calendars
Gregorian calendar	1032; MXXXII
Ab urbe condita	1785
Armenian calendar	481; ԹՎ ՆՁԱ
Assyrian calendar	5782
Balinese saka calendar	953–954
Bengali calendar	438–439
Berber calendar	1982
English Regnal year	N/A
Buddhist calendar	1576
Burmese calendar	394
Byzantine calendar	6540–6541
Chinese calendar	辛未年 (Metal Goat); 3729 or 3522 — to — 壬申年 (Water Monkey); 3730 or 3523
Coptic calendar	748–749
Discordian calendar	2198
Ethiopian calendar	1024–1025
Hebrew calendar	4792–4793
- Hindu calendars
Vikram Samvat	1088–1089
Shaka Samvat	953–954
Kali Yuga	4132–4133
Holocene calendar	11032
Igbo calendar	32–33
Iranian calendar	410–411
Islamic calendar	423–424
Japanese calendar	Chōgen 5 (長元５年)
Javanese calendar	934–935
Julian calendar	1032; MXXXII
Korean calendar	3365
Minguo calendar	880 before ROC 民前880年
Nanakshahi calendar	−436
Seleucid era	1343/1344 AG
Thai solar calendar	1574–1575
Tibetan calendar	ལྕགས་མོ་ལུག་ལོ་ (female Iron-Sheep); 1158 or 777 or 5 — to — ཆུ་ཕོ་སྤྲེ་ལོ་ (male Water-Monkey); 1159 or 778 or 6

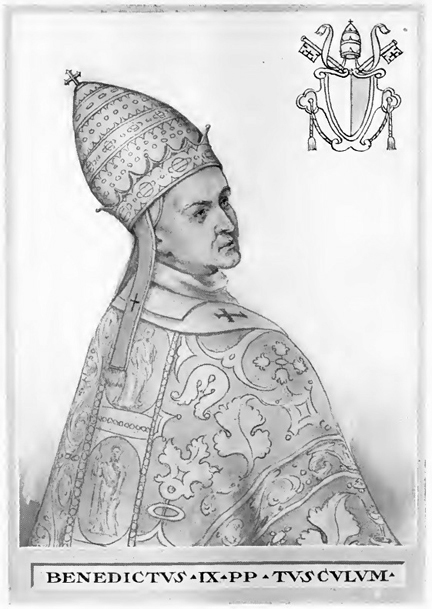
Pope Benedict IX (r. 1032–1044)

Year 1032 (MXXXII) was a leap year starting on Saturday of the Julian calendar.

== Events ==
=== By place ===
==== Byzantine Empire ====
- Spring – Emperor Romanos III (Argyros) sends a Byzantine expeditionary army under General Michael Protospatharios, which includes Western auxiliaries and elite troops of Asia Minor, to reinforce the Byzantine position in Calabria (Southern Italy).

==== Europe ====
- September 6 – King Rudolph III dies without any heirs. He bequeaths his entire dominions to Emperor Conrad II (the Elder), dispatching to him the Holy Lance and ring of St. Maurice, symbols of Burgundian investiture.
- Odo II, count of Champagne, invades Burgundy and seizes most of the kingdom for himself. With the assistance of Humbert I of Savoy, Queen-dowager Ermengarde (Rudolph III's widow) flees to the safety of Zürich.
- Winter – Conrad II marches with his army into Champagne and devastates the land – forcing Odo II to sue for peace and swear to abandon Burgundy. The bishops prevent Conrad from seizing control of Burgundy.
- The first mention is made of Kursk, Russia, in the hagiography of Theodosius, who becomes a monk at the Kiev Caves Monastery (approximate date).

=== By topic ===
==== Religion ====
- October – Pope John XIX dies after an 8-year pontificate at Rome. He is succeeded by his nephew Benedict IX as the 145th pope of the Catholic Church, while (probably) still in his teens.

== Births ==
- February 16 – Ying Zong, Chinese emperor (d. 1067)
- September 3 – Go-Sanjō, Japanese emperor (d. 1073)
- September 14 – Dao Zong, Chinese emperor (d. 1101)
- Abe no Munetō, Japanese nobleman and samurai (d. 1108)
- Cheng Hao, Chinese neo-confucian philosopher (d. 1085)
- Donald III (the Fair), king of Scotland (approximate date)
- Ermengol III (or Armengol), count of Urgell (d. 1065)
- Gao, Chinese empress consort and regent (d. 1093)
- Gyrth Godwinson, English nobleman (approximated date)
- Hugh de Grandmesnil, Norman warrior and sheriff (d. 1098)
- Osbern FitzOsbern, bishop of Exeter (approximate date)
- Touzi Yiqing, Chinese Zen Buddhist monk (d. 1083)
- Vratislaus II (or Wratislaus), king of Bohemia (d. 1092)

== Deaths ==
- July 28 – Constance of Arles, French queen
- July 29 – Matilda of Swabia, German duchess
- September 6 – Rudolph III, king of Burgundy
- October 4 – Sancho VI, duke of Gascony
- Ahmad Maymandi, Ghaznavid vizier
- Arslan Yabgu, Turkic chieftain and ruler
- Bezprym (or Besfrim), duke of Poland
- Constantine Diogenes, Byzantine general
- Gille Coemgáin, king of Moray (Scotland)
- John XIX, pope of the Catholic Church
- Li, Chinese consort and concubine (b. 987)
- Li Deming, Chinese rebel leader (b. 981)
- Odo II, margrave of the Saxon Ostmark
- Otto Orseolo (or Ottone), doge of Venice
