= 954 =

Calendar year

954 in various calendars
- Gregorian calendar: 954; CMLIV
- Ab urbe condita: 1707
- Armenian calendar: 403; ԹՎ ՆԳ
- Assyrian calendar: 5704
- Balinese saka calendar: 875–876
- Bengali calendar: 360–361
- Berber calendar: 1904
- Buddhist calendar: 1498
- Burmese calendar: 316
- Byzantine calendar: 6462–6463
- Chinese calendar: 癸丑年 (Water Ox); 3651 or 3444 — to — 甲寅年 (Wood Tiger); 3652 or 3445
- Coptic calendar: 670–671
- Discordian calendar: 2120
- Ethiopian calendar: 946–947
- Hebrew calendar: 4714–4715
- Hindu calendars
- Vikram Samvat: 1010–1011
- Shaka Samvat: 875–876
- Kali Yuga: 4054–4055
- Holocene calendar: 10954
- Iranian calendar: 332–333
- Islamic calendar: 342–343
- Japanese calendar: Tenryaku 8 (天暦８年)
- Javanese calendar: 854–855
- Julian calendar: 954; CMLIV
- Korean calendar: 3287
- Minguo calendar: 958 before ROC 民前958年
- Nanakshahi calendar: −514
- Seleucid era: 1265/1266 AG
- Thai solar calendar: 1496–1497
- Tibetan calendar: ཆུ་མོ་གླང་ལོ་ (female Water-Ox); 1080 or 699 or −73 — to — ཤིང་ཕོ་སྟག་ལོ་ (male Wood-Tiger); 1081 or 700 or −72

Year 954 (CMLIV) was a common year starting on Sunday of the Julian calendar.

== Events ==
=== By place ===
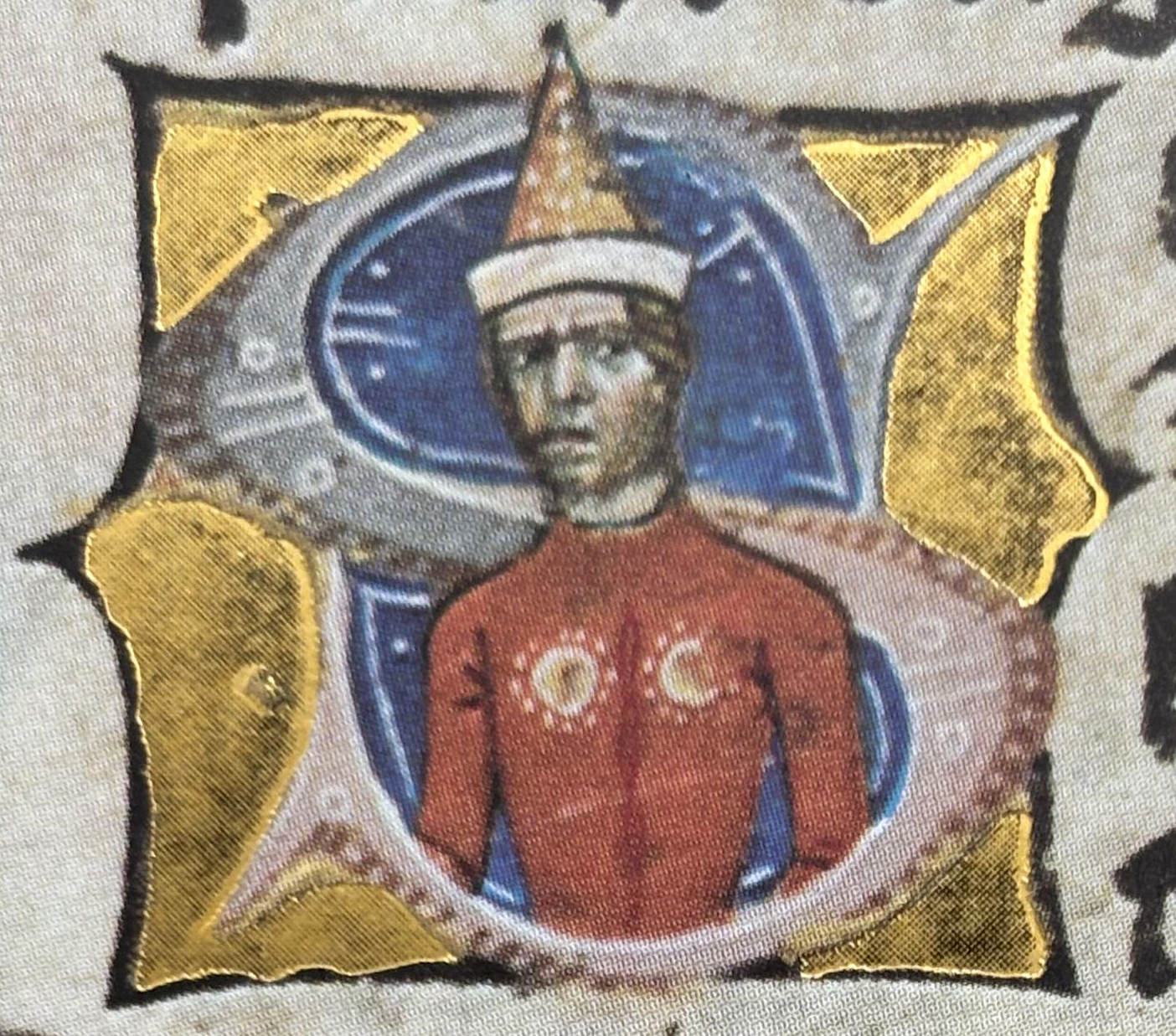
Bulcsú the Sixth Captain among the Seven chieftains of the Hungarians (Chronicon Pictum)

==== Europe ====
- Spring – A Hungarian army led by Bulcsú crosses the Rhine. He camps at Worms in the capital of his ally Conrad the Red, duke of Lorraine. Bulcsú heads west, attacking the domains of King Otto I, by crossing the rivers Moselle and Maas.
- April 6–10 – The Hungarians besiege Cambrai and burn its suburbs, but they are unable to conquer the city. One of Bulcsú's relatives is killed by the defenders, who refuse to pass his body over to the Hungarians. As a revenge, they kill all their captives.
- The Hungarians plunder the regions of Hesbaye and Carbonaria (modern Belgium). They plunder and burn the monastery of Saint Lambert from Hainaut, the monastery of Moorsel, sack the cities of Gembloux and Tournai.
- Summer – The Hungarians plunder the surroundings of Laon, Reims, Chalon, Metz, and Gorze. After that, they return to Burgundy. In Provence, the Hungarians battle with the Moors from the Muslim enclave of Fraxinet.
- September 10 – King Louis IV (d'Outremer) dies after a hunting accident (near his palace in Corbeny). He is succeeded by his 13-year-old son Lothair III under the guardianship of Hugh the Great, count of Paris.
- November 12 – Lothair III is crowned by Artald, archbishop of Reims, at the Abbey of Saint-Remi as king of the West Frankish Kingdom. His mother, Queen Gerberga of Saxony, appoints Hugh the Great as regent.
- Winter – At the Reichstag in Auerstedt assembled by Otto I, his son Liudolf (duke of Swabia) and Conrad the Red submit to Otto's rule. They are stripped of their duchies, but several rebel nobles continue to resist.

==== British Isles ====
- King Eric I (Bloodaxe) is killed at Stainmore allowing King Eadred to recover York, reuniting Northumbria with that of All England. High-Reeve Osulf I of Bamburgh is appointed ealdorman ("earl") of Northumbria.
- King Malcolm I is killed in battle against the Northmen after an 11-year reign. He is succeeded by Indulf, the son of the late King Constantine II, as ruler of Alba (Scotland).

=== By topic ===
==== Religion ====
- Duke Alberic II, princeps and ruler of Rome, dies after a 22-year reign. On his deathbed he nominates his son Octavianus as his successor.
- Seborga (modern-day Liguria) comes under the jurisdiction of the Benedictine monks of Santo Onorato of Lérins.

== Births ==
- Fujiwara no Yoshitaka, Japanese waka poet (d. 974)
- Malcolm II, king of Alba (Scotland) (approximate date)
- Ōnakatomi no Sukechika, Japanese waka poet (d. 1038)
- Otto I, duke of Swabia and Bavaria (d. 982)
- Wang Yucheng, Chinese official and poet (d. 1001)

== Deaths ==
- January 25 – Ashot II, prince of Tao-Klarjeti (Georgia)
- February 22 – Guo Wei, emperor of the Later Zhou (b. 904)
- May 21 – Feng Dao, Chinese prince and chancellor (b. 882)
- September 10 – Louis IV, king of the West Frankish Kingdom
- Abul-Aish Ahmad, Idrisid ruler and sultan (Morocco)
- Alberic II, princeps and duke of Spoleto (b. 912)
- Cellachán Caisil, king of Munster (Ireland)
- Eric I (Bloodaxe), Norwegian Viking king
- Frederick, archbishop (elector) of Mainz
- Fujiwara no Onshi, empress of Japan (b. 885)
- Li, Chinese empress dowager of the Later Han
- Liu Chong, founder of the Northern Han
- Malcolm I, king of Alba (Scotland)
- Nuh ibn Nasr, Samanid emir
