= Historia pontificum et comitum Engolismensium =

The Historia pontificum et comitum Engolismensium ("History of the Bishops and Counts of Angoulême") is an anonymous genealogical history of the Taillefer dynasty of the Counts and Bishops of Angoulême written around 1160. It presents its subject family as a lineage, concentrating on agnatic descent from its founder, William (Guillaume) Taillefer. It records the legend that Taillefer died defending his lands from the Normans with a magic sword. For events before 1030 it depends heavily on Adhemar of Chabannes, but thereafter is an independent source. It provides a precise record of the "succession of counts and bishops, of their genealogy, their fights and their alliances".

The text was first published, from one manuscript, by Father Philippe Labbe in 1657. Further fragments were discovered and edited by Dom Martin Bouquet and his collaborators before, in 1858, Eusèbe Castaigne published and edited the full text based, not on the manuscripts, but on Labbe and Bouquet et al. A fourteenth-century manuscript from the Angoumois was brought back from the Vatican Archives by George de Manteyer, and formed the basis for the first critical edition, published by Jacques Boussard in 1957, as an extension of the doctoral thesis he defended in 1956 for the Faculty of Letters of the University of Paris.

Boussard speculates that the author was a canon of the cathedral of Angoulême, perhaps the one in charge of the archives or the library, and certainly a contemporary of the last persons he mentions.

== Editions ==
- Philippe Labbe, ed. "Historia pontificum et comitum Engolismensium". Nova Bibliotheca manuscriptorum, vol. II, 249–64. Paris, 1657.
- Jacques Boussard, ed. Historia pontificum et comitum Engolismensium. Paris: Librairie d'Argences, 1957.
