= 1073 =

1073 in various calendars
- Gregorian calendar: 1073; MLXXIII
- Ab urbe condita: 1826
- Armenian calendar: 522; ԹՎ ՇԻԲ
- Assyrian calendar: 5823
- Balinese saka calendar: 994–995
- Bengali calendar: 479–480
- Berber calendar: 2023
- English Regnal year: 7 Will. 1 – 8 Will. 1
- Buddhist calendar: 1617
- Burmese calendar: 435
- Byzantine calendar: 6581–6582
- Chinese calendar: 壬子年 (Water Rat); 3770 or 3563 — to — 癸丑年 (Water Ox); 3771 or 3564
- Coptic calendar: 789–790
- Discordian calendar: 2239
- Ethiopian calendar: 1065–1066
- Hebrew calendar: 4833–4834
- Hindu calendars
- Vikram Samvat: 1129–1130
- Shaka Samvat: 994–995
- Kali Yuga: 4173–4174
- Holocene calendar: 11073
- Igbo calendar: 73–74
- Iranian calendar: 451–452
- Islamic calendar: 465–466
- Japanese calendar: Enkyū 5 (延久５年)
- Javanese calendar: 977–978
- Julian calendar: 1073; MLXXIII
- Korean calendar: 3406
- Minguo calendar: 839 before ROC 民前839年
- Nanakshahi calendar: −395
- Seleucid era: 1384/1385 AG
- Thai solar calendar: 1615–1616
- Tibetan calendar: ཆུ་ཕོ་བྱི་བ་ལོ་ (male Water-Rat); 1199 or 818 or 46 — to — ཆུ་མོ་གླང་ལོ་ (female Water-Ox); 1200 or 819 or 47

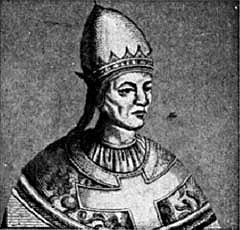
Pope Gregory VII (c. 1015–1085)

Year 1073 (MLXXIII) was a common year starting on Tuesday of the Julian calendar.

== Events ==
=== By place ===
==== Byzantine Empire ====
- Spring – Emperor Michael VII Doukas sends a Byzantine army to deal with Seljuk raiding in Cappadocia, supported with a mixed force of Norman and French mercenary heavy cavalry under Roussel de Bailleul. Roussel re-conquers some territory in Galatia and declares it an independent Norman state. Michael, enraged, sends another army led by his uncle, Caesar John Doukas and the veteran General Nikephoros Botaneiates to deal with the rising of the Norman threat in Asia minor. But the Byzantines are defeated and John is captured. Roussel marches with a force (3,000 men) across Bithynia to the Bosporus and sacks Chrysopolis, near Constantinople.

==== Europe ====
- May 25 – King Sancho IV of Navarre and Ahmad al-Muqtadir, Muslim ruler of the Taifa of Zaragoza, conclude an alliance by treaty.
- October 14 – The Judicate of Arborea (one of the four independent kingdoms in Sardinia) is recognised by Pope Gregory VII.
- Ebles II of Roucy leads a French army in Spain, to support King Sancho V of Aragon in his struggle against his Muslim neighbors.
- Sviatoslav II and Vsevolod I unite the Kievan forces and expel their brother Iziaslav I. Sviatoslav II becomes Grand Prince of Kiev.

==== Britain ====
- Edgar Ætheling, last male member of the House of Wessex, joins forces with Kings Malcolm III of Scotland and Philip I of France in an attempt to take the English throne.

==== Africa ====
- Egyptian official Abu'l-Ala Abd al-Ghani ibn Nasr ibn Sa'id al-Dayf appointed Vizier in Egypt.

==== Asia ====
- Wang Anshi, Chinese chief chancellor of the Song dynasty, creates a new bureau of the central government (called the Directorate of Weapons), which supervises the manufacture of military armaments and ensures quality control.
- June 15 – Emperor Go-Sanjō dies after a 5-year reign and is succeeded by his 19-year-old son Shirakawa as the 72nd emperor of Japan.

=== By topic ===
==== Religion ====
- Pope Alexander II dies after a 11½-year pontificate at Rome. He is succeeded by Gregory VII as the 157th pope of the Catholic Church.
- Rabbi Yitchaki Alfassi finishes writing the Rif, an important work of Jewish law.
- John IX bar Shushan ends his term as Syriac Orthodox Patriarch of Antioch.

== Births ==
- David IV ("the Builder"), king of Georgia (d. 1125)
- Leopold III ("the Good"), margrave of Austria (d. 1136)
- Magnus Barefoot, king of Norway (d. 1103)
- Meng, Chinese empress consort of the Song dynasty (d. 1131)
- Shaykh Tabarsi, Persian Shia scholar (d. 1153)
- Thomas of Marle, lord of Coucy (d. 1130)
- Approximate date
  - Agnes of Waiblingen, daughter of Henry IV, Holy Roman Emperor (d. 1143)
  - Alfonso the Battler, king of Aragon (d. 1134)
  - Al-Tighnari, Moorish botanist and physician (d. 1118)
  - Anastatius IV, pope of the Catholic Church (d. 1154)
  - Philippa of Toulouse, French noblewoman (d. 1118)
  - Zbigniew, duke of Poland (d. 1113?)
  - Lady Six Monkey, queen of the Mixtec city State of Huachino and queen of Jaltepec (d. 1101)

== Deaths ==
- February 21 (approximate date) – Peter Damian, cardinal-bishop of Ostia (b. c. 1007)
- April 21 – Alexander II, pope of the Catholic Church (b. 1010/15)
- June 15 – Go-Sanjō, emperor of Japan (b. 1032)
- June 30 – Badis ibn Habus, Berber king of the Taifa of Granada (b. 1002)
- July 12 – John Gualbert, Italian monk, abbot and saint (b. c. 985)
- December 20 – Dominic of Silos, Spanish abbot (b. 1000)
- Anthony of Kiev, Russian monk and saint (b. 983)
- Zhou Dunyi, Chinese philosopher and cosmologist (b. 1017)
- Approximate date – Barisone I of Torres, Sardinian ruler (judge) of Arborea
