= Tengen (era) =

Japanese era from 978 to 983

Tengen (天元) was a Japanese era (年号, nengō; "year name") after Jōgen and before Eikan. This period spanned the years from November 978 through April 983. The reigning emperor was En'yū-tennō (円融天皇).

== Change of era ==
- February 20, 978 Tengen gannen (天元元年): The new era name was created to mark an event or a number of events. The previous era ended and a new one commenced in Jōgen 3, on the 15th day of the 4th month of 978.

== Events of the Tengen era ==
- 978 (Tengen 1, 8th month): The emperor allowed the daughter of Fujiwara no Kaneie to be introduced into his household; and shortly thereafter, they had a son.
- 978 (Tengen 1, 10th month): Fujiwara no Yoritada was elevated to the position of Daijō-daijin; Minamoto no Masanobu was made Sadaijin; and, Fujiwara no Kaneie was made Udaijin.

== Notes ==
Preceded by Jōgen	Era or nengō Tengen; 978–983	Succeeded by Eikan
