= Dětmar =

First Bishop of Prague from 973 to 982

Dětmar O.S.B.
- Bishop of Praha
- Church: Catholic Church
- Diocese: Diocese of Praha
- In office: 973 – 2 January 982
- Predecessor: Diocese established
- Successor: Adalbert of Prague

Orders
- Consecration: January 976 by Willigis

Personal details
- Born: Duchy of Saxony, East Francia
- Died: 2 January 982 Praha, Duchy of Bohemia

Dětmar, Thietmar or Dietmar (died 2 January 982 in Prague) was the first Bishop of Prague. He came from Saxony and learned to speak Czech. The diocese of Prague was assigned to the Archbishopric of Mainz, when Thietmar was elected as the first bishop in 973 at the time of government by Boleslaus II of Bohemia. The creation of the diocese gave Bohemia religious independence from the Empire. Thietmar was known to be a wise and pious man, who ordered the building of many churches and the first cathedral. He died in 982. Adalbert of Prague was elected as his successor.

Catholic Church titles
First Diocese established	Bishop of Prague; 973–982	Succeeded by Adalbert of Prague
