= Senhorinha of Basto =

10th-century Portuguese abbess and canonized saint

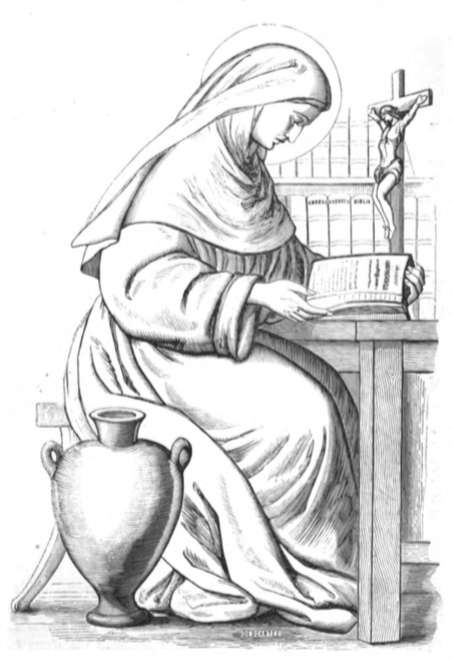
- Saint Senhorinha depicted with a water jug, from Charles Cahier's Caractéristiques des saints dans l'art populaire

Abbess
- Born: c. 924; Vieira do Minho
- Died: 22 April 982
- Venerated in: Roman Catholic Church; Eastern Orthodox Church
- Canonized: 1130 by Paio Mendes, Archbishop of Braga
- Feast: April 22
- Attributes: vessel, frog
- Patronage: Vieria
- Tradition or genre: Benedictine

Saint Senhorinha of Basto, also Senorina (Portuguese: Santa Senhorinha de Basto; c. 942 – 982) was a Portuguese Benedictine abbess in what is today northern Portugal. She is a saint in the Roman Catholic Church and Eastern Orthodox Church, and was related to Saint Rudesind of Mondoñedo.

== Life ==
Senhorinha of Basto is thought to have been born into the noble Sousa family as either Domitilla or Genoveva. After being raised by her aunt, Blessed Godinha, abbess of the Benedictine convent of St. John of Vieira, Senhorinha also joined the Benedictines and succeeded her aunt as abbess at Vieira. Later, she moved the convent of Vieira to Basto near Braga, Portugal in order to help the spiritual development of her community.

== Legacy ==
Senhorinha of Basto was canonized by Paio Mendes, Archbishop of Braga, in 1130, at a time when bishops had the authority to canonize faithful people in their dioceses. Her feast day is April 22, which is recorded in Portuguese liturgical calendars beginning in the 13th century.

Her shrine in Basto was a popular pilgrimage destination in the region in the 12th and 13th centuries. King Sancho I of Portugal was one famous devotee who made the pilgrimage to cure his son and heir, Afonso II, who was healed and succeeded Sancho I as king of Portugal. The church in Basto has been named in her honor since at least 1220, and water from a nearby fountain named after her is believed to have healing properties. Her tomb is housed in the church.

In art, she is typically depicted with a water jug or vessel at her side and sometimes a frog, in reference to one of the miracles she is said to have performed during her life.

== See also ==
- Kingdom of Galicia
