= Ibn Khalawayh =

10th-century Arabic grammarian and Qur'anic scholar

Abu Abdallah al-Husayn ibn Ahmad ibn Hamdan al-Hamadhani, better known simply as Ibn Khalawayh (ابن خالويه; 890s – 980/81), was a 10th-century scholar of Arabic grammar and Quranic exegesis. He was born in Hamadan. He was active at the court of Sayf al-Dawla, the Hamdanid ruler of Syria, at Aleppo.

Ibn Khalawayh was a famous scholar during his lifetime, and assembled a circle of disciples in regular literary reunions. He was active in the period of hectic philological activity towards a canonical text of the Qur'an. His grammatical opinions were eclectic, in between the major opposition between the grammatical schools of Basra and Kufa.
