= Judith of Brittany =

Duchess of Normandy

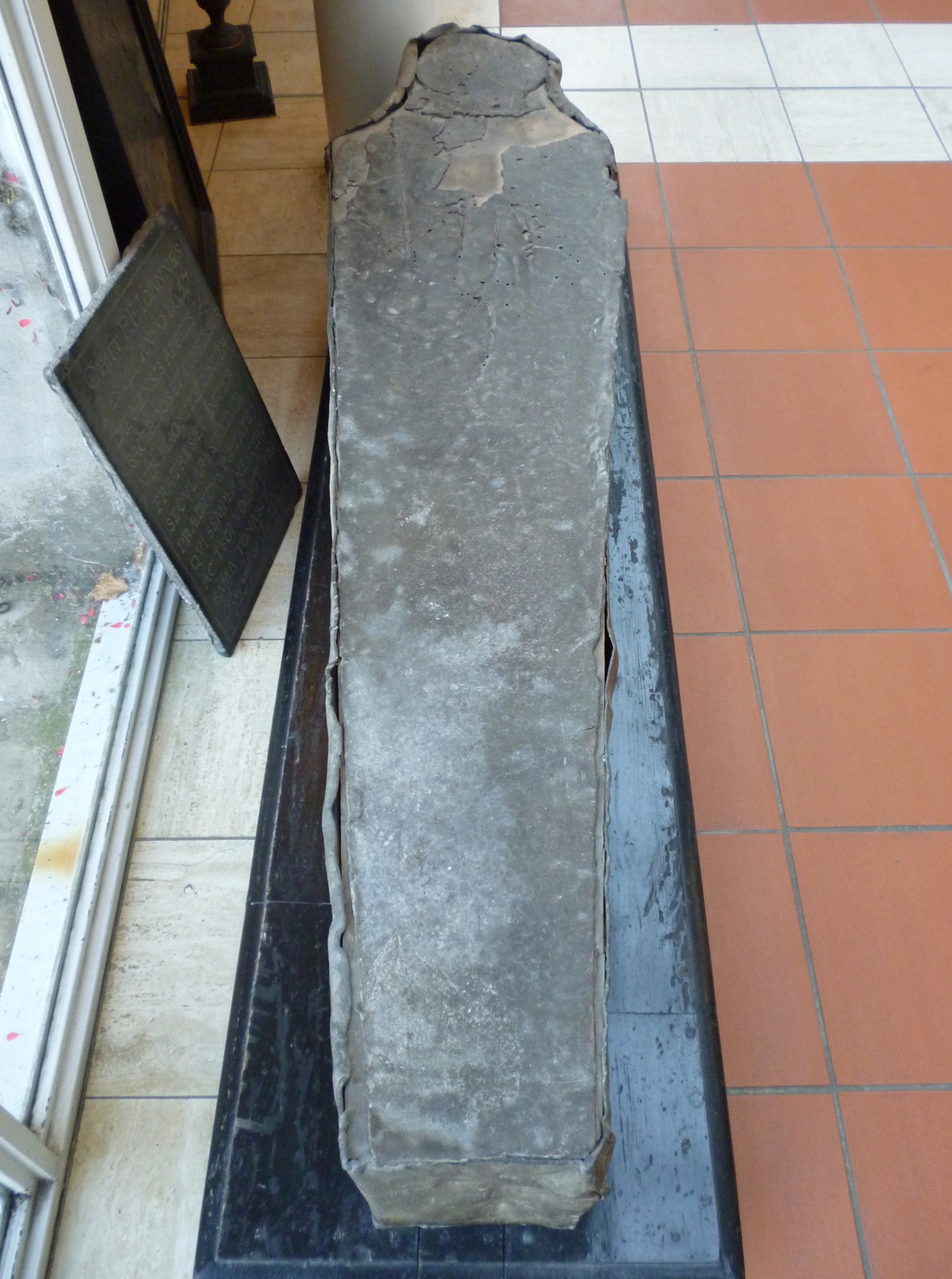
- Leaden sarcophagus of Judith of Brittany
- Born: c. 982
- Died: 1017 (aged 34–35)
- Burial: Abbey of Bernay, France
- Spouse: Richard II, Duke of Normandy
- Issue: Richard III, Duke of Normandy; Alice of Normandy; Robert I, Duke of Normandy; William of Normandy; Eleanor of Normandy; Matilda of Normandy
- House: Rennes
- Father: Conan I, Duke of Brittany
- Mother: Ermengarde-Gerberga of Anjou

Judith of Rennes (c. 982–1017) was Duchess of Normandy from c. 1000 until her death.

== Life ==
Judith, born in 982, was the daughter of Conan I, Duke of Brittany and Ermengarde-Gerberga of Anjou. She was a part of an important double marriage alliance between Normandy and Brittany first recorded by William of Jumièges.

In 996, her brother Geoffrey I, Duke of Brittany married Hawise of Normandy, daughter of Richard I, Duke of Normandy while in c. 1000 Judith married Richard II, Duke of Normandy, Hawise's brother. The duchess Judith died on 28 August 1017 and was buried in the abbey of Bernay, which she had founded in 1013.

== Family ==
Judith married Richard II, Duke of Normandy in c. 1000. They had:

- Richard III, Duke of Normandy
- Alice of Normandy, married Renaud I, Count of Burgundy.
- Robert I, Duke of Normandy
- Emma, (c. 1000/5, married to Richard, known as Turstin Haldup
- William (c. 1007/9), monk at Fécamp, d. 1025.
- Eleanor (c. 1011/3), married to Baldwin IV, Count of Flanders. (Note: Van Houts simply states a daughter of Judith and Richard married Baldwin, Count of Flanders.)
- Matilda (c. 1013/5), nun at Fécamp, d. 1033. She died young.

== Sources ==
- Bachrach, Bernard S. (1993). Fulk Nerra, the Neo-Roman Consul, 987-1040. University of California Press.
- Van Houts, Elisabeth, ed. (2000). The Normans in Europe. Manchester University Press.

Preceded by Gunnor	Duchess consort of Normandy; 996–1017	Succeeded by Papia of Envermeu
