= Conquereuil =

Conquereuil Concreüz (Gallo) Konkerel (Breton)
- Commune
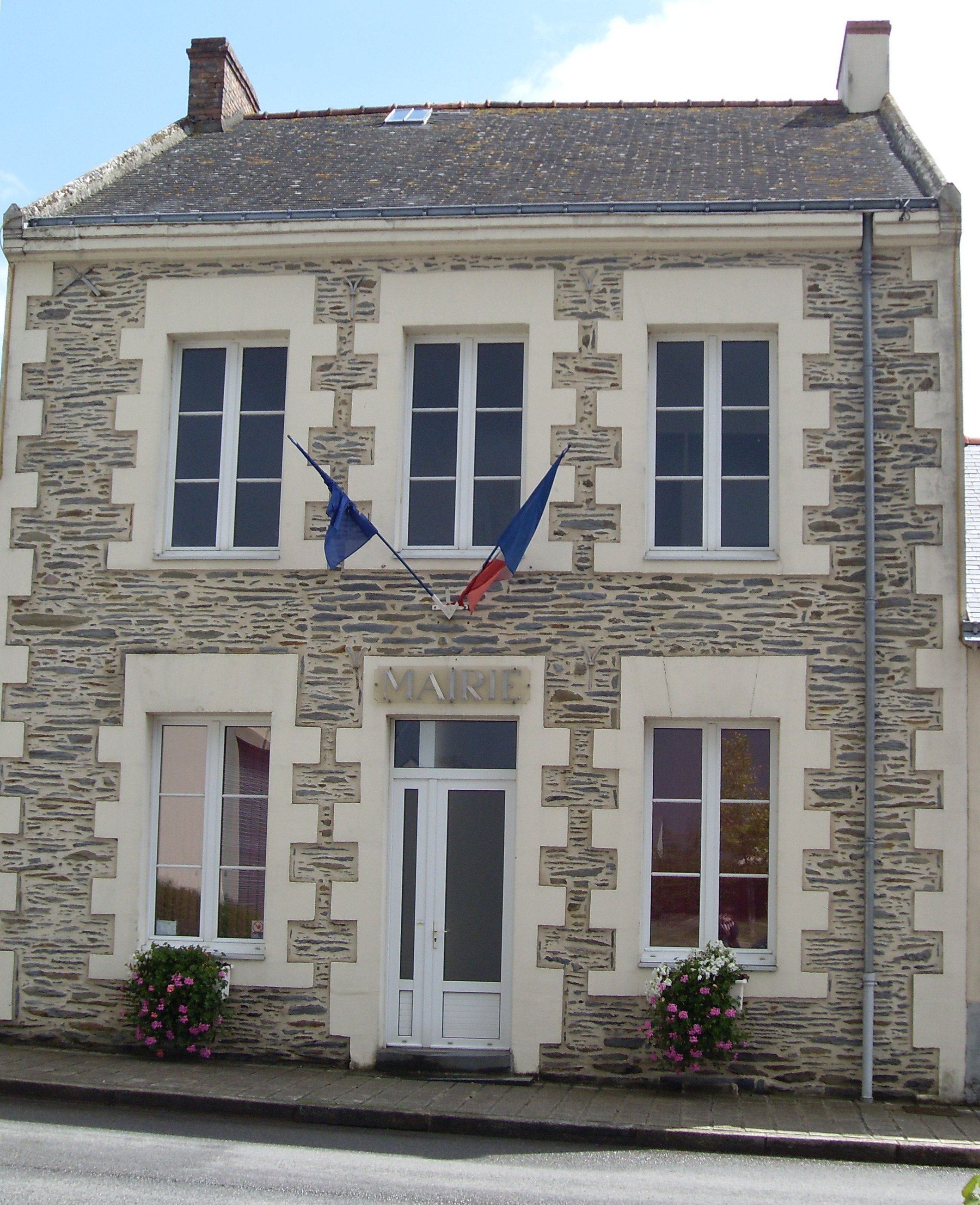
- Town hall

- Coat of arms
- Location of Conquereuil
- Location within France Location within Pays de la Loire
- Coordinates: 47°37′31″N 1°45′00″W
- Country: France
- Region: Pays de la Loire
- Department: Loire-Atlantique
- Arrondissement: Châteaubriant-Ancenis
- Canton: Guémené-Penfao
- Intercommunality: Redon Agglomération

Government
  - Mayor (2020–2026): Jacques Poulain
- Area^{1}: 32.87 km^{2} (12.69 sq mi)
- Elevation: 34 m (112 ft)
- Highest elevation: 57 m (187 ft)
- Lowest elevation: 7 m (23 ft)
- Population (2023): 1,061
  - Density: 32.28/km^{2} (83.60/sq mi)
- Time zone: UTC+01:00 (CET)
  - Summer (DST): UTC+02:00 (CEST)
- INSEE/Postal code: 44044 /44290
- ^{1} French Land Register data, which excludes lakes, ponds, glaciers > 1 km^{2} (0.386 sq mi or 247 acres) and river estuaries.

Conquereuil (French pronunciation: [kɔ̃kʁœj]; Gallo: Concreüz, Breton: Konkerel) is a commune in the Loire-Atlantique department in western France.

== Population ==
Historical population
Year	Pop.	±% p.a.
1968	1,048	—
1975	959	−1.26%
1982	929	−0.45%
1990	893	−0.49%
1999	955	+0.75%
2007	1,016	+0.78%
2012	1,061	+0.87%
2017	1,116	+1.02%
2023	1,061	−0.84%
Source: INSEE

== See also ==
- Communes of the Loire-Atlantique department
