= Japanese imperial tombs =

List of tombs of emperors of Japan

This is a list of tombs or mausoleums of Japanese Emperors according to the Imperial Household Agency. Its 124 entries include historic emperors as well as legendary emperors.

== Tombs ==
Key

^	Legendary Emperors

#	Emperor	Died	Tomb	Alternative name	Type	Location	Image
1	Emperor Jimmu^{*}	April 9, 585 BC	unebiyama no ushitora no sumi no misasagi (畝傍山東北陵)		knoll, hummock (円丘)	Ōkubochō, Kashihara, Nara; 34°29′50.91″N 135°47′16.65″E	Wooden torii gate and concrete fence in front of trees.
2	Emperor Suizei^{*}	549 BC	tsukida no oka no e no misasagi (桃花鳥田丘上陵)		knoll, hummock (円丘)	Shijō Kofun group, Shijōchō, Kashihara, Nara; 34°30′1.74″N 135°47′22.91″E	
3	Emperor Annei^{*}	511 BC	unebiyama no hitsujisaru no mihodo no i no e no misasagi (畝傍山西南御陰井上陵)		mountain (山形)	Yoshidachō, Kashihara, Nara; 34°29′23.59″N 135°46′42.64″E	Torii gate and concrete fence among trees.
4	Emperor Itoku^{*}	476 BC	unebiyama no minami no manago no tani no e no misasagi (畝傍山南纖沙溪上陵)		mountain (山形)	Nishiikejirichō, Kashihara, Nara; 34°29′17.01″N 135°46′54.9″E	Concrete torii gate behind two concrete fences and in front of a group of trees.
5	Emperor Kōshō^{*}	393 BC	waki no kami no hakata no yama no e no misasagi (掖上博多山上陵)		mountain (山形)	Mimuro, Gose, Nara; 34°27′28.03″N 135°43′51.38″E	—
6	Emperor Kōan^{*}	291 BC	tamate no oka no e no misasagi (玉手丘上陵)		knoll, hummock (円丘)	Tamade, Gose, Nara; 34°27′19.07″N 135°44′57.1″E	—
7	Emperor Kōrei^{*}	215 BC	kataoka no umasaka no misasagi (片丘馬坂陵)		mountain (山形)	Ōji, Kitakatsuragi, Nara; 34°35′20.69″N 135°42′5.3″E	—
8	Emperor Kōgen^{*}	158 BC	tsurugi no ike no shima no e no misasagi (池嶋上陵)		keyhole-shaped (前方後円)	Ishikawachō, Kashihara, Nara; 34°28′52.82″N 135°48′10.64″E	—
9	Emperor Kaika^{*}	98 BC	kasuga no izakawa no saka no e no misasagi (春日率川坂上陵)	Nenbutsuji-yama Kofun	keyhole-shaped (前方後円)	Aburasakachō, Nara, Nara; 34°41′0.35″N 135°49′26.73″E	Raked gravel and a torii gate inside a concrete fence enclosure.
10	Emperor Sujin^{*}	30 BC	yama no be no michi no magari no oka no e no misasagi (山邊道勾岡上陵)	Andōyama mound	keyhole-shaped (前方後円)	Yanagimotochō, Tenri, Nara; 34°33′27.07″N 135°50′56.84″E	—
11	Emperor Suinin^{*}	70	sugawara no fushimi no higashi no misasagi (菅原伏見東陵)	Hōraiyama Kofun	keyhole-shaped (前方後円)	Amagatsuji Nishimachi, Nara, Nara; 34°40′47.62″N 135°46′52.35″E	Torii gate behind a concrete fence. In the back behind the torii there is water and behind it trees.
12	Emperor Keikō^{*}	130	yama no be no michi no e no misasagi (山邊道上陵)	Shibutani-mukō mound	keyhole-shaped (前方後円)	Shibutanichō, Tenri, Nara; 34°33′2.19″N 135°50′55.14″E	—
13	Emperor Seimu^{*}	July 30, 190	saki no tatanami no ikejiri no misasagi (狹城盾列池後陵)	Saki Ishizuka-yama Kofun	keyhole-shaped (前方後円)	Misasagichō, Nara, Nara; 34°42′0.34″N 135°47′14.6″E	Torii gate behind two concrete fences. In the background there are trees.
14	Emperor Chūai^{*}	200	ega no nagano no nishi no misasagi (惠我長野西陵)	Okamisanzai Kofun	keyhole-shaped (前方後円)	Fujiidera 4-chōme, Fujiidera, Osaka; 34°33′55.51″N 135°35′38.37″E	—
-	Empress Jingū			Gosashi tomb			
15	Emperor Ōjin^{*}	310	ega no mofushi no oka no misasagi (惠我藻伏崗陵)	Kondayama Kofun	keyhole-shaped (前方後円)	Konda 6-chōme, Habikino, Osaka; 34°33′46.47″N 135°36′32.6″E	—
16	Emperor Nintoku	399	mozu no mimihara no naka no misasagi (百舌鳥耳原中陵)	Daisen Kofun	keyhole-shaped (前方後円)	Daisenchō, Sakai-ku, Sakai, Osaka; 34°33′50.16″N 135°29′14.45″E	Bird eye view of a large keyhole-shaped island surrounded by a moat and trees.
17	Emperor Richū	405	mozu no mimihara no minami no misasagi (百舌鳥耳原南陵)	Kami Ishizu Misanzai (上石津ミサンザイ古墳)	keyhole-shaped (前方後円)	Ishizugaoka, Nishi-ku, Sakai, Osaka; 34°33′14.73″N 135°28′39.22″E	—
18	Emperor Hanzei	410	mozu no mimihara no kita no misasagi (百舌鳥耳原北陵)	Tadeiyama Kofun	keyhole-shaped (前方後円)	Kitamikunigaokachō, Sakai-ku, Sakai, Osaka; 34°34′32.81″N 135°29′18.27″E	Torii gate and trees behind a stone fence.
19	Emperor Ingyō	453	ega no nagano no kita no misasagi (惠我長野北陵)	Ichinoyama Kofun (市ノ山古墳（市野山古墳)	keyhole-shaped (前方後円)	Kou 1-chōme, Fujiidera, Osaka; 34°34′24.7″N 135°37′0.17″E	—
20	Emperor Ankō	456	sugawara no fushimi no nishi no misasagi (菅原伏見西陵)		方丘	Hōrai 4-chōme, Nara, Nara; 34°41′0.31″N 135°46′8.98″E	Path leading to a torii gate among trees.
21	Emperor Yūryaku	479	tajihi no takawashi no hara no misasagi (丹比高鷲原陵)	Okamisanzai Kofun	円丘	Shimaizumi 8-chōme, Habikino, Osaka; 34°34′34.75″N 135°35′8.55″E	—
22	Emperor Seinei	484	kōchi no sakada no hara no misasagi (河坂門原陵)	Shiragayama Kofun	keyhole-shaped (前方後円)	Nishiura 6-chōme, Habikino, Osaka; 34°32′55.93″N 135°36′1.31″E	—
23	Emperor Kenzō	487	kataoka no iwatsuki no oka no minami no misasagi (傍丘磐坏丘南陵)		keyhole-shaped (前方後円)	Kitaimaichi, Kashiba, Nara; 34°33′2.7″N 135°42′1.73″E	—
24	Emperor Ninken	498	hanyū no sakamoto no misasagi (埴生坂本陵)	Bokeyama Kofun	keyhole-shaped (前方後円)	Aoyama 3-chōme, Fujiidera, Osaka; 34°33′23″N 135°35′47.72″E	—
25	Emperor Buretsu	506	kataoka no iwatsuki no oka no kita no misasagi (傍丘磐坏丘北陵)		山形	Imaizumi, Kashiba, Nara; 34°33′39.35″N 135°41′44.14″E	—
26	Emperor Keitai	531	mishima no aino no misasagi (三嶋藍野陵)	Oda Chausuyama Kofun	keyhole-shaped (前方後円)	Ōda 3-chōme, Ibaraki, Osaka; 34°50′40.21″N 135°34′42.44″E	—
27	Emperor Ankan	536	furuchi no takaya no oka no misasagi (古市高屋丘陵)	Takayatukiyama Kofun	keyhole-shaped (前方後円)	Furuichi 6-chōme, Habikino, Osaka; 34°32′55.48″N 135°36′34.6″E	Torii gate among trees near a street.
28	Emperor Senka	539	musa no tsukisaka no e no misasagi (身狹桃花鳥坂上陵)	Toriya Misanzai Kofun	keyhole-shaped (前方後円)	Toriyachō, Kashihara, Nara; 34°28′42.05″N 135°46′48.8″E	—
29	Emperor Kimmei	571	hinokuma no saka ai no misasagi (檜隈坂合陵)	Umeyama Kofun	keyhole-shaped (前方後円)	Hirata, Asuka, Takaichi District, Nara; 34°28′7.03″N 135°48′2.96″E	—
30	Emperor Bidatsu	September 14, 585	kōchi no shinaga no naka no o no misasagi (河磯長中尾陵)		keyhole-shaped (前方後円)	Taishi, Minamikawachi District, Osaka; 34°30′42.56″N 135°38′7.71″E	—
31	Emperor Yōmei	587	kōchi no shinaga no hara no misasagi (河磯長原陵)	Kasuga Mukaiyama Kofun	方丘	Taishi, Minamikawachi District, Osaka; 34°31′0.36″N 135°38′39.15″E	—
32	Emperor Sushun	593	kurahashi no oka no misasagi (倉梯岡陵)	Akasaka Tennozan Kofun	knoll, hummock (円丘)	Kurahashi, Sakurai, Nara; 34°29′24.76″N 135°51′37.61″E	—
33	Empress Suiko	April 15, 628	shinaga no yamada no misasagi (磯長山田陵)	Yamada Takazuka Kofun (山田高塚古墳)	方丘	Yamada, Taishi, Minamikawachi District, Osaka; 34°30′42.57″N 135°38′58.07″E	Wooden torii gate behind a stone fence in front of trees.
34	Emperor Jomei	November 17, 641	osaka no uchi no misasagi (押坂内陵)	Dannozuka Kofun	上円下方	Otsusaka, Sakurai, Nara; 34°30′28.35″N 135°52′32.63″E	—
35, 37	Empress Kōgyoku (Saimei)	661	ochi no oka no e no misasagi (越智崗上陵)		円丘	Kurumaki, Takatori, Takaichi District, Nara; 34°27′27.8″N 135°46′5.43″E	—
36	Emperor Kōtoku	November 24, 654	osaka no shinaga no misasagi (大阪磯長陵)	Yamada Uenoyama Kofun	円丘	Yamada, Taishi, Minamikawachi District, Osaka; 34°31′3.67″N 135°39′15.32″E	White torii gate behind a concrete fence in front of woods.
38	Emperor Tenji	January 7, 672	yamashina no misasagi (山科陵)	Mausoleum of Emperor Tenji	上円下方	Misasagikamigobyono-chō, Yamashina Ward, Kyoto, Kyoto; 34°59′50.75″N 135°48′25.32″E	White torii gate behind a concrete fence in front of woods.
39	Emperor Kōbun	August 21, 672	nagara no yamasaki no misasagi (長等山陵)		円丘	Goryō-chō, Ōtsu, Shiga; 35°1′5.41″N 135°51′13.91″E	—
40	Emperor Temmu	October 1, 686	hi no kuma no ōuchi no misasagi (檜隈大陵) (same as Empress Jitō)	Noguchi Obo Kofun	円丘	Noguchi, Asuka, Takaichi District, Nara; 34°28′7.76″N 135°48′27.95″E	Torii gate behind a white stone fence in front of trees.
41	Empress Jitō	January 13, 703	hi no kuma no ōuchi no misasagi (檜隈大陵) (same as Emperor Temmu)	Noguchi Obo Kofun	円丘	Noguchi, Asuka, Takaichi District, Nara; 34°28′7.76″N 135°48′27.95″E	Torii gate behind a white stone fence in front of trees.
42	Emperor Mommu	July 18, 707	hi no kuma no ako no oka no e no misasagi (檜隈安古岡上陵)	Kurihara Tsukaana Kofun	山形	Kurihara, Asuka, Takaichi District, Nara; 34°27′38.24″N 135°48′26.33″E	—
43	Empress Gemmei	December 29, 721	nahoyama no higashi no misasagi (奈保山東陵)		山形	Narazaka-chō, Nara, Nara; 34°42′17.93″N 135°49′46.08″E	—
44	Empress Genshō	May 22, 748	nahoyama no nishi no misasagi (奈保山西陵)		山形	Narazaka-chō, Nara, Nara; 34°42′20.6″N 135°49′34.19″E	—
45	Emperor Shōmu	June 4, 756	sahoyama no minami no misasagi (佐保山南陵)		山形	Hōren-chō, Nara, Nara; 34°41′37.29″N 135°49′46.62″E	—
46, 48	Empress Kōken (Shōtoku)	August 28, 770	takano no misasagi (高野陵)	Saki Takatsuka Kofun	前方後円	Misasagi-chō, Nara, Nara; 34°41′54.53″N 135°47′14.99″E	White torii gate behind a concrete fence in front of trees.
47	Emperor Junnin	November 10, 765	awaji no misasagi (淡路陵)		山形	Kashu, Minamiawaji, Hyōgo; 34°15′50.88″N 134°44′36.5″E	—
49	Emperor Kōnin	January 11, 782	tahara no higashi no misasagi (田原東陵)		円丘	Higasa-chō, Nara, Nara; 34°40′4.2″N 135°54′48.2″E	—
50	Emperor Kammu	February 5, 806	kashiwabara no misasagi (柏原陵)		円丘	Momoyama-chō Nagaikyūtarō, Fushimi Ward, Kyoto, Kyoto; 34°56′24.04″N 135°46′29.3″E	—
51	Emperor Heizei	August 5, 824	yamamomo no misasagi (楊梅陵)		円丘	Saki-chō, Nara, Nara; 34°41′47.51″N 135°47′49.9″E	—
52	Emperor Saga	August 24, 842	saga no yama no e no misasagi (嵯峨山上陵)		円丘	Kitasaga Asaharayama-chō, Ukyō Ward, Kyoto, Kyoto; 35°1′59.39″N 135°40′24.98″E	—
53	Emperor Junna	June 11, 840	ōharano no nishi no mine no e no misasagi (大原野西嶺上陵)		円丘	Ōharano Minamikasuga-chō, Nishikyō Ward, Kyoto, Kyoto; 34°57′42.76″N 135°38′1.99″E	—
54	Emperor Ninmyō	May 6, 850	fukakusa no misasagi (深草陵)		方形	Fukakusa Higashidate-chō, Fushimi Ward, Kyoto, Kyoto; 34°57′22.09″N 135°46′46.62″E	—
55	Emperor Montoku	October 7, 858	tamura no misasagi (田邑陵)		円丘	Uzumasa Sanbicho-chō, Ukyō Ward, Kyoto, Kyoto; 35°1′27.97″N 135°42′6.34″E	—
56	Emperor Seiwa	December 31, 878	mizu no oyama no misasagi (水尾山陵)		円丘	Sagamizuoseiwa, Ukyō Ward, Kyoto, Kyoto; 35°2′46.11″N 135°37′18.29″E	—
57	Emperor Yōzei	949	kaguragaoka no higashi no misasagi (樂岡東陵)		八角丘	Jōdoji Shinnyo-chō, Sakyō Ward, Kyoto, Kyoto; 35°1′20.95″N 135°47′14.5″E	White torii and concrete fence in front of trees.
58	Emperor Kōkō	August 26, 887	nochi no tamura no misasagi (後田邑陵)		knoll, hummock (円丘)	Utanobaba-chō, Ukyō Ward, Kyoto, Kyoto; 35°1′40.78″N 135°42′41.2″E	—
59	Emperor Uda	July 19, 931	ōuchiyama no misasagi (大内山陵)		方丘	Uda no Tani, Narutaki, Ukyō Ward, Kyoto, Kyoto; 35°2′19.58″N 135°42′45.39″E	—
60	Emperor Daigo	October 23, 930	nochi no yamashina no misasagi (後山科陵)		円形	Daigofurumichi-chō, Fushimi Ward, Kyoto, Kyoto; 34°57′30.97″N 135°49′12.02″E	—
61	Emperor Suzaku	October 7, 952	daigo no misasagi (醍醐陵)		円丘	Daigogoryōhigashiura-chō, Fushimi Ward, Kyoto, Kyoto; 34°57′16.91″N 135°49′18.31″E	—
62	Emperor Murakami	July 5, 967	murakami no misasagi (村上陵)		円丘	Uda no Tani, Narutaki, Ukyō Ward, Kyoto, Kyoto; 35°2′0.78″N 135°42′28.59″E	—
63	Emperor Reizei	November 21, 1011	sakuramoto no misasagi (櫻本陵)		円丘	Hōnenin-chō, Shishigatani, Sakyō Ward, Kyoto, Kyoto; 35°1′18.24″N 135°47′43.8″E	White torii beyond concrete fence.
64	Emperor En'yū	March 1, 991	nochi no murakami no misasagi (後村上陵)		円丘	Utanofukuōjicho-chō, Ukyō Ward, Kyoto, Kyoto; 35°1′48.21″N 135°42′27.43″E	—
65	Emperor Kazan	February 8, 1008	kamiyagawa no hotori no misasagi (紙屋川上陵)		方丘	Kitatakahashi-chō, Kinugasa, Kita Ward, Kyoto, Kyoto; 35°2′12.77″N 135°44′4.42″E	—
66	Emperor Ichijō	July 25, 1011	enyūji no kita no misasagi (圓融寺北陵)		円丘	Ryōan-ji Shuuyama, Ukyō Ward, Kyoto, Kyoto; 35°2′9.95″N 135°43′12.22″E	—
67	Emperor Sanjō	June 5, 1017	kitayama no misasagi (北山陵)		円丘	Kinugasa Nishisonjōin-chō, Kita Ward, Kyoto, Kyoto; 35°2′31.75″N 135°43′57.44″E	—
68	Emperor Go-Ichijō	May 15, 1036	bodaijuin no misasagi (菩提樹院陵)		円丘	Yoshidakaguraokacho-chō, Shishigatani, Sakyō Ward, Kyoto, Kyoto; 35°1′24.6″N 135°47′12.79″E	Torii behind concrete fence.
69	Emperor Go-Suzaku	February 7, 1045	enjōji no misasagi (圓乘寺陵)		円丘	Ryōan-ji Shuuyama, Ukyō Ward, Kyoto, Kyoto; 35°2′6.69″N 135°43′4.69″E	—
70	Emperor Go-Reizei	May 22, 1068	enkyōji no misasagi (圓寺陵)		円丘	Ryōan-ji Shuuyama, Ukyō Ward, Kyoto, Kyoto; 35°2′6.44″N 135°43′4.02″E	—
71	Emperor Go-Sanjō	June 15, 1073	ensōji no misasagi (圓宗寺陵)		円丘	Ryōan-ji Shuuyama, Ukyō Ward, Kyoto, Kyoto; 35°2′6.83″N 135°43′2.86″E	—
72	Emperor Shirakawa	July 24, 1129	jōbodai-in no misasagi (成菩提院陵)		方丘	Takeda Jōbodaiin-chō, Fushimi Ward, Kyoto, Kyoto; 34°57′7.04″N 135°45′4.38″E	—
73	Emperor Horikawa	August 9, 1107	nochi no enkyōji no misasagi (後圓寺陵)		円丘	Ryōan-ji Shuuyama, Ukyō Ward, Kyoto, Kyoto; 35°2′8.94″N 135°43′11.58″E	—
74	Emperor Toba	July 20, 1156	anrakuju-in no misasagi (安樂壽院陵)		方形堂	Takeda Jōbodaiin-chō, Fushimi Ward, Kyoto, Kyoto; 34°57′9.87″N 135°45′13.01″E	—
75	Emperor Sutoku	September 14, 1164	shiramine no misasagi (白峯陵)		方丘	Ōmi-chō, Sakaide, Kagawa; 34°20′4.32″N 133°55′33.72″E	Torii and concrete fence among trees.
76	Emperor Konoe	August 22, 1155	anrakuju-in no minami no misasagi (安樂壽院南陵)		多宝塔	Takeda Jōbodaiin-chō, Fushimi Ward, Kyoto, Kyoto; 34°57′6.92″N 135°45′15.89″E	—
77	Emperor Go-Shirakawa	April 26, 1192	Hōjū-ji no misasagi (法住寺陵)		方形堂	Sanjusangendō-mawari-chō, Higashiyama Ward, Kyoto, Kyoto; 34°59′14.98″N 135°46′23.48″E	—
78	Emperor Nijō	September 5, 1165	Kōryū-ji no misasagi (香隆寺陵)		円丘	Hirano Hatchoyanagi-chō, Kita Ward, Kyoto, Kyoto; 35°1′51.98″N 135°43′45.37″E	—
79	Emperor Rokujō	August 23, 1176	Seikan-ji no misasagi (清閑寺陵)		円丘	Seikan-ji Utanonakayama-chō, Higashiyama Ward, Kyoto, Kyoto; 34°59′27.4″N 135°47′19.02″E	—
80	Emperor Takakura	January 30, 1181	nochi no Seikan-ji no misasagi (後清閑寺陵)		方丘	Seikan-ji Utanonakayama-chō, Higashiyama Ward, Kyoto, Kyoto; 34°59′25.85″N 135°47′17.95″E	—
81	Emperor Antoku	April 25, 1185	Amida-ji no misasagi (阿彌陀寺陵)		円丘	Amidaji-chō, Shimonoseki, Yamaguchi; 33°57′33.37″N 130°56′54.82″E	—
82	Emperor Go-Toba	March 28, 1239	Ōhara no misasagi (大原陵) (same as Emperor Juntoku)		十三重塔	Ōharashōrinin-chō, Sakyō Ward, Kyoto, Kyoto; 35°7′13.86″N 135°50′5.48″E	Concrete fence and torii in front of a hedge and trees.
83	Emperor Tsuchimikado	November 6, 1231	kanegahara no misasagi (金原陵)		八角丘	Kongenji Kanegahara, Nagaokakyō, Kyoto; 34°55′1.59″N 135°40′13.36″E	—
84	Emperor Juntoku	October 7, 1242	Ōhara no misasagi (大原陵) (same as Emperor Go-Toba)		円丘	Ōharashōrinin-chō, Sakyō Ward, Kyoto, Kyoto; 35°7′13.86″N 135°50′5.48″E	Concrete fence and torii in front of a hedge and trees.
85	Emperor Chūkyō	June 18, 1234	kujō no misasagi (九條陵)		円丘	Fukakusa Honji Yama-chō, Fushimi Ward, Kyoto, Kyoto; 34°58′26.63″N 135°46′36.2″E	—
86	Emperor Go-Horikawa	August 31, 1234	Kanon-ji no misasagi (觀音寺陵)		円丘	Imagumano Senzan-chō, Higashiyama Ward, Kyoto, Kyoto; 34°58′44.32″N 135°46′54.08″E	—
87	Emperor Shijō	February 10, 1242	Tsuki no wa no misasagi (月輪陵)		九重塔	Imagumano Senzan-chō, Higashiyama Ward, Kyoto, Kyoto; 34°58′38.18″N 135°46′54.94″E	—
88	Emperor Go-Saga	March 17, 1272	Saga no minami no misasagi (嵯峨南陵)		方形堂	Tenryū-ji grounds, Tenryuji Susukinobaba-chō, Saga, Ukyō Ward, Kyoto, Kyoto; 35°0′59.24″N 135°40′25.77″E	Structure with pointy roof behind a wooden fence and gate.
89	Emperor Go-Fukakusa	August 17, 1304	Fukakusa no kita no misasagi (深草北陵)		方形堂	Fukakusa Bo-chō, Fushimi Ward, Kyoto, Kyoto; 34°57′33.93″N 135°46′35.75″E	—
90	Emperor Kameyama	October 4, 1305	Kameyama no misasagi (龜山陵)		方形堂	Tenryū-ji grounds, Tenryuji Susukinobaba-chō, Saga, Ukyō Ward, Kyoto, Kyoto; 35°0′59.19″N 135°40′25.32″E	Structure with pointy roof behind a wooden fence and gate.
91	Emperor Go-Uda	July 16, 1324	rengebuji no misasagi (蓮華峯寺陵)		方形堂, 五輪塔	Kitasaga Asaharayama-chō, Ukyō Ward, Kyoto, Kyoto; 35°2′1.33″N 135°41′4.31″E	Wooden fence and gate among trees.
92	Emperor Fushimi	October 8, 1317	Fukakusa no kita no misasagi (深草北陵)		方形堂	Fukakusa Bo-chō, Fushimi Ward, Kyoto, Kyoto; 34°57′33.93″N 135°46′35.75″E	—
93	Emperor Go-Fushimi	May 17, 1336	Fukakusa no kita no misasagi (深草北陵)		方形堂	Fukakusa Bo-chō, Fushimi Ward, Kyoto, Kyoto; 34°57′33.93″N 135°46′35.75″E	—
94	Emperor Go-Nijō	September 10, 1308	Kitashirakawa no misasagi (北白河陵)		円丘	Kitashirakawa Oiwake-chō, Sakyō Ward, Kyoto, Kyoto; 35°1′45.63″N 135°47′4.15″E	Torii beyond concrete fence.
95	Emperor Hanazono	December 2, 1348	Jūrakuin no ue no misasagi (十樂院上陵)		円丘	Awataguchi Sanjobochō, Higashiyama Ward, Kyoto, Kyoto; 35°0′24.99″N 135°47′3.23″E	—
96	Emperor Go-Daigo	September 19, 1339	Tō no o no misasagi (塔尾陵)		円丘	Nyoirin-ji grounds, Yoshinoyama, Yoshino, Nara; 34°21′48.45″N 135°52′1.04″E	Torii behind stone fence.
97	Emperor Go-Murakami	March 29, 1368	Hinoo no misasagi (檜尾陵)		円丘	Kanshin-ji grounds, Kawachinagano, Osaka; 34°26′14.53″N 135°36′4.06″E	Stone lanterns and torii behind stone fence.
98	Emperor Chōkei	August 27, 1394	Saga no higashi no misasagi (嵯峨東陵)		円丘	Saga Tenryūji Suminokurachō, Ukyō Ward, Kyoto, Kyoto; 35°0′55.82″N 135°40′50.96″E	—
99	Emperor Go-Kameyama	May 10, 1424	Saga no ogura no misasagi (嵯峨小倉陵)		五輪塔	Saga Toriimoto Kozakachō, Ukyō Ward, Kyoto, Kyoto; 35°1′29.27″N 135°39′59.45″E	—
100	Emperor Go-Komatsu	December 1, 1433	Fukakusa no kita no misasagi (深草北陵)		方形堂	Fukakusa Bo-chō, Fushimi Ward, Kyoto, Kyoto; 34°57′33.93″N 135°46′35.75″E	—
101	Emperor Shōkō	August 30, 1428	Fukakusa no kita no misasagi (深草北陵)		方形堂	Fukakusa Bo-chō, Fushimi Ward, Kyoto, Kyoto; 34°57′33.93″N 135°46′35.75″E	—
102	Emperor Go-Hanazono	January 18, 1471	nochi no yamakuni no misasagi (後山國陵)		宝篋印塔	Jōshōkō-ji grounds, Maruyama, Keihokuidochō, Ukyō Ward, Kyoto, Kyoto; 35°12′3.93″N 135°41′9.64″E	—
103	Emperor Go-Tsuchimikado	October 21, 1500	Fukakusa no kita no misasagi (深草北陵)		方形堂	Fukakusa Bo-chō, Fushimi Ward, Kyoto, Kyoto; 34°57′33.93″N 135°46′35.75″E	—
104	Emperor Go-Kashiwabara	May 19, 1526	Fukakusa no kita no misasagi (深草北陵)		方形堂	Fukakusa Bo-chō, Fushimi Ward, Kyoto, Kyoto; 34°57′33.93″N 135°46′35.75″E	—
105	Emperor Go-Nara	September 27, 1557	Fukakusa no kita no misasagi (深草北陵)		方形堂	Fukakusa Bo-chō, Fushimi Ward, Kyoto, Kyoto; 34°57′33.93″N 135°46′35.75″E	—
106	Emperor Ōgimachi	February 6, 1593	Fukakusa no kita no misasagi (深草北陵)		方形堂	Fukakusa Bo-chō, Fushimi Ward, Kyoto, Kyoto; 34°57′33.93″N 135°46′35.75″E	—
107	Emperor Go-Yōzei	September 25, 1617	Fukakusa no kita no misasagi (深草北陵)		方形堂	Fukakusa Bo-chō, Fushimi Ward, Kyoto, Kyoto; 34°57′33.93″N 135°46′35.75″E	—
108	Emperor Go-Mizunoo	September 11, 1680	Tsuki no wa no misasagi (月輪陵)		九重塔	Sennyū-ji grounds, Imagumano Senzanchō, Higashiyama Ward, Kyoto, Kyoto; 34°58′38.17″N 135°46′54.97″E	—
109	Empress Meishō	January 9, 1624	Tsuki no wa no misasagi (月輪陵)		九重塔	Sennyū-ji grounds, Imagumano Senzanchō, Higashiyama Ward, Kyoto, Kyoto; 34°58′38.17″N 135°46′54.97″E	—
110	Emperor Go-Kōmyō	April 20, 1633	Tsuki no wa no misasagi (月輪陵)		九重塔	Sennyū-ji grounds, Imagumano Senzanchō, Higashiyama Ward, Kyoto, Kyoto; 34°58′38.17″N 135°46′54.97″E	—
111	Emperor Go-Sai	March 22, 1685	Tsuki no wa no misasagi (月輪陵)		九重塔	Sennyū-ji grounds, Imagumano Senzanchō, Higashiyama Ward, Kyoto, Kyoto; 34°58′38.17″N 135°46′54.97″E	—
112	Emperor Reigen	September 24, 1732	Tsuki no wa no misasagi (月輪陵)		九重塔	Sennyū-ji grounds, Imagumano Senzanchō, Higashiyama Ward, Kyoto, Kyoto; 34°58′38.17″N 135°46′54.97″E	—
113	Emperor Higashiyama	January 16, 1710	Tsuki no wa no misasagi (月輪陵)		九重塔	Sennyū-ji grounds, Imagumano Senzanchō, Higashiyama Ward, Kyoto, Kyoto; 34°58′38.17″N 135°46′54.97″E	—
114	Emperor Nakamikado	May 10, 1737	Tsuki no wa no misasagi (月輪陵)		九重塔	Sennyū-ji grounds, Imagumano Senzanchō, Higashiyama Ward, Kyoto, Kyoto; 34°58′38.17″N 135°46′54.97″E	—
115	Emperor Sakuramachi	May 28, 1750	Tsuki no wa no misasagi (月輪陵)		九重塔	Sennyū-ji grounds, Imagumano Senzanchō, Higashiyama Ward, Kyoto, Kyoto; 34°58′38.17″N 135°46′54.97″E	—
116	Emperor Momozono	August 31, 1762	Tsuki no wa no misasagi (月輪陵)		九重塔	Sennyū-ji grounds, Imagumano Senzanchō, Higashiyama Ward, Kyoto, Kyoto; 34°58′38.17″N 135°46′54.97″E	—
117	Empress Go-Sakuramachi	December 24, 1813	Tsuki no wa no misasagi (月輪陵)		九重塔	Sennyū-ji grounds, Imagumano Senzanchō, Higashiyama Ward, Kyoto, Kyoto; 34°58′38.17″N 135°46′54.97″E	—
118	Emperor Go-Momozono	December 16, 1779	Tsuki no wa no misasagi (月輪陵)		九重塔	Sennyū-ji grounds, Imagumano Senzanchō, Higashiyama Ward, Kyoto, Kyoto; 34°58′38.17″N 135°46′54.97″E	—
119	Emperor Kōkaku	December 11, 1840	Nochi no tsuki no wa no misasagi (後月輪陵)		九重塔	Sennyū-ji grounds, Imagumano Senzanchō, Higashiyama Ward, Kyoto, Kyoto; 34°58′38.17″N 135°46′54.97″E	—
120	Emperor Ninkō	February 21, 1846	Nochi no tsuki no wa no misasagi (後月輪陵)		九重塔	Sennyū-ji grounds, Imagumano Senzanchō, Higashiyama Ward, Kyoto, Kyoto; 34°58′38.17″N 135°46′54.97″E	—
121	Emperor Kōmei	January 30, 1867	Nochi no tsuki no wa no higashi no misasagi (後月輪東山陵)		円丘	Sennyū-ji grounds, Imagumano Senzanchō, Higashiyama Ward, Kyoto, Kyoto; 34°58′38.85″N 135°46′58.68″E	—
123	Emperor Meiji	July 30, 1912	Fushimi no momoyama no misasagi (伏見桃山陵)		上円下方	Kojozan Momoyamachō, Fushimi Ward, Kyoto, Kyoto; 34°56′11.64″N 135°46′52.2″E	—
123	Emperor Taishō	December 25, 1926	Tama no misasagi (多摩陵)		上円下方	Musashi Imperial Graveyard, Nagabusa, Hachiōji, Tokyo; 35°39′0.63″N 139°16′48.08″E	Stairs leading through a wooded area to a stone structure beyond a large torii.
124	Emperor Shōwa	January 7, 1989	Musashino no misasagi (武藏野陵)		上円下方	Musashi Imperial Graveyard, Nagabusa, Hachiōji, Tokyo; 35°39′3.94″N 139°16′53.37″E	Stairs leading through a wooded area to a stone structure beyond a large torii.
