= 511th =

511th may refer to:

- 511th Bombardment Squadron, inactive United States Air Force unit
- 511th Heavy Panzer Battalion, German World War II independent armoured battalion equipped with heavy tanks
- 511th Parachute Infantry Regiment (United States), unit of the United States Army first activated during World War II
- 511th Tactical Fighter Squadron, inactive United States Air Force unit

== See also ==
- 511 (number)
- 511 (disambiguation)
- 511, the year 511 (DXI) of the Julian calendar
- 511 BC
