= 511 (disambiguation) =

511 may refer to:

- The year 511 AD of the Common Era
- The year 511 BC before the Common Era
- The number 511 (number)
- The telephone number 5‒1‒1, used for transportation information in many regions of Canada and the United States of America
- 511 keV, the energy of each of the two photons created when a positron and an electron annihilate
- 5.11, an American apparel brand

== See also ==
- 511th (disambiguation)
- 51 (disambiguation)
