= 512 (disambiguation) =

512 may refer to:

- AD 512, a year in the 6th century AD
- 512 BC, a year in the 6th century BC
- 512 (number), a natural number
- Several Ferrari cars: the 512 S and 512 M racing cars, and the 512 BB and 512 BBi, 512 TR and F512 M road cars
- 512 Taurinensis, a minor planet orbiting the Sun
- The area code 512 (Austin, Texas area)
- 512th note, a musical note played for 1/512 of the duration of a whole note
- Site 512, US military radar site in Israel.
- Fiat 512, a passenger car

== See also ==
- 512th (disambiguation)
- 5-12 (disambiguation)
