= 549 BC =

549 BC in various calendars
- Gregorian calendar: 549 BC; DXLIX BC
- Ab urbe condita: 205
- Ancient Egypt era: XXVI dynasty, 116
- Pharaoh: Amasis II, 22
- Ancient Greek Olympiad (summer): 57th Olympiad, year 4
- Assyrian calendar: 4202
- Balinese saka calendar: N/A
- Bengali calendar: −1142 – −1141
- Berber calendar: 402
- Buddhist calendar: −4
- Burmese calendar: −1186
- Byzantine calendar: 4960–4961
- Chinese calendar: 辛亥年 (Metal Pig); 2149 or 1942 — to — 壬子年 (Water Rat); 2150 or 1943
- Coptic calendar: −832 – −831
- Discordian calendar: 618
- Ethiopian calendar: −556 – −555
- Hebrew calendar: 3212–3213
- Hindu calendars
- Vikram Samvat: −492 – −491
- Shaka Samvat: N/A
- Kali Yuga: 2552–2553
- Holocene calendar: 9452
- Iranian calendar: 1170 BP – 1169 BP
- Islamic calendar: 1206 BH – 1205 BH
- Javanese calendar: N/A
- Julian calendar: N/A
- Korean calendar: 1785
- Minguo calendar: 2460 before ROC 民前2460年
- Nanakshahi calendar: −2016
- Thai solar calendar: −6 – −5
- Tibetan calendar: ལྕགས་མོ་ཕག་ལོ་ (female Iron-Boar) −422 or −803 or −1575 — to — ཆུ་ཕོ་བྱི་བ་ལོ་ (male Water-Rat) −421 or −802 or −1574

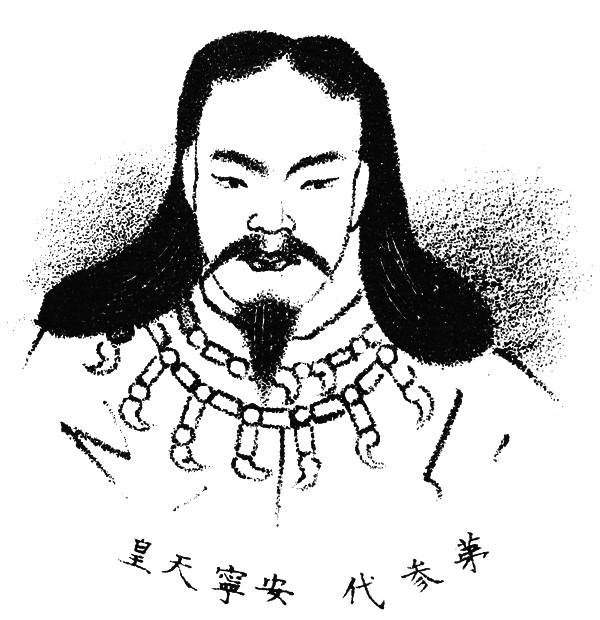
Emperor Annei (r. 549 - 511 BC)

The year 549 BC was a year of the pre-Julian Roman calendar. In the Roman Empire, it was known as year 205 Ab urbe condita. The denomination 549 BC for this year has been used since the early medieval period, when the Anno Domini calendar era became the prevalent method in Europe for naming years.

== Events ==
=== By place ===
==== Persia ====
- King Cyrus II (the Great) captures the Median capital of Ecbatana, conquering the nation of Media.

==== Asia ====
- Emperor Suizei dies after a 32-year reign and is succeeded by his son Annei as emperor of Japan.

== Births ==
- Darius I, king of Persia (approximate date)

== Deaths ==
- Suizei, emperor of Japan (b. 632 BC)
