= 512th =

512th may refer to:

- 512th Airlift Wing, an associate C-5 Galaxy Air Force Reserve unit located at Dover AFB, Delaware
- 512th Fighter Squadron, inactive United States Air Force unit
- 512th Operations Group, the operational flying component of the 512th Airlift Wing, assigned to the United States Air Force Reserve
- 512th Rescue Squadron (512 RQS), part of the 58th Special Operations Wing based at Kirtland Air Force Base, New Mexico
- 512th Heavy Panzerjäger Battalion, a German Army unit in World War II

== See also ==
- 512 (number)
- 512 (disambiguation)
- 512, the year 512 (DXII) of the Julian calendar
- 512 BC
