= Amonotoyototsu-hime =

Amonotoyototsu-hime 天豊津媛命

Empress consort of Japan
- Tenure: January 9, 509 BCE – 475 BCE

Empress dowager of Japan
- Tenure: appointed in 475
- Died: The 83rd year of Emperor Kōshō's reign (aged 114)
- Spouse: Emperor Itoku
- Issue: Emperor Kōshō; Tagishihiko no Mikoto
- Father: Okisomimi no Mikoto

Amonotoyototsu-hime (天豊津媛命) was empress consort of Emperor Itoku from January 9, 509 BCE to 475 BCE, later becoming empress dowager for her son, Emperor Kōshō.

== Life ==
Amonotoyototsu-hime was empress consort of Japan from January 9, 509 BCE to 475 BCE and was married to Emperor Itoku. She later became empress dowager following her husband's death in 475 BCE. Both the Kojiki and Nihon Shoki give very little information about her life, but it's believed she died at around 114 during the reign of her son, Emperor Kōshō. She was also the granddaughter of Emperor Annei.

== Notes ==
Japanese royalty
| Preceded by Nunasokonakatsu-hime | Empress consort of Japan; 509 BCE – 475 BCE | Succeeded by Yosotarashi-hime |
| Preceded by Nunasokonakatsu-hime | Empress dowager of Japan appointed in 475 BCE | Succeeded by Yosotarashi-hime |
