= Takatori Kokusai High School =

Takatori Kokusai High School 奈良県立高取国際高等学校

Location
- 455-2 Sata, Takatori-cho, Takaichi-gun, Nara-ken, Japan
- Coordinates: 34°27′27.2″N 135°47′32.2″E

Information
- School type: Public high school
- Established: 1984
- Sister school: Buyeo High School, Lycée Boissy d'Anglas, Shaker Heights High School, Beachwood High School
- Grades: 1–3
- Website: www.nps.ed.jp/takatori-kokusai-hs/index.html

Nara Prefectural Takatori Kokusai High School (奈良県立高取国際高等学校, Nara Kenritsu Takatori Kokusai Kōtōgakkō) is a co-educational public senior high school in Takaichi District, Nara, Japan.

The school provides three courses; English, International Communication, and a general course.

== Clubs ==
The school has 23 total clubs. There are 14 cultural clubs and 9 athletic clubs.

=== Cultural Clubs ===
- Brass band
- School newspaper
- School broadcasting
- Tea ceremony
- Flower arrangement
- Calligraphy
- Koto
- Fine arts
- Literary
- Drama
- English speaking society
- Volunteer
- Human rights thinking
- Karuta

=== Athletic Clubs ===
- Basketball
- Volleyball
- Soccer
- Tennis
- Table tennis
- Kendo
- Track and field
- Baseball
