= Oshihime =

Oshihime 押媛

Empress consort of Japan
- Tenure: 367 BC – 290 BC

Empress dowager of Japan
- Tenure: appointed in 290 BC
- Spouse: Emperor Kōan
- Issue: Prince Ōkibi no Morosusumi; Emperor Kōrei
- Father: Prince Amatarashikunioshihito

Oshihime (押媛; Also known as Oshika-hime-no-mikoto (忍鹿比売命) in the Kojiki) was empress consort of Japan, and later empress dowager from 367 BC to 290 BC and then 290 BC to an unknown date, respectively.

== Life ==
She was the daughter of Prince Amatarashikunioshihito and wife to Emperor Kōan, with whom she had two children. She was the Emperor's only wife, meaning he did not take concubines. Emperor Kōan belongs to a group of Emperors, starting with Emperor Suizei known as the Kesshi-hachidai (Eight generations lacking history). As such, there is little more than genealogy available for both him and his wife, Oshihime.

== Notes ==
Japanese royalty
Preceded by Yosotarashi-hime	Empress consort of Japan; 367–290 BC	Succeeded by Kuwashi-hime
Preceded by Yosotarashi-hime	Empress dowager of Japan appointed in 290 BC	Succeeded by Kuwashi-hime
