= 12/5 =

12/5 may refer to:

- December 5 in month/day date notation
- May 12 in day/month date notation
- 12 shillings and 5 pence in UK predecimal currency
- The dodecagram, Schläfli symbol 12/5

== See also ==
- 125 (disambiguation)
- 5/12 (disambiguation)
