= Yosotarashi-hime =

Yosotarashi-hime 世襲足媛

Empress consort of Japan
- Tenure: 447 – 392 BC

Empress dowager of Japan
- Tenure: appointed in 392 BC
- Spouse: Emperor Kōshō
- Issue: Emperor Kōan
- Father: Ame-no-Oshio-no-Mikoto or Okitsuyoso

Yosotarashi-hime (世襲足媛) was empress consort of Japan from 447 to 392 BC, and then empress dowager from 392 respectively.

== Life ==
She was the wife of Emperor Kōshō. From this union bore many children, including Emperor Kōan. Her father changes between the Kojiki, and Nihon Shoki, with her brother in the Kojiki, Okitsuyoso, being listed as her father in the Nihon-Shoki. Little information exists about her. Her husband belongs to a group of Emperor's known as "Kesshi-hachidai" or "eight generations lacking history". As such there is little information about her and her husband.

== Notes ==
Japanese royalty
Preceded by Amonotoyototsu-hime	Empress consort of Japan; 447–392 BC	Succeeded by Oshihime
Preceded by Amonotoyototsu-hime	Empress dowager of Japan appointed in 392 BC	Succeeded by Oshihime
