= Ōmi no Mifune =

- 淡海三船
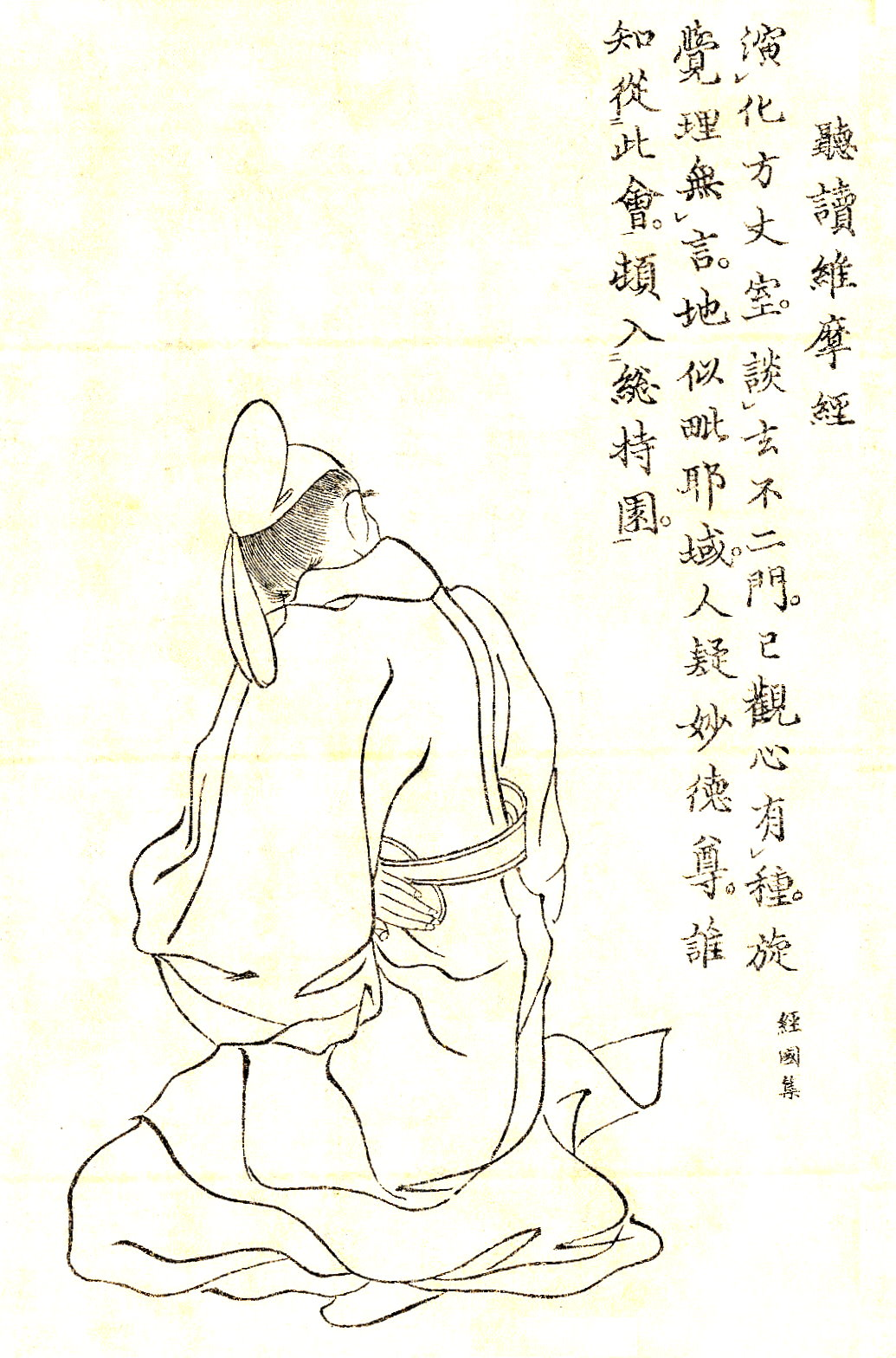
- Ōmi no Mifune by Kikuchi Yōsai, illustration in the late Edo work Zenken Kojitsu (前賢故実).
- Born: 722
- Died: July 17, 785
- Relatives: Emperor Kōbun (paternal great-grandfather), Prince Kadono (葛野王, Kadono no Ōkimi; paternal grandfather), Prince Ikebe (池辺王, Ikebe no Ōkimi; father)
- Writing career
- Language: Classical Chinese
- Period: Nara
- Genre: kanshi

Ōmi no Mifune (淡海三船; 722—785) was a Japanese scholar and writer of kanshi (poetry in Classical Chinese) and kanbun (prose in Classical Chinese), who lived in the Nara period of Japanese history.

== Biography ==
=== Birth and ancestry ===
Mifune was born in 722.

His father was Prince Ikebe (池辺王, Ikebe no Ōkimi), who was a son of Prince Kadono (葛野王, Kadono no Ōkimi), a son of Emperor Kōbun. He was originally an imperial prince, known as Prince Mifune (御船王 or 三船王, Mifune no Ōkimi), but in the first month of 751 was made a commoner and given the surname Ōmi and the title Mahito.

=== Political career ===
He served as Head of the University (大学頭, daigaku no kami), Professor of Letters (文章博士, monjō hakase) and Steward of the Prosecution Bureau (刑部大輔, gyōbu no taifu).

=== Death ===
He died in 785.

== Literary career ==
In 770 he composed the work Tō Daiwajō Tōseiden (唐大和上東征伝), an account of the Chinese monk Jianzhen's work in Japan.

It has been theorized that he was the compiler of the oldest extant Japanese collection of kanshi, the Kaifūsō.

Some of his poetry was included in the kanshi anthology Keikokushū.

== Scholarship ==
Mifune is credited with determining the canonical Chinese style posthumous names of early emperors who did not have them before his time (they only had Japanese style posthumous names). Between 762 and 764 he set the names of Emperor Jinmu, Emperor Suizei, Emperor Annei and so on.

Based on his research into Buddhist scriptures, in 779 he declared the Shakuma Kaen Ron (釈摩訶衍論), a commentary on the Awakening of Faith in the Mahāyāna attributed to Nāgārjuna (龍樹, Ryūju), to be a forgery.
