= Nunasokonakatsu-hime =

Empress consort and empress dowager of Japan

Empress consort of Japan
- Tenure: 546–510 BC

Empress dowager of Japan
- Tenure: appointed in 510 BC
- Spouse: Emperor Annei
- Issue: Tokotsuhikoirone; Emperor Itoku; Ikisomimi no mikoto; Shikitsuhiko
- Father: Kamo no Okimi
- Mother: Mirahime

Nunasokonakatsu-hime (渟名底仲媛命) was the legendary empress consort of Japan from 546 to 510 BC and then empress dowager from 510 BC according to traditional dates.

== Life ==
There exact number of her children differs between the Kojiki and Nihon Shoki. In the Kojiki she and her husband have 3, Tokotsuhikoirone, Emperor Itoku, and Shikitsuhiko. Yet in the Nihon Shoki they have another, Ikisomimi. only the Kojiki states her father as Kamo no Okimi. The Empress's life is not recorded in the Kojiki or Nihon Shoki but for her family and titles.

== Notes ==
Japanese royalty
Preceded by Isuzuyori-hime	Empress consort of Japan; 546–510 BC	Succeeded by Amonotoyototsu-hime
Preceded by Isuzuyori-hime	Empress dowager of Japan appointed in 510 BC	Succeeded by Amonotoyototsu-hime
