= 511 BC =

511 BC in various calendars
Gregorian calendar	511 BC; DXI BC
Ab urbe condita	243
Ancient Egypt era	XXVII dynasty, 15
Pharaoh	Darius I of Persia, 11
Ancient Greek Olympiad (summer)	67th Olympiad, year 2
Assyrian calendar	4240
Balinese saka calendar	N/A
Bengali calendar	−1104 – −1103
Berber calendar	440
Buddhist calendar	34
Burmese calendar	−1148
Byzantine calendar	4998–4999
Chinese calendar	己丑年 (Earth Ox); 2187 or 1980 — to — 庚寅年 (Metal Tiger); 2188 or 1981
Coptic calendar	−794 – −793
Discordian calendar	656
Ethiopian calendar	−518 – −517
Hebrew calendar	3250–3251
- Hindu calendars
Vikram Samvat	−454 – −453
Shaka Samvat	N/A
Kali Yuga	2590–2591
Holocene calendar	9490
Iranian calendar	1132 BP – 1131 BP
Islamic calendar	1167 BH – 1166 BH
Javanese calendar	N/A
Julian calendar	N/A
Korean calendar	1823
Minguo calendar	2422 before ROC 民前2422年
Nanakshahi calendar	−1978
Thai solar calendar	32–33
Tibetan calendar	ས་མོ་གླང་ལོ་ (female Earth-Ox) −384 or −765 or −1537 — to — ལྕགས་ཕོ་སྟག་ལོ་ (male Iron-Tiger) −383 or −764 or −1536

== Events ==
- The Greek tragic poet Phrynicus wins his first theatrical contest in Athens.

== Deaths ==
- Emperor Annei of Japan, according to legend.
