= 125 =

125 may refer to:

- 125 (number), the natural number following 124 and preceding 126
- AD 125, a year in the 2nd century AD
- 125 BC, a year in the 2nd century BC
- 125 (dinghy), a two person intermediate sailing dinghy
- 125 (New Jersey bus), a New Jersey Transit bus route
- 125 Liberatrix, a main-belt asteroid
- Ferrari 125 F1, a Formula One racing car
- Ferrari 125 S, a sports car
- Fiat 125, a large family car
- Škoda 125, a compact sedan
- InterCity 125, a railway train

== See also ==
- 125th (disambiguation)
- 12/5 (disambiguation)
- Unbipentium, a hypothetical chemical element with atomic number 125
