= Emperor Kōan =

Legendary emperor of Japan

Emperor Kōan 孝安天皇
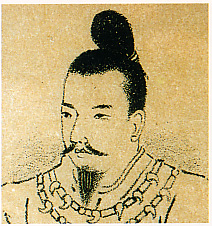

Emperor of Japan
- Reign: 393 BC – 291 BC (traditional)
- Predecessor: Kōshō
- Successor: Kōrei
- Born: 427 BC
- Died: 291 BC (aged 137)
- Burial: Tamate no oka no e no misasagi (玉手丘上陵) (Gose)
- Spouse: Oshihime
- Issue: Ōkibinomorosusumi-no-Mikoto; Emperor Kōrei
Posthumous name
- Chinese-style shigō: Emperor Kōan (孝安天皇) Japanese-style shigō: Yamato-tarashihiko-kuni-oshihito no Sumeramikoto (日本足彦国押人天皇)
- House: Imperial House of Japan
- Father: Emperor Kōshō
- Mother: Yosotarashi-hime
- Religion: Shinto

Emperor Kōan (孝安天皇, Kōan-tennō), also known as Yamatotarashihikokunioshihito no Mikoto (大倭帯日子国押人命) was the sixth legendary emperor of Japan, according to the traditional order of succession. Very little is known about this Emperor due to a lack of material available for further verification and study. Kōan is known as a "legendary emperor" among historians as his actual existence is disputed. Nothing exists in the Kojiki other than his name and genealogy. Kōan's reign allegedly began in 393 BC, he had one wife and two sons and reigned for more than 100 years until his death in 291 BC at the age of 137. One of his sons then supposedly became the next emperor. Emperor Kōan is traditionally accepted as the final emperor of the Jōmon period, which ended in 300 BC.

== Legendary narrative ==
In the Kojiki and Nihon Shoki, only his name and genealogy were recorded. The Japanese have traditionally accepted this sovereign's historical existence, and an Imperial misasagi or tomb for Kōan is currently maintained; however, no extant contemporary records have been discovered that confirm a view that this historical figure actually reigned. He is believed to be son of Emperor Kōshō; and his mother is believed to have been Yosotarashi-no-hime, who was the daughter of Okitsuyoso, and ancestress of the Owari. The Kojiki records Kōan was the second son of Emperor Kōshō, and that he ruled from the palace of Akitsushima-no-miya (葛城室之秋津島宮; and in the Nihon Shoki as 室秋津島宮) at Muro in what would come to be known as Yamato Province. Kōan was allegedly an emperor who reigned for more than a hundred years, and lived to the age of 137 (according to the Kojiki). He allegedly had a wife named Yosotarashi-hime, and fathered two children with her. Kōan's reign lasted from 392 BC until his death in 291 BC, one of his sons then took the throne and would later be referred to as Emperor Kōrei.

== Known information ==
The existence of at least the first nine Emperors is disputed due to insufficient material available for further verification and study. Kōan is thus regarded by historians as a "legendary Emperor", and is considered to have been the fifth of eight Emperors without specific legends associated with them. (Note: Also known as the "eight undocumented monarchs" (欠史八代, Kesshi-hachidai).) The name Kōan-tennō was assigned to him posthumously by later generations. His name might have been regularized centuries after the lifetime ascribed to Kōan, possibly during the time in which legends about the origins of the imperial dynasty were compiled as the chronicles known today as the Kojiki. The name "Kōan" is first credited to Japanese scholar and writer Ōmi no Mifune, who allegedly came up with the name sometime in the latter half of the 8th century.

Emperor Kōan's longevity is disputed as the oldest verified humans usually go into the mid to late 110s. While historian John S. Brownlee calls Kōan's alleged age of 137 at the time of his death "too long", he also says that this is not unusual for mythical figures. He ends his narrative by saying that nobody in Japan was bothered by the longevity of the former emperors until the modern era. Regardless of his age, the actual site of Kōan's grave is not known. Kōan is traditionally venerated at a memorial Shinto shrine (misasagi) in Tamade, Gose. The Imperial Household Agency designates this location as Kōan's mausoleum, and its formal name is Tamate no oka no e no misasagi.

The first emperor that historians state might have actually existed is Emperor Sujin, the 10th emperor of Japan. Outside of the Kojiki, the reign of Emperor Kinmei (Note: The 29th Emperor) (c. 509 – 571 AD) is the first for which contemporary historiography is able to assign verifiable dates. The conventionally accepted names and dates of the early Emperors were not confirmed as "traditional" though, until the reign of Emperor Kanmu (Note: Kanmu was the 50th sovereign of the imperial dynasty) between 737 and 806 AD.

== Consorts and children ==
- Empress: Oshi-hime (押媛), Prince Amatarashikunioshihito's daughter (Emperor Kōshō's son)
  - Prince Ōkibi no Morosusumi (大吉備諸進命)
  - Prince Ōyamatonekohikofutoni (大日本根子彦太瓊尊), later Emperor Kōrei

== See also ==
- Emperor of Japan
- List of Emperors of Japan
- Imperial cult

== Notes ==
Regnal titles
Preceded by Emperor Kōshō	Legendary Emperor of Japan; 393 BC – 291 BC (traditional dates)	Succeeded by Emperor Kōrei
