= 512 (number) =

| ← 511 | 512 | 513 → |
- List of numbers; Integers; ← 0 100 200 300 400 500 600 700 800 900 →
- Cardinal: five hundred twelve
- Ordinal: 512th (five hundred twelfth)
- Factorization: 2^{9}
- Greek numeral: ΦΙΒ´
- Roman numeral: DXII, dxii
- Binary: 1000000000_{2}
- Ternary: 200222_{3}
- Senary: 2212_{6}
- Octal: 1000_{8}
- Duodecimal: 368_{12}
- Hexadecimal: 200_{16}

512 (five hundred [and] twelve) is the natural number following 511 and preceding 513.

== In mathematics ==
- 512 is a power of two: 2^{9} (2 to the 9th power) and the cube of 8: 8^{3}.
- It is the eleventh Leyland number.
- It is also the third Dudeney number.
- It is a self number in base 12.
- It is a Harshad number in decimal.
- It is the cube of the sum of its digits in base 10.
- It is the number of directed graphs on 3 labeled nodes.
- It is palindromic in bases 7 (1331_{7}) and 15 (242_{15}).
- It is a vertically symmetric number. (sequence A053701 in the OEIS)

== In computing ==
512 bytes is a common disk sector size, and exactly a half of kibibyte.

Internet Relay Chat restricts the size of a message to 510 bytes, which fits to 512-bytes buffers when coupled with the message-separating CRLF sequence.

512 = 2·256 is the highest number of glyphs that the VGA character generator can use simultaneously.

== In music ==
Selena Quintanilla released a song titled El Chico del Apartamento 512 (the title referring to area code 512, which serves Austin, Texas), in 1995.

Lamb of God recorded a song titled "512" for their 2015 album VII: Sturm und Drang. The song was named after the cell number in the Pankrác Prison Randy Blythe was in during his manslaughter case.

Mora and Jhay Cortez recorded a song titled "512" (The number 512 in this song refers to the Percocet 512 pill, a white, round pill whose active substances are acetaminophen and oxycodone hydrochloride) in February of 2021.

== In popular culture ==
512 is a recurring number in the 2022 videogame Signalis.

In the 2022 videogame Who's Lila?, there is a prominent song named "Forest of 512 Sycamores".
