= Isuzuyori-hime =

Japanese Empress

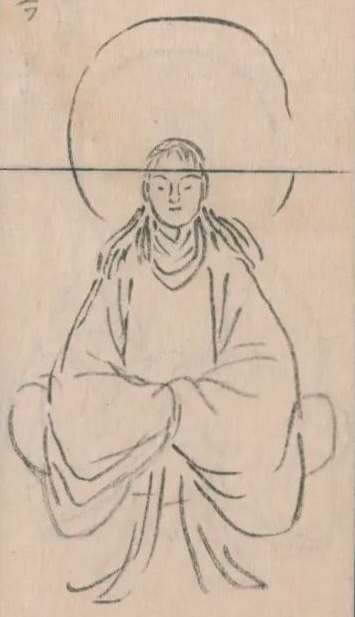

Empress consort of Japan
- Tenure: 580–548 BC

Empress dowager of Japan
- Tenure: appointed in 548 BC
- Spouse: Emperor Suizei
- Issue: Emperor Annei
- Father: Kotoshironushi
- Religion: Shinto

Isuzuyori-hime (Japanese: 五十鈴依媛) was the legendary empress consort of Japan as the wife of Emperor Suizei, the second legendary emperor of Japan. She was the mother of Emperor Annei. According to historical records, she is regarded as the ancestor goddess of the Masters of Shiki.

== Life ==
In the second year, during the spring season of Suizei's reign, she was appointed empress. Later on, in the first year, on the 10th month, 11th day of her son Emperor Annei's reign, he bestowed upon her the title of Kodaigo (empress dowager). It is said that she was born as the daughter of the deity Kotoshironushi, and the sister of Himetataraisuzu-hime, who was the first empress of Japan, and the first wife of Emperor Jimmu. She was an important mythological figure in the Nihon Shoki (Chronicles of Japan).

== Notes ==
Japanese royalty
Preceded by Himetataraisuzu-hime	Empress consort of Japan; 580–548 BC	Succeeded by Nunasokonakatsu-hime
Preceded by Himetataraisuzu-hime	Empress dowager of Japan appointed in 548 BC	Succeeded by Nunasokonakatsu-hime
