= 5-12 =

5-12, 5/12, or 5.12 may refer to:

- May 12 (month-day date notation)
- 5 December (day-month date notation)

== See also ==
- 512 (disambiguation)
- 12 May Karachi violence in Pakistan, which took the lives of approximately 30 people
- 2008 Sichuan earthquake in China, which took the lives of over 68,000 people and displaced over 1 million
