= Manuel Mora (musician) =

American musician

Manuel Chavez Mora. Born in Zelzah, California, 1919. Died in Los Angeles, California, 2001.

== Biography and historical context ==
Meño Mora was born in the San Fernando Valley in 1919 to Francisco Mora, of Michoacán, Mexico, and Maria de Jesús Chávez, of San Luis Potosí, Mexico. In the early 20th Century, rural areas and urban barrios developed into centers for Mexican immigrant and Mexican American communities. Steven Loza writes that the corrido (ballad) became a means by which immigrants expressed their concerns and that Spanish-language radio and recording industries began to flourish. In this way, Mexican music became a means of inscribing Mexican culture into the Californian landscape. This was the first rearticulation of the Mexican in California since the EuroAmericans had established cultural dominance in the state following the gold rush and the establishment of the railroads in the 1870s.

Prior to 1929, growers and industrialists collaborated with the Department of State, the Department of Agriculture, and the Department of the Interior to allow for a surplus of Mexican migrant workers. Mora's parents were among these workers who "benefited" from this legal free flow of labor and came to California to work on the railroads. Mora grew up in a decidedly Mexican environment, speaking Spanish, traveling to and from Mexico to visit family, and accompanying his mother's singing on the guitar.

At an early age, Mora began performing with various musical ensembles. Though he worked many day jobs as a late teen and young adult, he dedicated all of his free time to rigorous practice and touring. He married Eleanor (Noi) Moreno Rico and with her had a son, Manuel Rico Mora Jr. They later divorced and he then married Theresa Bravo, with whom he had two children, Hugo and Theresa Mora.

== Musical career ==
Mora formed, co-owned, and managed "Trio America", for which he sang and played guitar. Trio America toured throughout California during the mid 20th century, playing corridos and rancheras, mostly for campesinos and their families working in the central Californian agricultural industry. Additionally, during this time, Mora began recording for a variety of Mexican music record companies. Soon, Mora and his Trio America became increasingly popular in the Los Angeles Mexican music circuit, partially due to their collaboration with the Grammy Award-winning Mariachi Los Camperos. Later in his career, Mora recorded with Crown Records as the guitar soloist on an album entitled Classical Mexican Folk Music. Recordings for this album were featured on eight releases and sold worldwide except in Cuba and the USSR.

== Radio ==
Mora was an active member of AFTRA for thirty years. He was a Disc Jockey for ten years at KBLA in Burbank, California, for fifteen at KRHM (now 102.7 KIIS FM), and was the only Mexican American regularly featured on The Steve Allen Show. At KRHM he pioneered Spanish language music programming, thus incorporating his desire to promote Hispanic musicians and their artistic endeavors into his music and radio career.

== The Million-Dollar Theater and management ==
Mora was the manager and Master of Ceremonies at the Million Dollar Theater in Los Angeles California for ten years. While at the Million Dollar Theater, he promoted and collaborated with famous Mexican artists such as Pedro Armendáriz, José Alfredo Jiménez, María Félix, Lola Beltrán, Gerardo Reyes, Cantinflas, Agustín Lara, Irma Serrano, Pedro Vargas, Pedro Infante, and Tin Tan. Furthermore, he worked for the Immigration Department and owned a promotional touring agency, lobbying so that Mexican and Latin American musicians and boxers could enter the U.S. legally.

== Film ==
Mora costarred and played guitar in more than fourteen films produced in Mexico, including Mojado Power, with Alfonso Arau and Blanca Guerra, and Rio de Oro, with Rosa Gloria Chagoyán and Andrés García. In contrast to the other films he performed in, La Quebradita and Jaula de Oro were filmed in the San Fernando Valley, California.

== Awards ==
Mora is a recipient of the Los Angeles Mayor's Certificate of Appreciation for Meritorious Community Service
