= Emperor Itoku =

Legendary emperor of Japan

Emperor Itoku 懿徳天皇
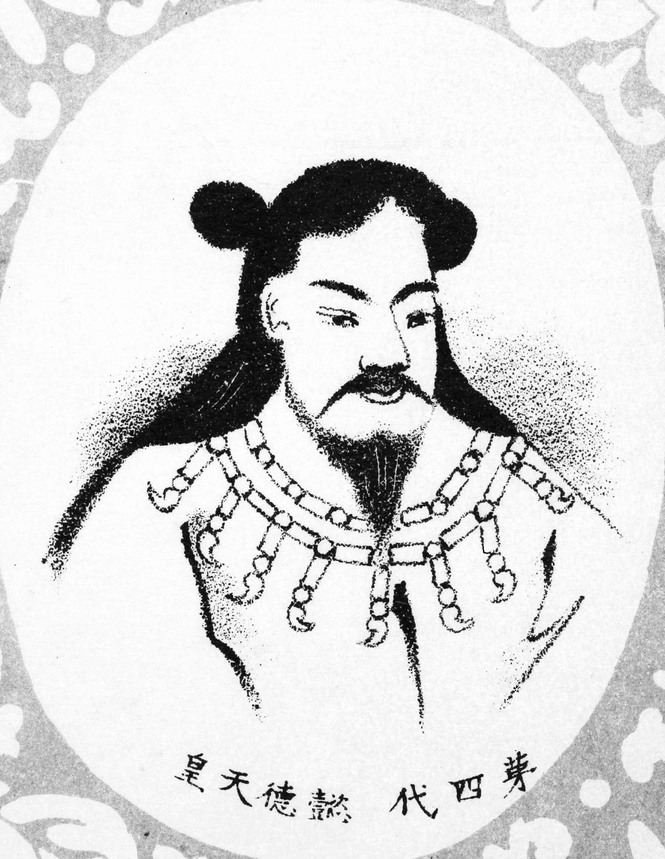

Emperor of Japan
- Reign: 510 BC – 477 BC (traditional)
- Predecessor: Annei
- Successor: Kōshō
- Born: 553 BC
- Died: 477 BC (aged 76)
- Burial: Unebi-yama no minami no Manago no tani no e no misasagi (畝傍山南纖沙溪上陵) (Kashihara)
- Spouse: Amonotoyototsu-hime
- Issue: Emperor Kōshō; Takeshihikokushitomose-no-Mikoto
Posthumous name
- Chinese-style shigō: Emperor Itoku (懿徳天皇) Japanese-style shigō: Ōyamatohikosukitomo no Sumeramikoto (大日本彦耜友天皇)
- House: Imperial House of Japan
- Father: Emperor Annei
- Mother: Nunasokonakatsu-hime
- Religion: Shinto

Emperor Itoku (懿徳天皇, Itoku-tennō), also known as Ōyamatohikosukitomo no Mikoto (大倭日子鉏友命) was the fourth legendary Emperor of Japan, according to the traditional order of succession. Very little is known about this emperor due to a lack of material available for further verification and study. Itoku is known as a "legendary emperor" among historians as his actual existence is disputed. Nothing exists in the Kojiki other than his name and genealogy. Itoku's reign allegedly began in 510 BC, he had one wife and two sons. After his death in 477 BC, his first son supposedly became the next emperor.

== Legendary narrative ==
In the Kojiki and Nihon Shoki, only Itoku's name and genealogy were recorded. While the Japanese have traditionally accepted this sovereign's historical existence, no extant contemporary records have been discovered that confirm a view that this historical figure actually reigned. Itoku is believed to be the son of Emperor Annei, and his mother is believed to have been Nunasokonakatsu-hime. The latter of the two is allegedly the granddaughter of Kotoshironushi. The Kojiki records that Itoku was the second or third son of Emperor Annei, but the surviving documents provide no basis for speculating why the elder brother or brothers were passed over for the throne. He is traditionally believed to have ruled from the palace of Migario-no-miya (軽之境岡宮; and in the Nihon Shoki as 軽曲峡宮) at Karu in what would come to be known as Yamato Province. At some point he married a woman named Amonotoyototsu-hime, and fathered two sons with her. Itoku's reign lasted from 510 BC until his death in 477 BC, his son then took the throne and would later be referred to as Emperor Kōshō.

== Known information ==
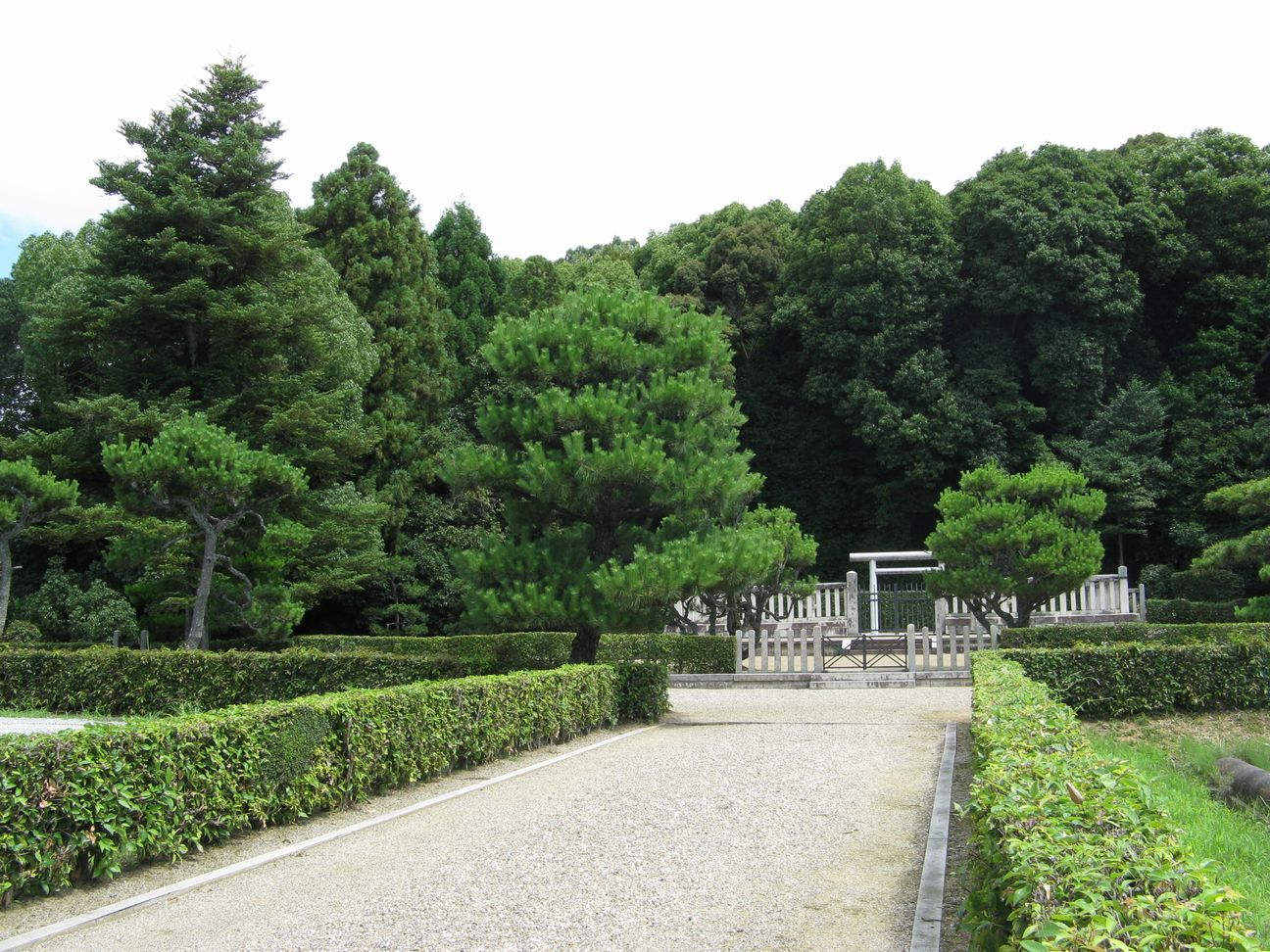
Memorial Shinto shrine and mausoleum honoring Emperor Itoku.

The existence of at least the first nine Emperors is disputed due to insufficient material available for further verification and study. Itoku is thus regarded by historians as a "legendary Emperor", and is considered to have been the third of eight Emperors without specific legends associated with them. (Note: Also known as the "eight undocumented monarchs" (欠史八代, Kesshi-hachidai).) The name Itoku-tennō was assigned to him posthumously by later generations, and literally means "benign virtue". His name might have been regularized centuries after the lifetime ascribed to Itoku, possibly during the time in which legends about the origins of the imperial dynasty were compiled as the chronicles known today as the Kojiki. While the actual site of Itoku's grave is not known, the Emperor is traditionally venerated at a memorial Shinto shrine (misasagi) in Kashihara. The Imperial Household Agency designates this location as Itoku's mausoleum. It is formally named Unebi-yama no hitsujisaru Mihodo no i no e no misasagi. The first emperor that historians state might have actually existed is Emperor Sujin, the 10th emperor of Japan. Outside of the Kojiki, the reign of Emperor Kinmei (Note: The 29th Emperor) (c. 509 – 571 AD) is the first for which contemporary historiography is able to assign verifiable dates. The conventionally accepted names and dates of the early Emperors were not confirmed as "traditional" though, until the reign of Emperor Kanmu (Note: Kanmu was the 50th sovereign of the imperial dynasty) between 737 and 806 AD.

== Consort and children ==
- Empress: Amonotoyototsu-hime (天豊津媛命), Prince Okimi's daughter (Emperor Annei's son)
  - Prince Mimatsuhikokaeshine (観松彦香殖稲尊), later Emperor Kōshō
  - Prince Takeshihikokushitomose (武石彦奇友背命)

== See also ==
- Emperor of Japan
- List of Emperors of Japan
- Imperial cult

== Notes ==
Regnal titles
Preceded by Emperor Annei	Legendary Emperor of Japan; 510 BC – 477 BC (traditional dates)	Succeeded by Emperor Kōshō
