= Emperor Kōshō =

Legendary emperor of Japan

Emperor Kōshō 孝昭天皇
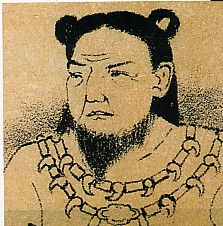

Emperor of Japan
- Reign: 475 BC – 393 BC (traditional)
- Predecessor: Itoku
- Successor: Kōan
- Born: 501 BC
- Died: 393 BC (aged 108)
- Burial: Waki-no-kami no Hakata no yama no e no misasagi (掖上博多山上陵) (Gose)
- Spouse: Yosotarashi-hime
- Issue: Ametarashihikokunioshihito-no-Mikoto; Emperor Kōan
Posthumous name
- Chinese-style shigō: Emperor Kōshō (孝昭天皇) Japanese-style shigō: Mimatsuhikokaeshine no Sumeramikoto (観松彦香殖稲天皇)
- House: Imperial House of Japan
- Father: Emperor Itoku
- Mother: Amonotoyototsu-hime
- Religion: Shinto

Emperor Kōshō (孝昭天皇, Kōshō-tennō), also known as Mimatsuhikokaeshine no Mikoto (真津日子訶恵志泥命) was the fifth legendary emperor of Japan, according to the traditional order of succession. Very little is known about this Emperor due to a lack of material available for further verification and study. Kōshō is known as a "legendary emperor" among historians as his actual existence is disputed. Nothing exists in the Kojiki other than his name and genealogy. Kōshō's reign allegedly began in 475 BC, he had one wife and two sons. After his death in 393 BC, his second son supposedly became the next emperor.

== Legendary narrative ==
In the Kojiki and Nihon Shoki, only his name and genealogy were recorded. The Japanese have traditionally accepted this sovereign's historical existence, and an Imperial misasagi(陵) or tomb for Kōshō is currently maintained; however, no extant contemporary records have been discovered that confirm a view that this historical figure actually reigned. Kōshō is believed to be the oldest son of Emperor Itoku, and his wife Amanotoyototsu-hime. His mother was the daughter of Okishimimi-no-kami. The Kojiki records that he ruled from the palace of Ikekokoro-no-miya (葛城掖上宮; and in the Nihon Shoki as 掖上池心宮) at Waki-no-kami in what would come to be known as Yamato Province. Kōshō allegedly had a wife named Yosotarashi-hime, and fathered two children with her. His reign lasted from 475 BC until his death in 393 BC, his second son then took the throne and would later be referred to as Emperor Kōan.

== Known information ==
The existence of at least the first nine Emperors is disputed due to insufficient material available for further verification and study. Kōshō is thus regarded by historians as a "legendary Emperor", and is considered to have been the fourth of eight Emperors without specific legends associated with them. (Note: Also known as the "eight undocumented monarchs" (欠史八代, Kesshi-hachidai).) The name Kōshō-tennō was assigned to him posthumously by later generations, and literally means "filial manifestation". His name might have been regularized centuries after the lifetime ascribed to Kōshō, possibly during the time in which legends about the origins of the imperial dynasty were compiled as the chronicles known today as the Kojiki. While the actual site of Kōshō's grave is not known, the Emperor is traditionally venerated at a memorial Shinto shrine (misasagi) in Gose. The Imperial Household Agency designates this location as Kōshō's mausoleum. It is formally named Waki-no-kami no Hakata no yama no e no misasagi. There is a possibility that this figure could have lived instead in the 1st century (AD), however more research is needed to make any further conclusions.

The first emperor that historians state might have actually existed is Emperor Sujin, the 10th emperor of Japan. Outside of the Kojiki, the reign of Emperor Kinmei (Note: The 29th Emperor) (c. 509 – 571 AD) is the first for which contemporary historiography is able to assign verifiable dates. The conventionally accepted names and dates of the early Emperors were not confirmed as "traditional" though, until the reign of Emperor Kanmu (Note: Kanmu was the 50th sovereign of the imperial dynasty) between 737 and 806 AD.

== Consorts and Children ==
- Empress: Yosotarashi-hime (世襲足媛), Owari clan's daughter
  - Prince Ametarashihikokunioshihito (天足彦国押人命)
  - Prince Yamatotarashihikokunioshihito (日本足彦国押人尊), later Emperor Kōan

== See also ==
- Emperor of Japan
- List of Emperors of Japan
- Imperial cult

== Notes ==
Regnal titles
Preceded by Emperor Itoku	Legendary Emperor of Japan; 475 BC – 393 BC (traditional dates)	Succeeded by Emperor Kōan
