= Takaichi District, Nara =

District in Nara prefecture, Japan

Coordinates: 34.4497°N 135.809°E

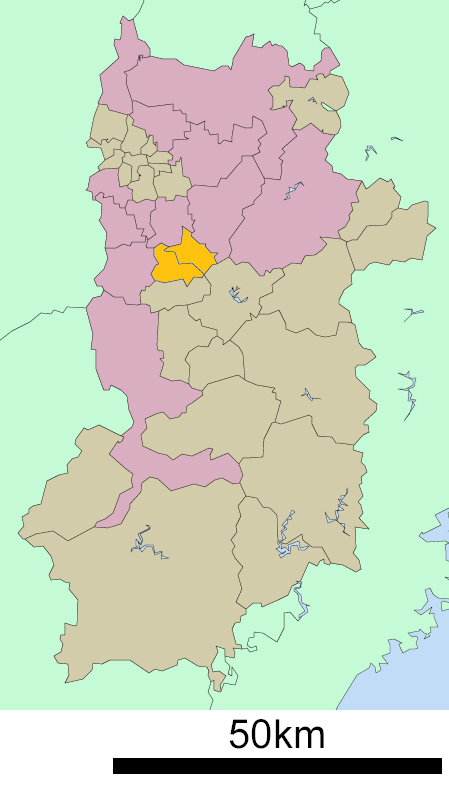
Location of Takaichi District in Nara Prefecture

Takaichi (高市郡, Takaichi-gun) is a district located in Nara Prefecture, Japan.
