= 511 =

Calendar year

511 in various calendars
- Gregorian calendar: 511; DXI
- Ab urbe condita: 1264
- Assyrian calendar: 5261
- Balinese saka calendar: 432–433
- Bengali calendar: −83 – −82
- Berber calendar: 1461
- Buddhist calendar: 1055
- Burmese calendar: −127
- Byzantine calendar: 6019–6020
- Chinese calendar: 庚寅年 (Metal Tiger); 3208 or 3001 — to — 辛卯年 (Metal Rabbit); 3209 or 3002
- Coptic calendar: 227–228
- Discordian calendar: 1677
- Ethiopian calendar: 503–504
- Hebrew calendar: 4271–4272
- Hindu calendars
- Vikram Samvat: 567–568
- Shaka Samvat: 432–433
- Kali Yuga: 3611–3612
- Holocene calendar: 10511
- Iranian calendar: 111 BP – 110 BP
- Islamic calendar: 114 BH – 113 BH
- Javanese calendar: 397–398
- Julian calendar: 511; DXI
- Korean calendar: 2844
- Minguo calendar: 1401 before ROC 民前1401年
- Nanakshahi calendar: −957
- Seleucid era: 822/823 AG
- Thai solar calendar: 1053–1054
- Tibetan calendar: ལྕགས་ཕོ་སྟག་ལོ་ (male Iron-Tiger); 637 or 256 or −516 — to — ལྕགས་མོ་ཡོས་ལོ་ (female Iron-Hare); 638 or 257 or −515

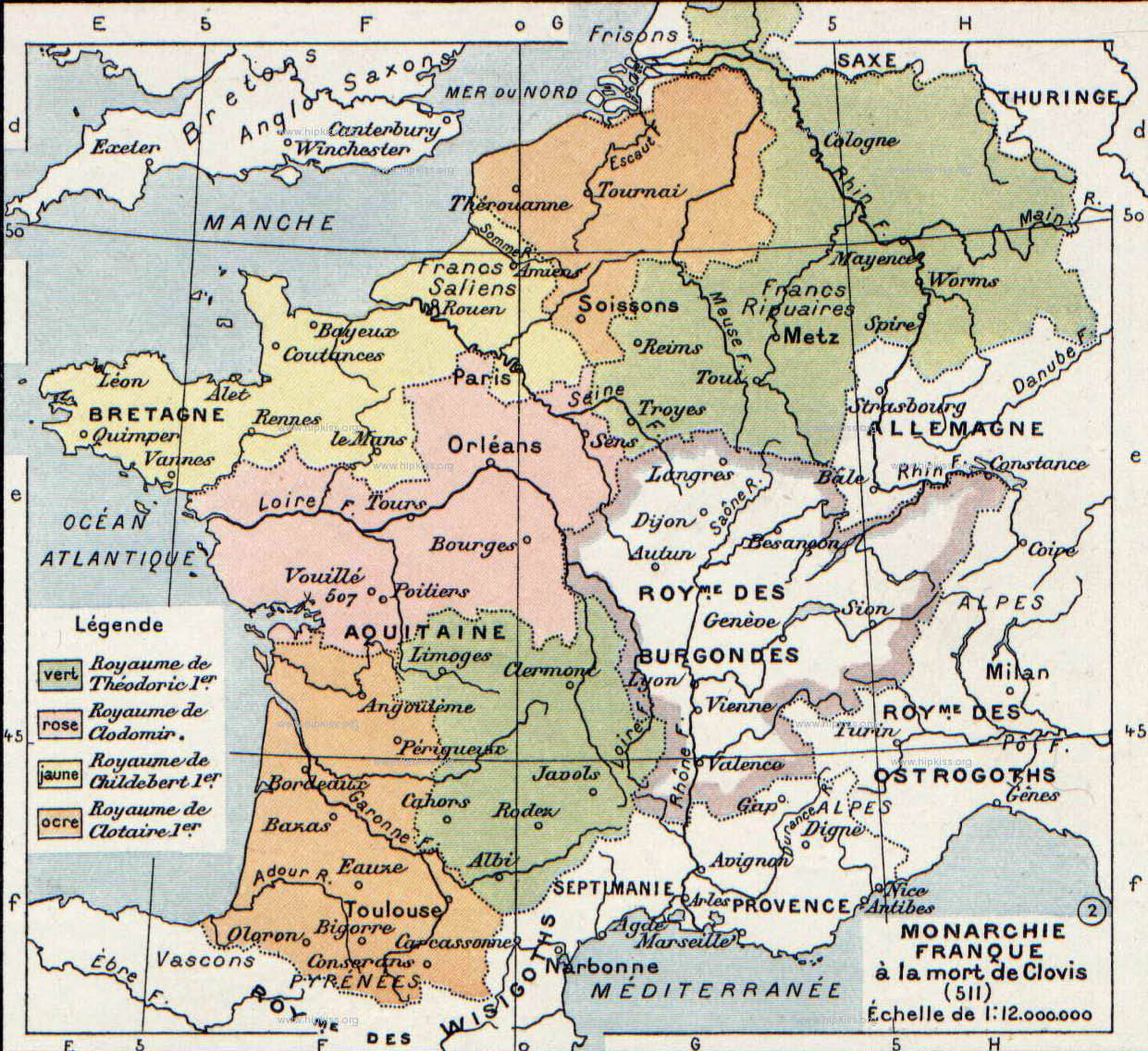
The Frankish Kingdom after Clovis' death (511)

Year 511 (DXI) was a common year starting on Saturday of the Julian calendar. At the time, it was known as the Year of the Consulship of Felix and Secundinus (or, less frequently, year 1264 Ab urbe condita). The denomination 511 for this year has been used since the early medieval period, when the Anno Domini calendar era became the prevalent method in Europe for naming years.

== Events ==
=== By place ===
==== Byzantine Empire ====
- Riots erupt in the streets of Antioch, between supporters of Patriarch Flavian II and Emperor Anastasius I, in sympathy with Non-Chalcedonianism.

==== Europe ====
- November 27 – King Clovis I dies at Paris (Lutetia) at age 45, and is buried in the Abbey of St. Genevieve. The Merovingian dynasty is continued by his four sons (Theuderic I, Chlodomer, Childebert I and Chlothar I), who divide the Frankish Kingdom and rule from the capitals at Metz, Orléans, Paris and Soissons, respectively.
- Ostrogothic King Theodoric the Great assumes the regency over Amalaric, his grandson and future king of the Visigothic Kingdom - Theodoric now rules over territory stretching from the Atlantic Ocean to the Adriatic Sea.

=== By topic ===
==== Inventions ====
- Aryabhata, Indian astronomer and mathematician, comes up with concepts of mathematical equations, one of which explains the rotation of the Earth on its axis. This concept is far ahead of its time and he is fairly accurate in his description of it. He also comes up with a lot of other ideas about the Solar System, but many of them are flawed because he considers the Earth to be the center of the universe. Aryabhata is often given credit for coming up with the number zero and using it as a placeholder.

==== Religion ====
- First Council of Orléans: Clovis I convenes a synod of Gallic bishops to reform the Church, and create a link between the Crown and the Catholic episcopate.
- Macedonius II is deposed as patriarch of Constantinople, and replaced by Timothy I.
- The convent of Saint-Césaire is built in Arles.

== Births ==
- Yang Yin, official of Northern Qi (d. 560)

== Deaths ==
- November 27 – Clovis I, king of the Franks
- Gesalic, king of the Visigoths
