= 511 (number) =

← 510	511	512 →
- List of numbers; Integers; ← 0 100 200 300 400 500 600 700 800 900 →
- Cardinal: five hundred eleven
- Ordinal: 511th (five hundred eleventh)
- Factorization: 7 × 73
- Greek numeral: ΦΙΑ´
- Roman numeral: DXI, dxi
- Binary: 111111111_{2}
- Ternary: 200221_{3}
- Senary: 2211_{6}
- Octal: 777_{8}
- Duodecimal: 367_{12}
- Hexadecimal: 1FF_{16}

511 is the natural number following 510 and preceding 512.

== In mathematics ==
It is a Mersenne number, being one less than a power of 2: $511=2^9-1$. As a result, 511 is a palindromic number and a repdigit in base 2 (111111111_{2}). It is also palindromic and a repdigit in base 8 (777_{8}).

It is a generalized heptagonal number (sequence A085787 in the OEIS), since $511=\frac{1}{2}(5n^2-3n)$ when $n=-14$.

It is a Harshad number in bases 3, 5, 7, 10, 13 and 15.

== Special use in computers ==
The octal representation of 511 (777_{8}) is commonly used by Unix commands to specify a custom record separator in order to "slurp" input as a whole, rather than line-by-line (i.e. separated at newline characters).
