= Emperor Suizei =

Legendary emperor of Japan

Emperor Suizei 綏靖天皇
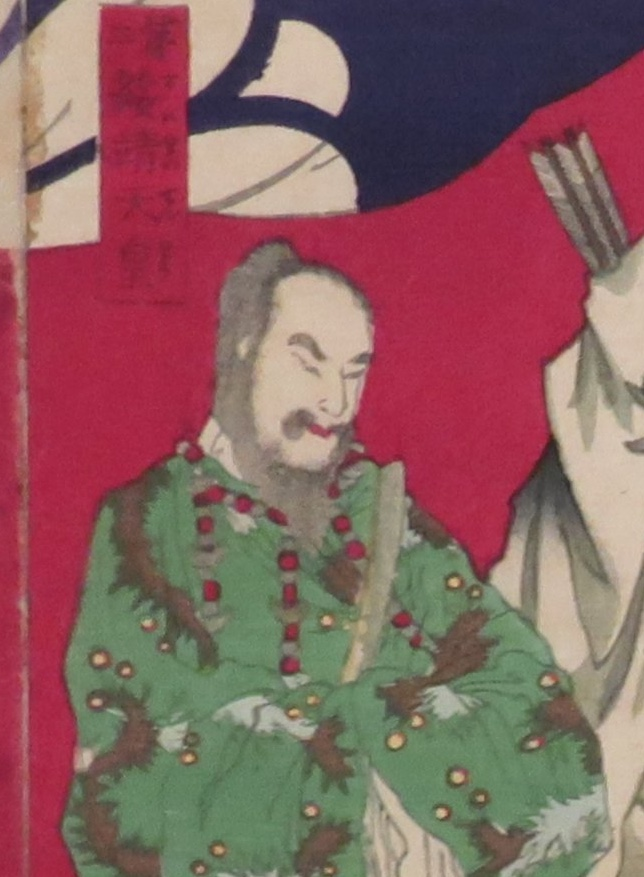
- 1878 Picture of Suizei

Emperor of Japan
- Reign: 581 BC – 549 BC (traditional)
- Predecessor: Jimmu
- Successor: Annei
- Born: 632 BC
- Died: 549 BC (aged 83)
- Burial: Tsukida no oka no e no misasagi (桃花鳥田丘上陵) (Kashihara) (legendary)
- Spouse: Isuzuyori-hime
- Issue: Emperor Annei
Posthumous name
- Chinese-style shigō: Emperor Suizei (綏靖天皇) Japanese-style shigō: Kamu-nunakawamimi no Sumeramikoto (神渟名川耳天皇)
- House: Imperial House of Japan
- Father: Emperor Jimmu
- Mother: Himetataraisuzu-hime
- Religion: Shinto

Emperor Suizei (綏靖天皇, Suizei-tennō (Note: Sometimes romanized as Suisei)), also known as Kamununakawamimi no Mikoto (神沼河耳命), was the second legendary emperor of Japan according to the traditional order of succession. Very little is known about this Emperor due to a lack of material available for further verification and study. Suizei is known as a "legendary emperor" among historians as his actual existence is disputed. A legendary account from the Kojiki states that Suizei became emperor after receiving the title of crown prince by his half brother due to his bravery regarding a murder plot. Suizei's reign started in 581 BC, he had one wife and a sole son who supposedly became the next emperor upon his death in 549 BC.

== Legendary narrative ==
While the Kojiki provides little information about Suizei, it does state his name, genealogy, and a record about his accession to the throne. He was born sometime in 632 BC, and was one of the sons of Emperor Jimmu and his chief wife Himetataraisuzu-hime. The account in the Kojiki states that Suizei's older brother Kamuyaimimi was originally the Crown-prince. When Jimmu died, another of his sons named Tagishimimi attempted to seize the throne by murdering those in his way. Tagishimimi was born to a lesser wife named Ahiratsu-hime, and was older than Jimmu's legitimate heir. When Himetataraisuzu-hime learned of the plot she tried in vain to warn her sons by way of songs and poems. While Suizei encouraged Kamuyaimimi to slay Tagishimimi, he could not find it in him to murder his own half brother. Suizei pleaded with his older brother for the weapon he was going to use, and upon receiving it accomplished the deed for him. Kamuyaimimi ceded his rights as crown prince shortly after to Suizei as he believed his braver younger brother should be the new Emperor.

Emperor Suizei's pre-ascension name remains unknown, but the Kojiki records that he ruled from the palace of Takaoka-no-miya (葛城高岡宮) (Note: In the Nihon Shoki as 葛城高丘宮) at Katsuragi in what would come to be known as Yamato Province. While another more expansive account exists in the Nihon Shoki, the section is more steeped in myth. Suizei is conventionally considered to have reigned from 581 to 549 BC. He wed Isuzuyori-hime at an unknown date, and the two had one son. Emperor Suizei allegedly died in 549 BC and his gravesite is formally named Tsukida no oka no e no misasagi. He was succeeded by his only son, Prince Shikitsuhikotamatemi who became Emperor Annei.

== Known information ==
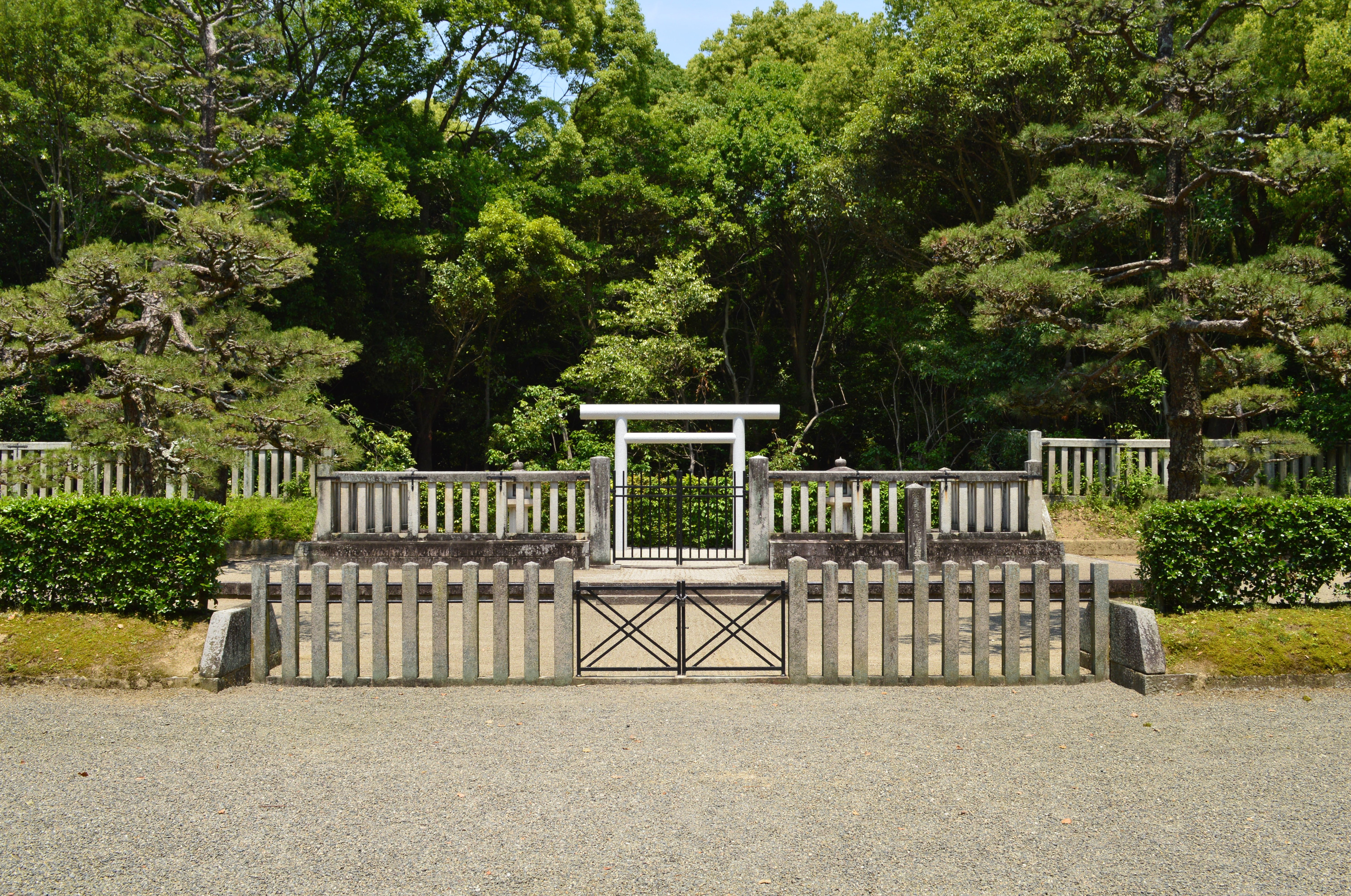
Picture of haisho(配所) of the tomb(Misasagi) of Suizei in Kashihara, Nara.

The existence of at least the first nine Emperors is disputed due to insufficient material available for further verification and study. Suizei is thus regarded by historians as a "legendary Emperor", and is ranked as the first of eight Emperors without specific legends associated with them. (Note: Also known as the "eight undocumented monarchs" (欠史八代, Kesshi-hachidai).) The name Suizei-tennō was assigned to him posthumously by later generations, and literally means "joyfully healthy peace". His name might have been regularized centuries after the lifetime ascribed to Suizei, possibly during the time in which legends about the origins of the imperial dynasty were compiled as the chronicles known today as the Kojiki. While the actual site of his grave is not known, an Imperial misasagi or tomb for Suizei is currently maintained in Kashihara. The first emperor that historians state might have actually existed is Emperor Sujin, the 10th emperor of Japan. Outside of the Kojiki, the reign of Emperor Kinmei (Note: The 29th Emperor) (c. 509 – 571 AD) is the first for which contemporary historiography is able to assign verifiable dates. The conventionally accepted names and dates of the early Emperors were not confirmed as "traditional" though, until the reign of Emperor Kanmu (Note: Kanmu was the 50th sovereign of the imperial dynasty) between 737 and 806 AD.

== Consorts and children ==
- Empress: Isuzuyori-hime, Kotoshironushi's daughter
  - Prince Shikitsuhikotamatemi (磯城津彦玉手看尊), later Emperor Annei

A genealogical tree based on the Kojiki

	Himetataraisuzu-hime		Emperor Jimmu		Ahiratsu-hime
Kamuyaimimi		Hikoyai‡	Emperor Suizei	Tagishimimi	Kisumimi

‡ not in the Nihon Shoki

== See also ==
- Emperor of Japan
- Imperial cult
- List of Emperors of Japan

== Notes ==
Regnal titles
Preceded by Emperor Jimmu	Legendary Emperor of Japan; 581 BC – 549 BC (traditional dates)	Succeeded by Emperor Annei
