= 512 BC =

512 BC in various calendars
- Gregorian calendar: 512 BC; DXII BC
- Ab urbe condita: 242
- Ancient Egypt era: XXVII dynasty, 14
- Pharaoh: Darius I of Persia, 10
- Ancient Greek Olympiad (summer): 67th Olympiad (victor)¹
- Assyrian calendar: 4239
- Balinese saka calendar: N/A
- Bengali calendar: −1105 – −1104
- Berber calendar: 439
- Buddhist calendar: 33
- Burmese calendar: −1149
- Byzantine calendar: 4997–4998
- Chinese calendar: 戊子年 (Earth Rat); 2186 or 1979 — to — 己丑年 (Earth Ox); 2187 or 1980
- Coptic calendar: −795 – −794
- Discordian calendar: 655
- Ethiopian calendar: −519 – −518
- Hebrew calendar: 3249–3250
- Hindu calendars
- Vikram Samvat: −455 – −454
- Shaka Samvat: N/A
- Kali Yuga: 2589–2590
- Holocene calendar: 9489
- Iranian calendar: 1133 BP – 1132 BP
- Islamic calendar: 1168 BH – 1167 BH
- Javanese calendar: N/A
- Julian calendar: N/A
- Korean calendar: 1822
- Minguo calendar: 2423 before ROC 民前2423年
- Nanakshahi calendar: −1979
- Thai solar calendar: 31–32
- Tibetan calendar: ས་ཕོ་བྱི་བ་ལོ་ (male Earth-Rat) −385 or −766 or −1538 — to — ས་མོ་གླང་ལོ་ (female Earth-Ox) −384 or −765 or −1537

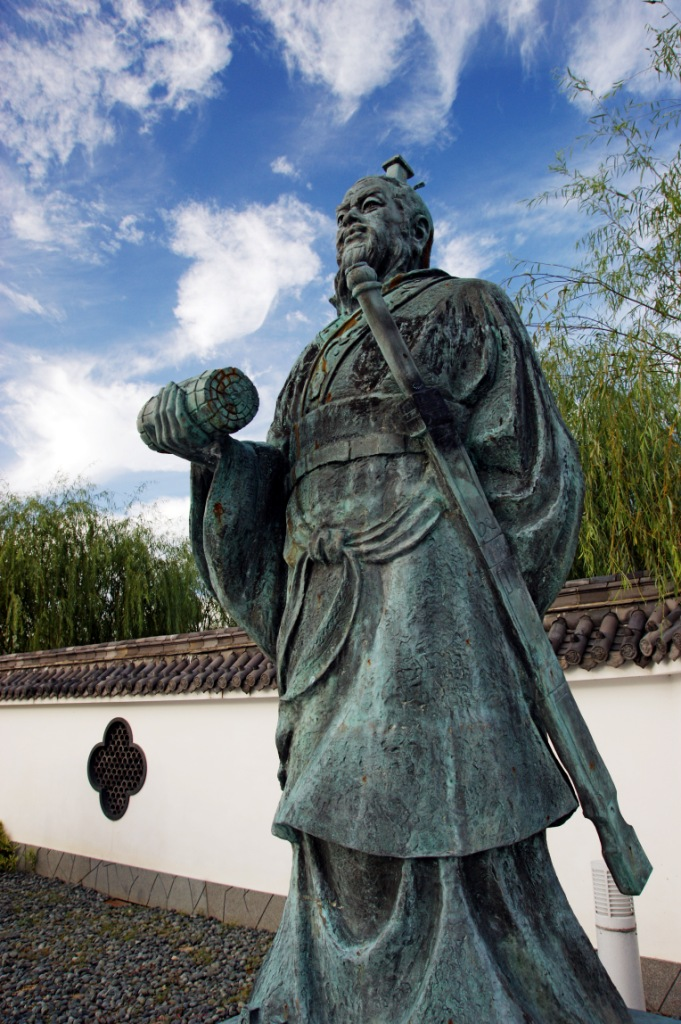
Statue of Sun Tzu (544–496 BC)

The year 512 BC was a year of the pre-Julian Roman calendar. In the Roman Empire, it was known as year 242 Ab urbe condita . The denomination 512 BC for this year has been used since the early medieval period, when the Anno Domini calendar era became the prevalent method in Europe for naming years.

== Events ==
=== By place ===
==== China ====
- Sun Tzu, author of The Art of War, begins serving King Helü of the State of Wu as his general and military strategist (approximate date).
- The State of Xu is disestablished following attacks by the states of Wu and Chu.

== Births ==
- Tantai Mieming

== Deaths ==
- Qing, ruler (duke) of the State of Jin
