= Taira no Yoshifumi =

Samurai lord

Taira no Yoshifumi (平 良文) was a Japanese samurai lord of the Heian period. Dubbed the "father of Musashi Plain development," the eight Taira clans of East Japan are said to have descended from him. He was also known as Muraoka Gorō.

== Life ==
Yoshifumi was born in Kyoto, the fifth son of Taira no Takamochi (Prince Takamochi). He was the great-great-grandson of Emperor Kanmu.

Yoshifumi is said to have been a brave warlord with a gentle appearance. He was also known as Muraoka Gorō, which derives from Muraoka, though it is disputed whether this refers to Muraoka in Kamakura, Sagami Province (present-day Fujisawa, Kanagawa Prefecture) or Ōsato, Musashi Province (present-day Kumagaya, Saitama Prefecture).

When his father Takamochi was sent to the east in 898, the sons of his official wife, Taira no Kunika, Taira no Yoshikane, and Taira no Yoshimochi, followed him, but as the son of his concubine, Yoshifumi, did not.

In 923, at the age of 36, Yoshifumi received an imperial edict from Emperor Daigo to "quench the bandits in Sagami Province" and went to the east region to defeat them.

In 940, the death of Taira no Masakado was reported to the capital in Geki Nikki, indicating that Yoshifumi had joined the side of Fujiwara no Hidesato and Taira no Sadamori.

There is no mention of Yoshifumi in Shōmonki, and his detailed movements during the Jōhei Tengyō War are unknown. However, it is speculated that he may have been in Muraoka in Musashi Province or in Sagami Province and fought on Masakado's side. Taira no Shigemori, who opposed Masakado, was called "a mortal enemy" by his son Tadayori, and it is therefore assumed that Yoshifumi was a close associate of Masakado. However, there is a theory that identifies a "Taira no Yoshi", who is said to have first reported about the death of Masakado, as Taira no Yoshifumi and that he had in fact been on the opposing side of Masakado. Furthermore, according to Genpei Tōjōroku, he was adopted by Masakado, his nephew, and became his heir.

In Konjaku Monogatari, Yoshifumi is seen fighting against Minamoto no Atsuru.

== Genealogy ==
Yoshifumi was called the "father of Musashi Plain development," and the eight Taira clans of Bandō (East Japan) are all listed in The Tale of the Heike and other works as descendants of Yoshifumi. Regardless of whether this is all true, his role in the development of Musashi Plain was by all means essential.

As Yoshifumi does not appear in Shōmonki, and because there is contradictory information regarding the genealogy of the eight Bandō Taira clans in Sonpi Bunmyaku, there are also historians who point out the possibility of clans that had no relation to Taira no Takamochi to have used a deceptive name.
