= Gashadokuro =

Japanese mythical creatures

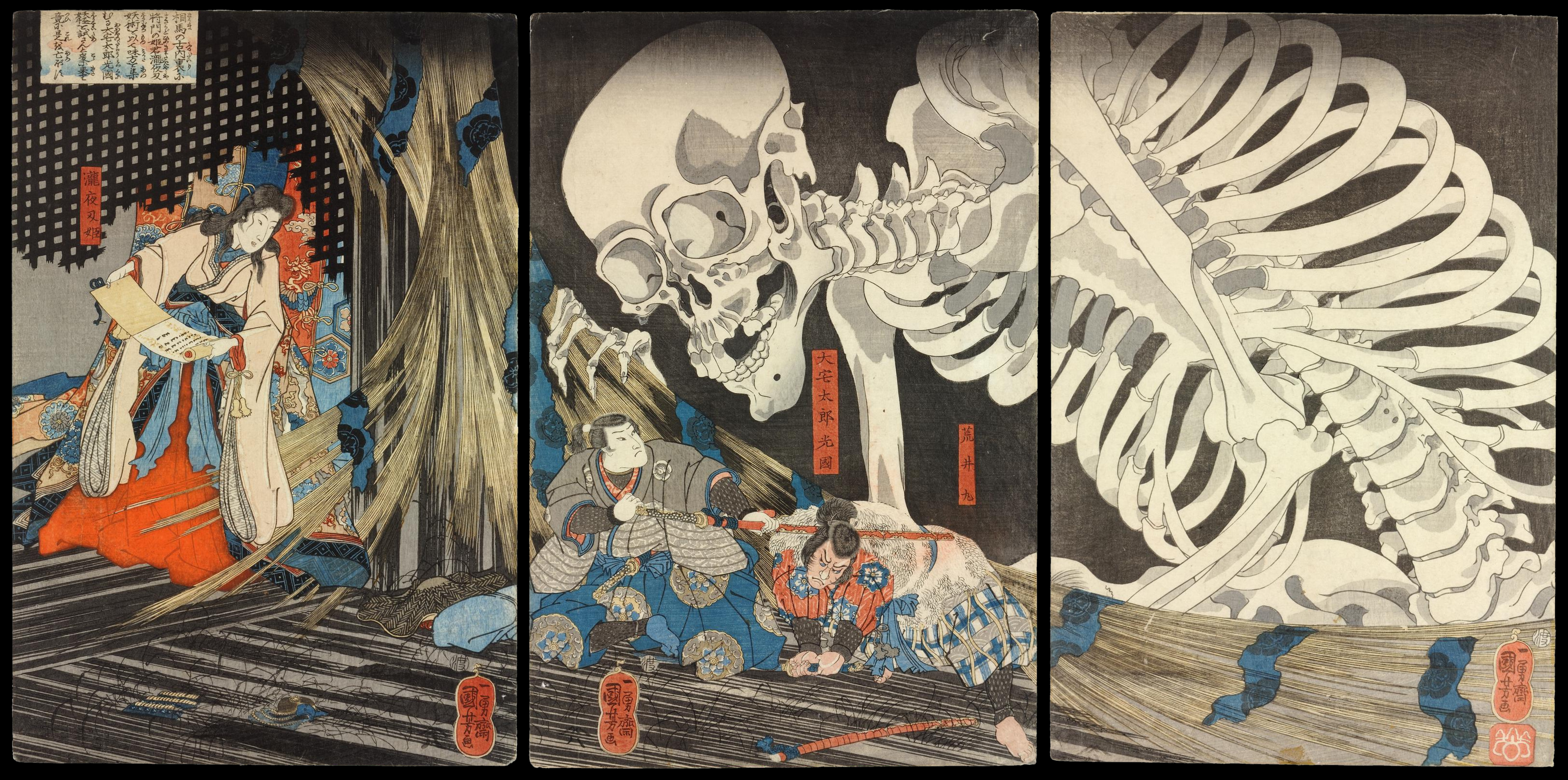
Utagawa Kuniyoshi's Sōma no furu-dairi (相馬の古内裏), also known as Takiyasha the Witch and the Skeleton Spectre

Gashadokuro (がしゃどくろ; literally "rattling skeleton", also known as Odokuro) are mythical creatures in modern Japanese mythology. It is said to pick up people they wish to eat.

== Description ==
The Gashadokuro is a spirit that takes the form of a giant skeleton made of the skulls of people who died in the battlefield or of starvation/famine (while the corpse becomes a gashadokuro, the spirit becomes a separate yōkai, known as hidarugami.), and is 10 or more meters tall. Only the eyes protrude, and some sources describe them as burning yellow or green. Gashadokuro wanders around at 2:00 a.m. and attacks and eats humans when it sees them. When a Gashadokuro approaches, it is said to make a clattering sound with its teeth "Gachi Gachi." However they are also known to be stealthy when approaching humans they wish to eat. The following characteristics are not confirmed by Japanese data. The Gashadokuro are said to possess the powers of invisibility and indestructibility since it is composed of the bones of people who are already deceased, though Shinto charms are said to ward them off. Otherwise, a Gashadokuro will continue hunting its prey until its pent up anger is released, causing the bones to crumple and the Gashadokuro to collapse.

== Mythology ==
One of the first known myths of the Gashadokuro dates back to the tenth century, when it took part in a semi-historical account. During that century in Japan, Taira no Masakado, a prominent samurai from the Kantō region, was ambushed one day by three of his cousins due to quarrelling over marriages. Enraged by this, Masakado retaliated by burning down their residence, killing one of his uncles, Kunika. Taira no Yoshimasa, who was either Masakado's parental uncle or cousin, wanted to avenge Kunika and challenged Masakado to a duel. Upon losing the duel, Yoshimasa, embarrassed by his defeat, called upon Taira no Yoshikane, another one of Masakado's relatives who fought over the same woman. Yoshikane, who was the assistant governor for Kazusa Province, was easily able to gather many warriors and other officials from his province. On the day of their battle, Masakado, despite only having around 100 poorly-equipped soldiers, was able to inflict heavy casualties on Yoshikane and Yoshimasa's forces, which was estimated to be thousands strong.

After his victory, Masakado was summoned to the imperial court in Kyoto due to complaints received about him. Fujiwara no Tadahira, Masakado's lord, however, most likely lightened his punishment and helped him get a pardon from the court. In 937, Yoshikane, anxious to avenge his humiliating defeat, once again battled with Masakado. Masakado, injured in the fight, tried to flee with his wife, Yoshikane's daughter, but was unsuccessful. In 939, Masakado started a minor rebellion referred to as the 'Tengyō no Ran' (天慶の乱) ("War in the Tengyō era" or "Tengyō Disturbance"). The armed revolt officially began when Masakado attacked one of the central government's outposts in Hitachi Province. Later that year, he conquered Shimotsuke and Kōzuke Provinces, claiming the title of Shinnō (New Emperor). The government in Kyoto acknowledged his attacks as a revolt and put a bounty on his head. Taira no Sadamori, his cousin, and Fujiwara no Hidesato killed him in 940, decapitating him and brought his head to the capital in Kyoto for a reward. Masakado's daughter, Takiyasha Hime, a famous and powerful sorceress, was infuriated at her father's killers for disrespecting him. She conjured up the first Gashadokuro with the bones of those who died in the battle along with Masakado. To take revenge, Takiyasha unleashed the Gashadokuro on Kyoto. It ravaged the city until Masakado's head was moved to Shibasaki, a fishing village that eventually became Tokyo. The head became a sort of demigod there, with a grave still standing today near the Tokyo Imperial Palace.

== In modern culture ==
The Gashadokuro is a yōkai that first appeared in print in the middle of the 20th century. In 1966, it first appeared in an article by Morihiro Saito (unnamed) published in the magazine "Bessatsu Shoujyo Friend", titled "A Special Feature on Japanese Yokai Beside You". The following year, Shigeru Mizuki appeared in the magazine "Nakayoshi 9/1967" (At this time, Kuniyoshi's painting was used as a reference), and then appeared again in Saito's article published in "Bessatsu Shonen King", and the same article was Shigeaki Yamauchi. It was also published in "World's Bizarre Thriller Complete Works 2 Monsters of the World" (Akita Shoten, 1968). Also published in Arifumi Sato's "Nihon Yokai Encyclopedia" (1972).

Both the illustrations in Sato's writings and Mizuki's are both based on the appearance of the Gashadokuro on the giant skeleton in Utagawa Kuniyoshi's ukiyo-e print, Takiyasha the Witch and the Skeleton Spectre. It has no direct connection to the Gashadokuro, but is said to have influenced modern depictions. Kuniyoshi's print was commissioned in the Edo period by Santō Kyōden for a yomihon, depicting a scene in which Taira no Masakado's daughter, Takiyasha-hime, summons a skeleton yōkai to attack the samurai Ooya Tarou Mitsukuni. Although originally described as many life-sized skeletons, Kuniyoshi depicted it as a single giant skeleton, as is characteristic of his work.

In the entry for Gashadokuro in Mizuki's book, a related tale from the Nihon Ryōiki is introduced. It tells of a man in Bingo Province (Hiroshima Prefecture) who is in a field at night and, hearing an eerie voice moaning, "My eye hurts," finds a skeleton there with a bamboo shoot growing from its eye socket. He removes the bamboo shoot and offers the skeleton dried boiled rice, upon which the skeleton tells him the story of its murder and its personal history, and rewards him for his kindness. Though this tale has been conflated with that of the Gashadokuro, the two are in fact unrelated, the Gashadokuro having originated in the later half of the 20th century.
