= Tengyō no Ran =

Medieval Japanese conflict (935–940)

Tengyō Rebellion
- Part of Heian period
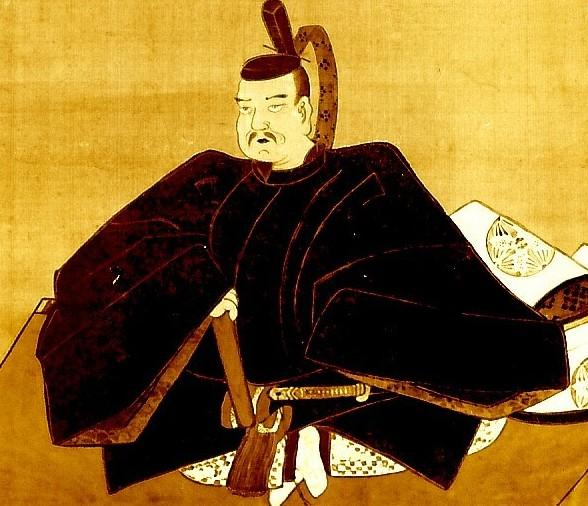
- Taira no Masakado, leader of the rebellion.
Date	935–940
Location	Kazusa, Hitachi and Shimosa province, Eastern Japan
Result	Rebellion quelled

Belligerents
Provincial landowners	Imperial Government

Commanders and leaders
Taira no Masakado †	Minamoto no Tsunemoto; Taira no Sadamori; Fujiwara no Hidesato

Strength
400 horseman, 6,000 fighters at the peak	Larger than rebels'

Casualties and losses
Significant	Significant

The Tengyō no Ran (天慶の乱) ("War in the Tengyō era" or "Tengyō Disturbance"), or Jōhei Tengyō no Ran refers to the name of a brief medieval Japanese conflict, in which Taira no Masakado rebelled against the central government. He was defeated after 59 days of fierce fighting with the imperial forces led by Fujiwara Hidesato and Taira Sadamori, who was Masakado's kinsman. One of the legends created about the conflict described how Masakado, fearing Hidesato's archery skills, employed doppelganger bodyguards to protect himself. The warrior-rebel was beheaded on 25 March 940 CE during the Battle of Kojima.

== Prelude ==
The revolt in the east began inconspicuously in 935 as an armed squabble among members of a Taira family who had settled in the Kanto area around 890. They had grown into great landowners there, exercising control over a broad area that included the provinces of Kazusa, Hitachi, and Shimosa. One of the Taira leaders, Masakado, emerged from his Shimosa base as the chief military power and principal arbiter of disputes throughout the southern Kanto area. The disputes in which he involved himself centered on the resistance of landowners to provincial governors, Masakado taking the part of the aggrieved landholders. The fighting increasingly assumed the nature of rebellion against provincial authorities, who were mostly Masakado's kinsmen. But perhaps because the eastern provinces had a long history of banditry, unrest, and minor revolts, the central government at first paid scant heed to Masakado and his fighting, intervening only when a suit was brought against him by one of his victims, and then simply to assess a mild punishment that was almost immediately canceled in a general amnesty.

=== Opposing forces ===
The military forces of Masakado and his opponents comprised the leader's close followers (jusha), a permanent bodyguard or army of mounted warriors (400 in the case of Masakado), banrui (allies), and provincial troops recruited from among the cultivators. Banrui were minor warriors, usually mounted, who were independent collaborators and quick to retire from the battlefield when the fighting went against them. Both Masakado and his enemies used the tactic of burning down the houses of their opponents' banrui and ashigaru and destroying their stored grain to weaken their resolve, from which we can understand that they were men of meager resources. Although the organization of the armies of Masakado and his enemies were generally the same, they differed in one decisively important respect: the anti-Masakado forces were an alliance of warrior leaders, at times as many as five or six Taira and also a Minamoto and a Fujiwara, each with his own group of close followers. Professional warriors of Masakado's time (tsuwamono) were archers on horseback. They did not by choice engage in hand-to-hand combat with swords. Nor did the mounted men carry lances, as they did in Europe. Masakado's forces also included ashigaru armed with spears and shields, employed in mass tactics, in the tradition of the earlier imperial conscript armies.

== Rebellion ==
The fighting between Masakado and his opponents, as it evolved through its several stages, was destructive and murderous, but the participants continued throughout the first years to appeal to the court at Kyoto for justice. Imperial authority, although almost non-existent in the east, was still recognized even by Masakado himself. Then, at the end of 939, Masakado became involved in a dispute over taxes between a member of the local gentry in Hitachi and the governor of the province. Before the affair ended, he had burned the provincial headquarters, seized the official signet of the province, and made off with the key to the provincial storehouse. Even the inward-looking court at Heian could scarcely ignore so direct a challenge to its authority or income. At the urging of a certain Prince Okiyo, a former provincial official in Musashi who helped Masakado in another dispute with local officials in 939, Masakado set out then to seize control of all the eight Kanto provinces, acting on Okiyo's famous observation that the punishment for rebellion in many provinces was no worse than for that in one. Claiming that he was obeying an oracle from the Great Bodhisattva Hachiman and justifying his action on the ground that he was a descendant of Emperor Kanmu, Masakado proclaimed himself the "New Emperor" (shinno), in contradistinction to the old tenno at Heian.

=== New Emperor ===
Masakado appointed new officials to the provinces and he also began to fashion a rustic version of the central statutory government centered in Shimosa. Masakado sent a message to the capital addressed to Fujiwara no Tadahira, under whom in his youth he had enrolled himself as a follower. He sought the regent's understanding of his actions, and also suggested that his ambitions did not extend beyond the Kanto, thus proposing in effect a division of the country between the regental Fujiwara and his own warrior family. By that time, however, the authorities at court were thoroughly alarmed, convinced that Masakado's forces would soon be descending on Kyoto. They adopted a three-way policy aimed at ending the rebellion: (1) prayer; (2) the appointment of Pursuit and Apprehension Agents (tsuibushi) in the eastern provinces and, in the spring of 940, three or four months after Masakado's attack on the Hitachi provincial headquarters, the dispatch of a court commander, Fujiwara no Tadafumi, to the east; and (3) promises of reward to provincial leaders who succeeded in subduing Masakado. Significantly, it was the third prong of the policy - reliance on provincial warrior leaders - that actually brought Masakado down. While the specially deputed court commander was still en route to the east at the beginning of 940, Masakado was surprised at his base in Shimosa with a depleted force and was killed by the joint forces of his cousin, Taira no Sadamori, and the Shimotsuke Suppression and Control Agent (oryoshi) Fujiwara no Hidesato.

=== Causes of defeat ===
The failure of the revolt seems to have been chiefly a result of organizational weakness. Masakado's lack of a retainership system meant that his coalition force of antigovernment landholders tended to fragment after initial successes had achieved the aims of the landholders, and the dispersal of his large force of cultivators to their agricultural pursuits left him exposed at a critical moment to the overwhelming alliance of hostile forces. (The Shomonki says that Masakado's force, which had once numbered as many as six thousand, had been reduced to a thousand men.) The imperial court's military response to the revolt may not have been as ineffective as it seems. The punitive expedition dispatched from the capital against Masakado arrived at the scene after his defeat, but its expected advent in the fighting presumably entered into the calculations of the contending sides. Hidesato participated in the fighting as an imperially appointed officer, holding one of the key titles recently created by the court as it reconstituted its military. Following the abandonment of the conscript-army system in the late eighth century and afterward, the statutory regime continued as before to rely for military strength on the richer and more powerful elements of rural society, asserting authority and control through a loose, evolving structure of ad hoc and permanent titles that deputized individual warriors to exercise force in defense of the regime or for the maintenance of public order.

== Aftermath ==
The revolt of Masakado and the piracy of Fujiwara Sumitomo, that took place in the west at the same time, proved to be not as serious threats as the court imagined; but some key elements in the origins, prosecution, and suppression of the revolts were emblematic harbingers of the great historical changes and tumult that came during the following two and a half centuries. The suppression of Masakado's revolt did not result in an assertion of court authority in the east. Rather, the revolt and its suppression confirmed the private wealth and military strength of the local leaders. Masakado and his principal opponents, Taira no Sadamori, Fujiwara no Hidesato, and Minamoto no Tsunemoto (the vice-governor of Musashi who brought the initial charge of rebellion against Masakado at court), were the ancestors of most of the important warrior leaders in the east during the remainder of the Heian period, and it was from the east that the decisive military power flowed in the fateful twelfth century. All four men were alike in being descendants of the highest strata of the court nobility (the imperial line and the Fujiwara clan). Their ancestors had received appointments in the ninth and tenth centuries to provincial or military posts in the east and had settled and prospered there after the terms of their offices had expired. On the other hand, their descendants will fight over supremacy in the whole of Japan during the Genpei War (1180-1185).
