= Kanda Shrine =

Shinto shrine in Tokyo, Japan

Kanda Shrine 神田明神
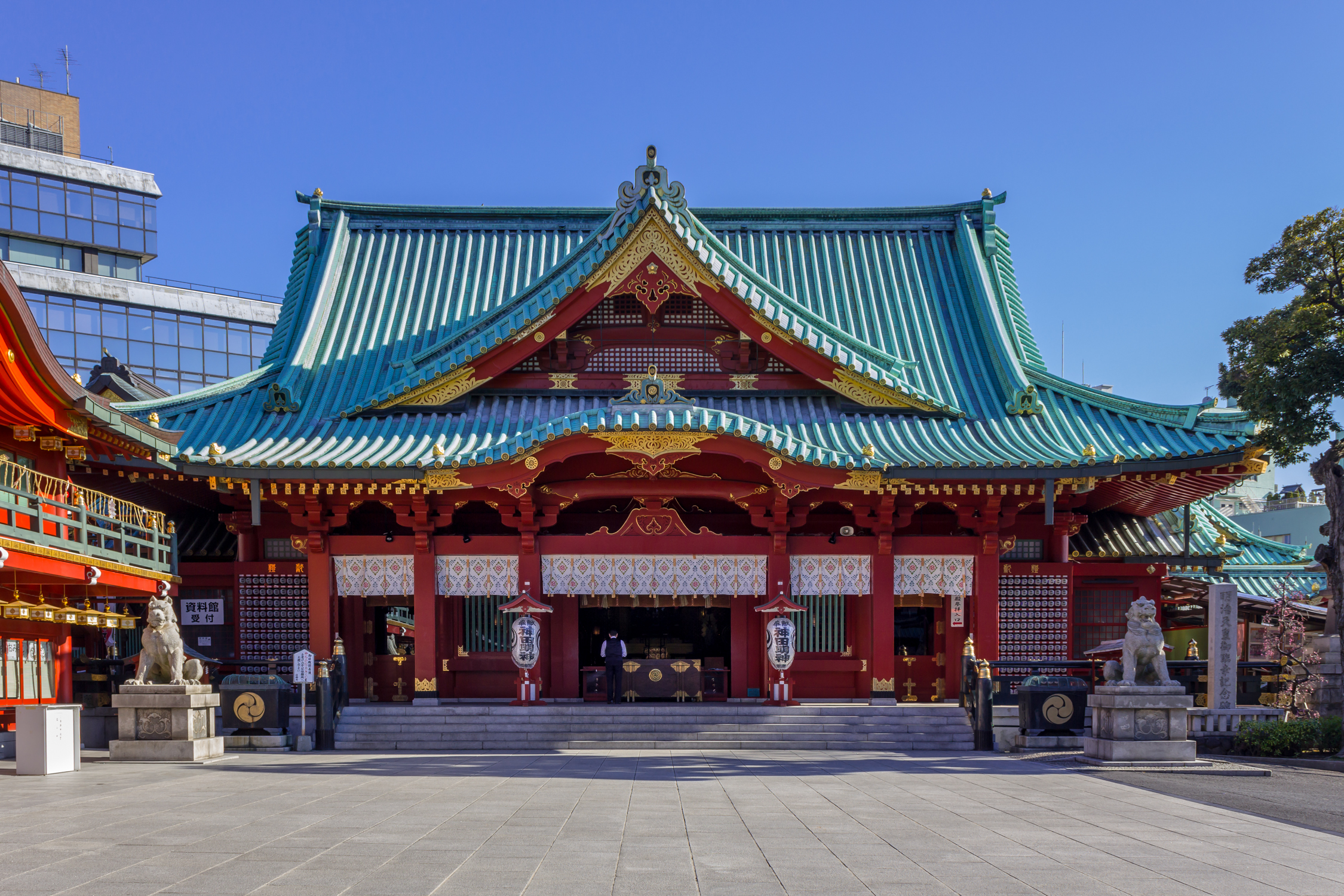
- The Kanda Shrine honden

- Location within Japan

Religion
- Affiliation: Shinto
- Deity: Ōnamuchi (Daikoku); Sukunabikona (Ebisu); Taira no Masakado

Location
- Location: 2-16-2, Soto-Kanda, Chiyoda, Tokyo 〒 101-0021
- Coordinates: 35°42′07″N 139°46′04″E

Architecture
- Established: 730

Website
- www.kandamyoujin.or.jp

Kanda Shrine (神田明神, Kanda-myōjin; officially 神田神社 Kanda-jinja) is a Shinto shrine located in Chiyoda, Tokyo, Japan. The shrine dates back 1,270 years, but the current structure was rebuilt several times due to fire and earthquakes. It is situated in one of the most expensive estate areas of Tokyo. Kanda Shrine was an important shrine to both the warrior class and citizens of Japan, especially during the Edo period, when shōgun Tokugawa Ieyasu paid his respects at Kanda Shrine. Due in part to the proximity of the Kanda Shrine to Akihabara, the shrine has become a mecca for technophiles who frequent Akihabara.

== History ==
Kanda Shrine was first built in the second year of the Tenpyō Era (730 AD), in the fishing village of Shibasaki, near the modern Ōtemachi district. In order to accommodate the expansion of Edo Castle, the shrine was later moved to the former Kanda ward in 1603, then moved once again to its modern site on a small hill near Akihabara in 1616. The shrine has been rebuilt and restored many times. The current structure was destroyed in the 1923 Great Kantō earthquake and rebuilt in 1934 with concrete, and thus survived the Tokyo firebombing of World War II, unlike many of Japan's historical structures. Restoration is being done on Kanda Shrine, and work continues today. The most recent change to this areal was the removal of the red-wooden treasure-holding sidebuilding left to the shrine (where symbols and wishes and other goods of religious and souvenirs are being sold) to make room for a new cultural location, the EDOCCO Edo Culture Complex, which got finished in December 2018, commemorating the 1300 year old tradition of the shrine.

Due to its proximity to the Akihabara Electric Town, the shrine has become a mecca for the technophiles who frequent Akihabara. The Kanda Shrine sells talismans specifically for blessing electronic devices against the types of harm that could come to them.

== Architecture ==
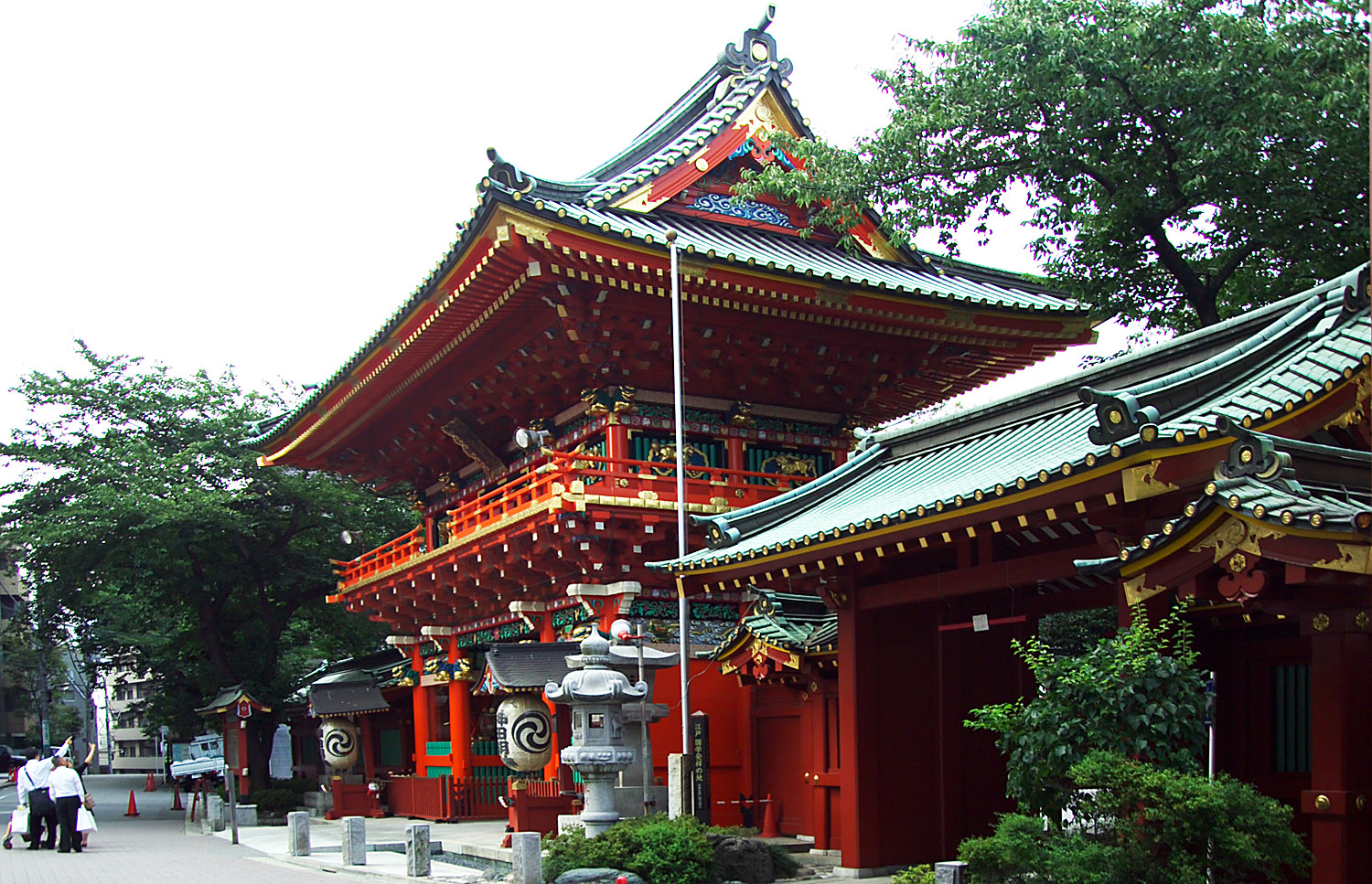
Zuishin-mon

The two-storey main gate, Zuishin-mon (隨神門), marks the entrance to Kanda Shrine. Zuishin-mon was reconstructed in 1995 with cypress wood, and is built with an irimoya styled roof. The shrine building is constructed in the Shinto style of Gongen-zukuri. It is painted vermilion, and decorated with gold and lacquered interiors. Many sculptures of its enshrined kami can be found on the building grounds.

== Enshrined kami ==
The three major kami enshrined are Daikokuten, Ebisu, and Taira no Masakado. As Daikokuten and Ebisu both belong to the Seven Gods of Fortune (Japanese, "Shichifukujin"), Kanda Shrine is a popular place for businessmen and entrepreneurs to pray for wealth and prosperity.

Taira no Masakado was a land-owning government official who led a massive insurrection against the Heian government and declared himself the "New Emperor" (新皇). He was later elevated to the status of a local kami out of a mixture of fear and reverence. He is an important figure in the shrine's history. After his defeat in 940 AD, he was decapitated by Fujiwara no Hidesato and his severed head was brought to the Shibasaki (Edo) area in a wooden bucket (首桶) and buried on a low hill near the shrine's location today. Locals who respected his defiance, and fearing his curse, enshrined him in Kanda Shrine, and his spirit is said to watch over the surrounding areas. It was rumored that when his shrine fell into disrepair, Masakado's angry spirit wrought natural disasters and plagues upon the nearby lands. It is also said that Tokugawa Ieyasu felt uncomfortable to have his castle built close to such a powerful spirit, and so decided to move Kanda Shrine to its modern location.

During the Meiji period, the Emperor Meiji was faced with public pressure to include Kanda Shrine in the Tokyo Ten Shrines (東京十社, Tokyo Jissha), but hesitated to do so because of the shrine's association with Taira no Masakado, who was seen as a dangerous anti-government demagogue. This was temporarily resolved by removing Taira no Masakado as an enshrined kami. However, Masakado's spirit proved so popular amongst the commoners, that it was symbolically returned to the shrine after the Second World War.

== Festivals ==
Kanda festival (Kanda Matsuri) is one of the three major Shinto festivals of Tokyo, started in 1600 by Tokugawa Ieyasu to celebrate his decisive victory at the battle of Sekigahara. At the time, the festival was important enough to be named a state festival, and its highly decorated mikoshi were paraded down the main streets and into Edo castle, so that even the shōgun could observe the celebrations. Today, it is held in honor of the enshrined kami, and celebrated around May 15 of every odd year.

Daikoku festival is also held at Kanda Shrine in January.

== Cultural references ==
In the anime and multimedia franchise Love Live! School Idol Project, the character Nozomi Tojo serves as a shrine maiden at the Kandamyoujin shrine, while she and the other members of protagonist idol group μ's train by running up and down stairs leading to the shrine. In 2015, the shrine's administrators named Nozomi as an official mascot.

== Images ==
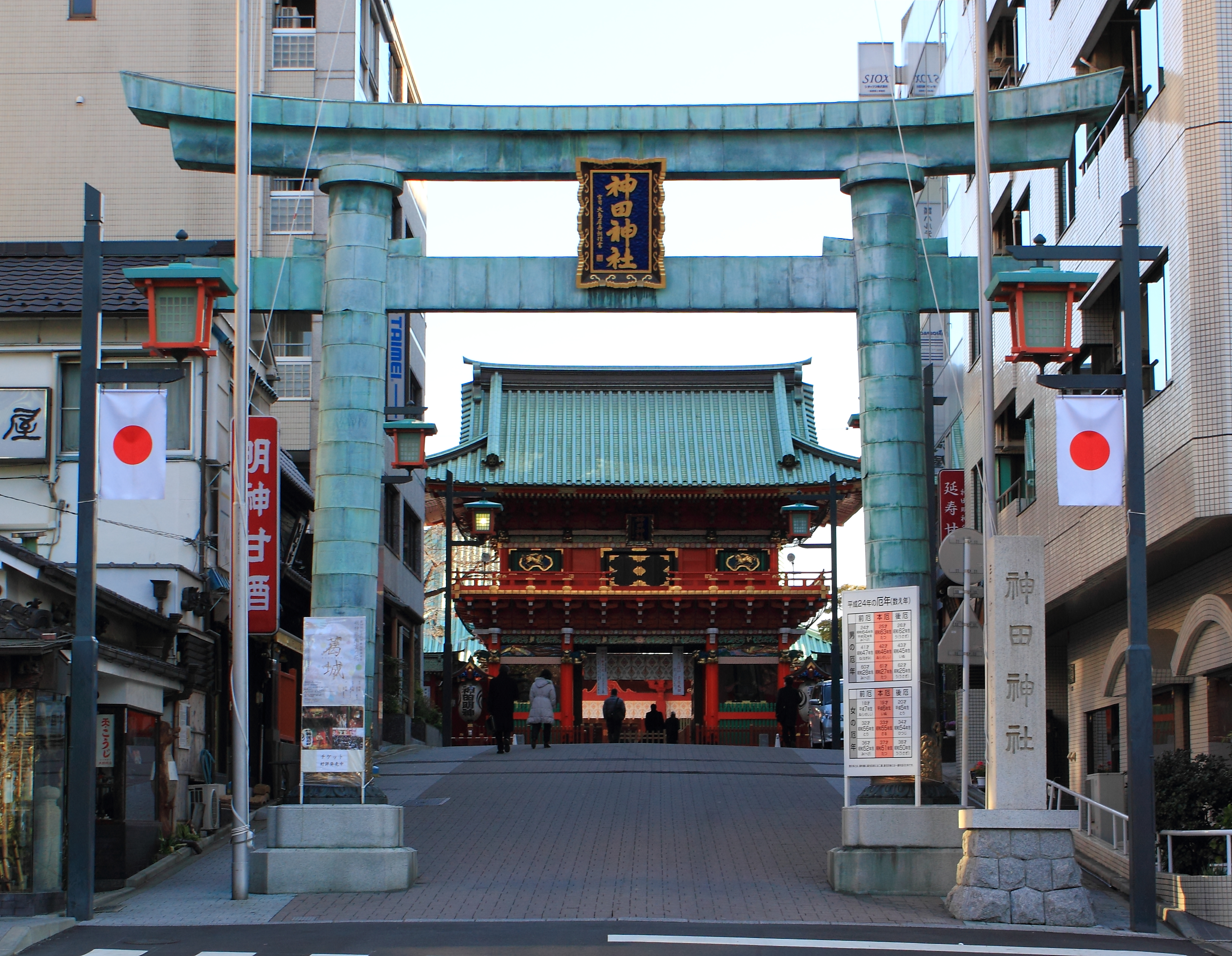
Torii

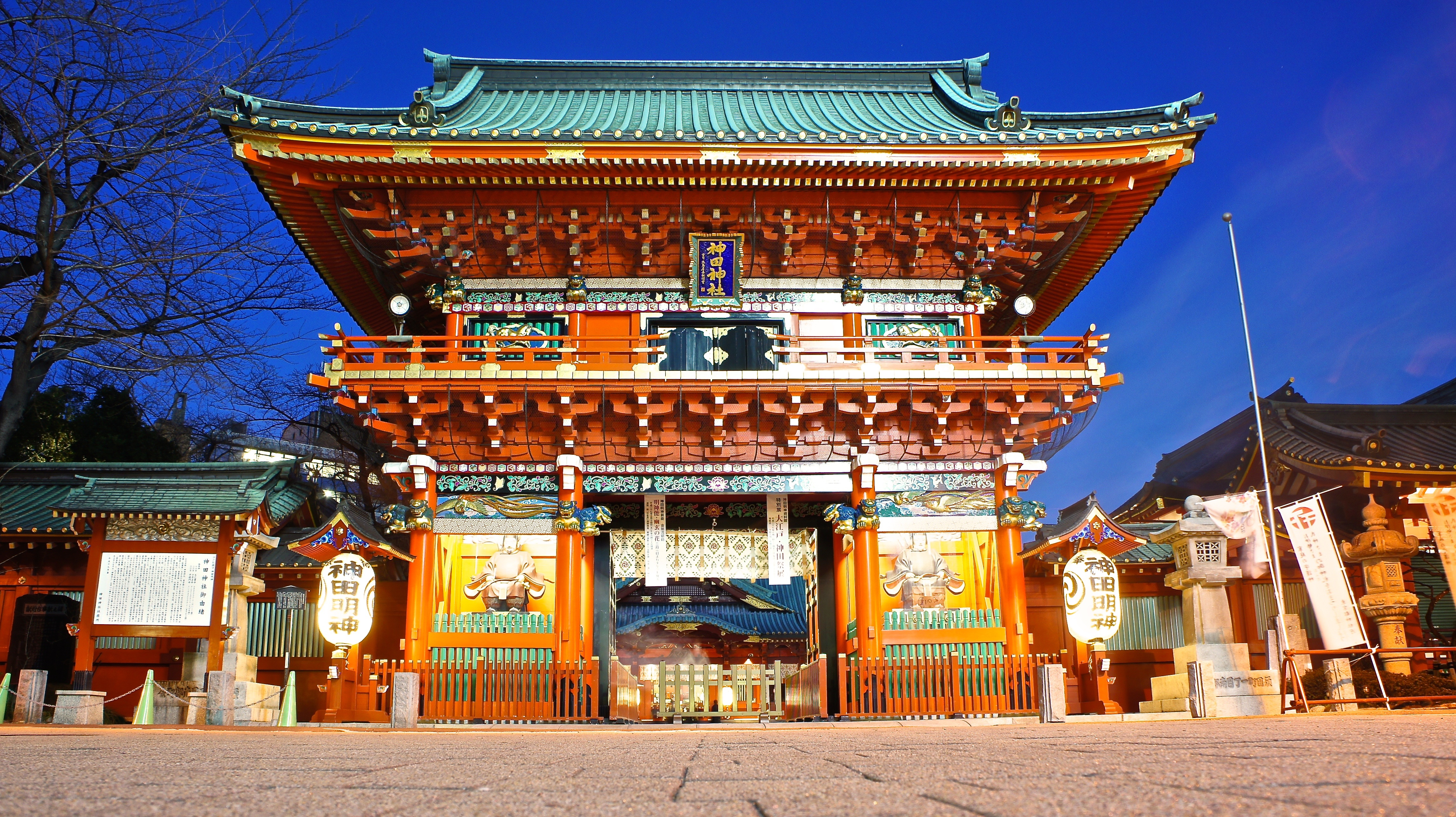
Entrance to Kanda Myojin Shrine at night

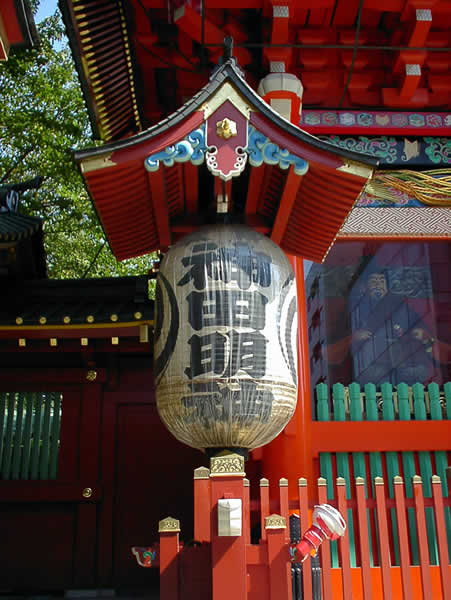
Paper lantern

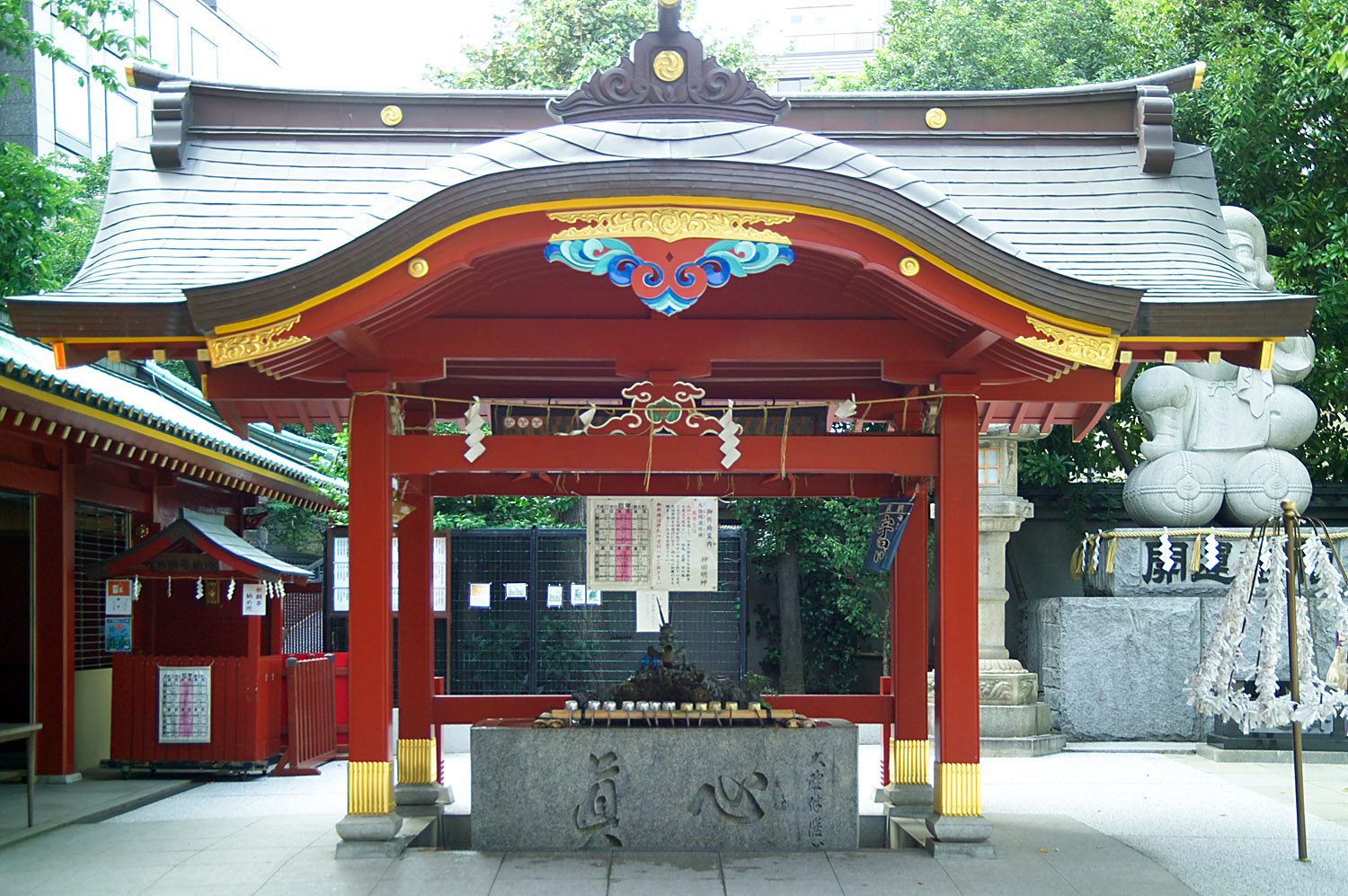
Chōzuya pavilion

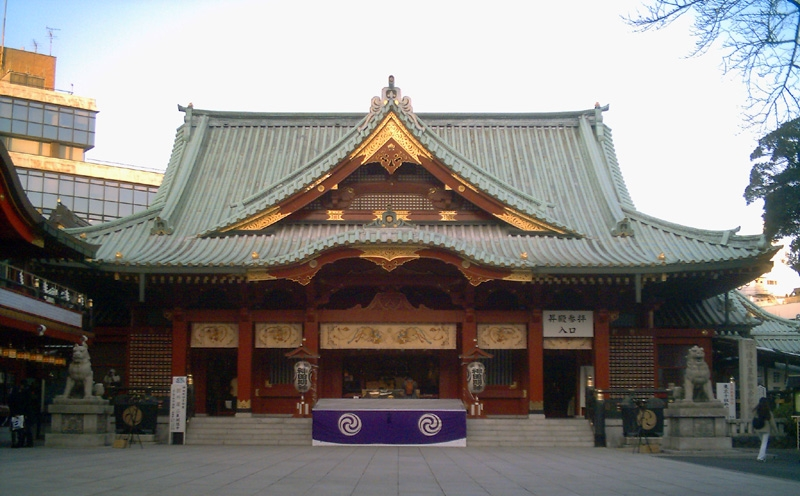
The Honden

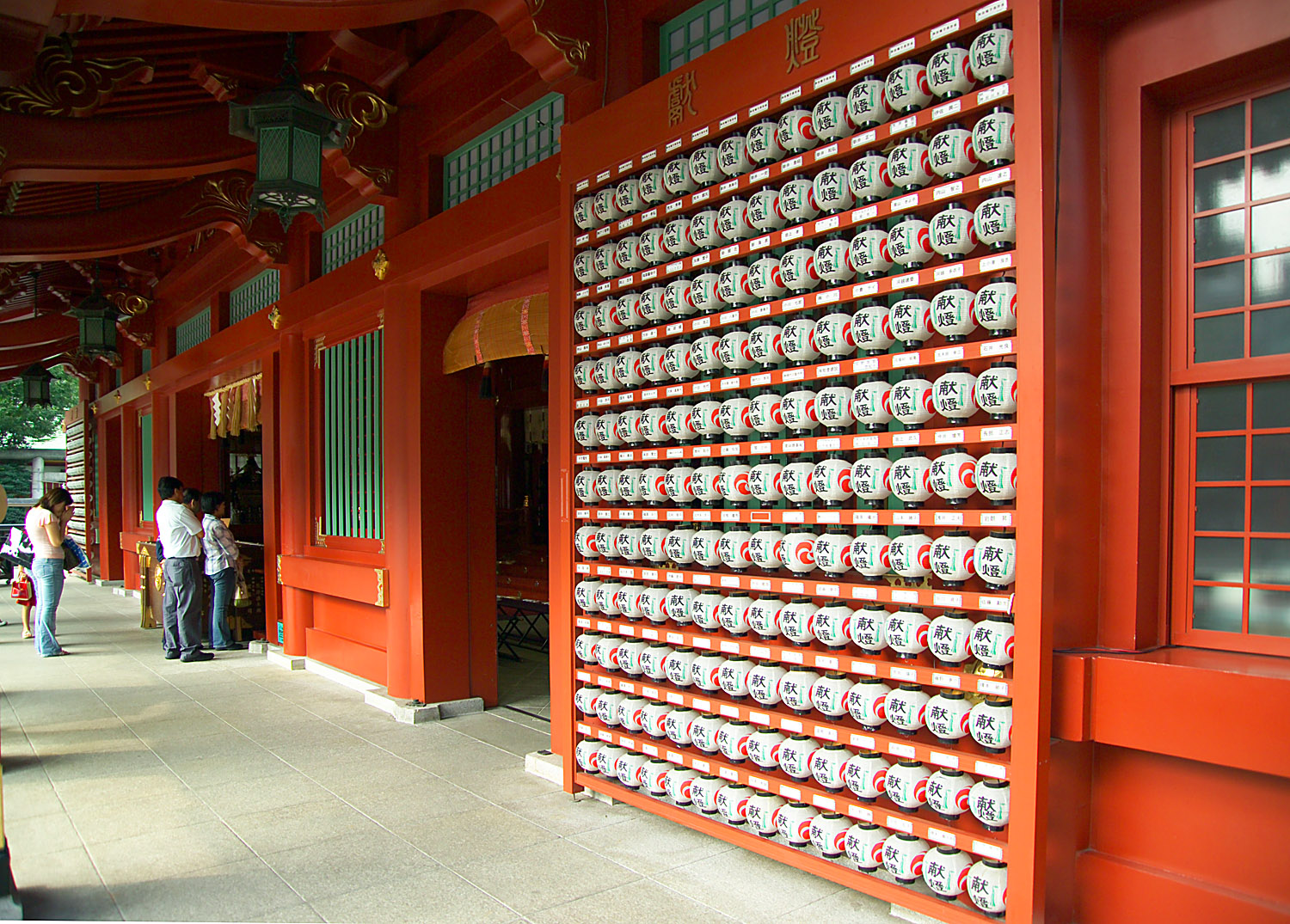
Lanterns

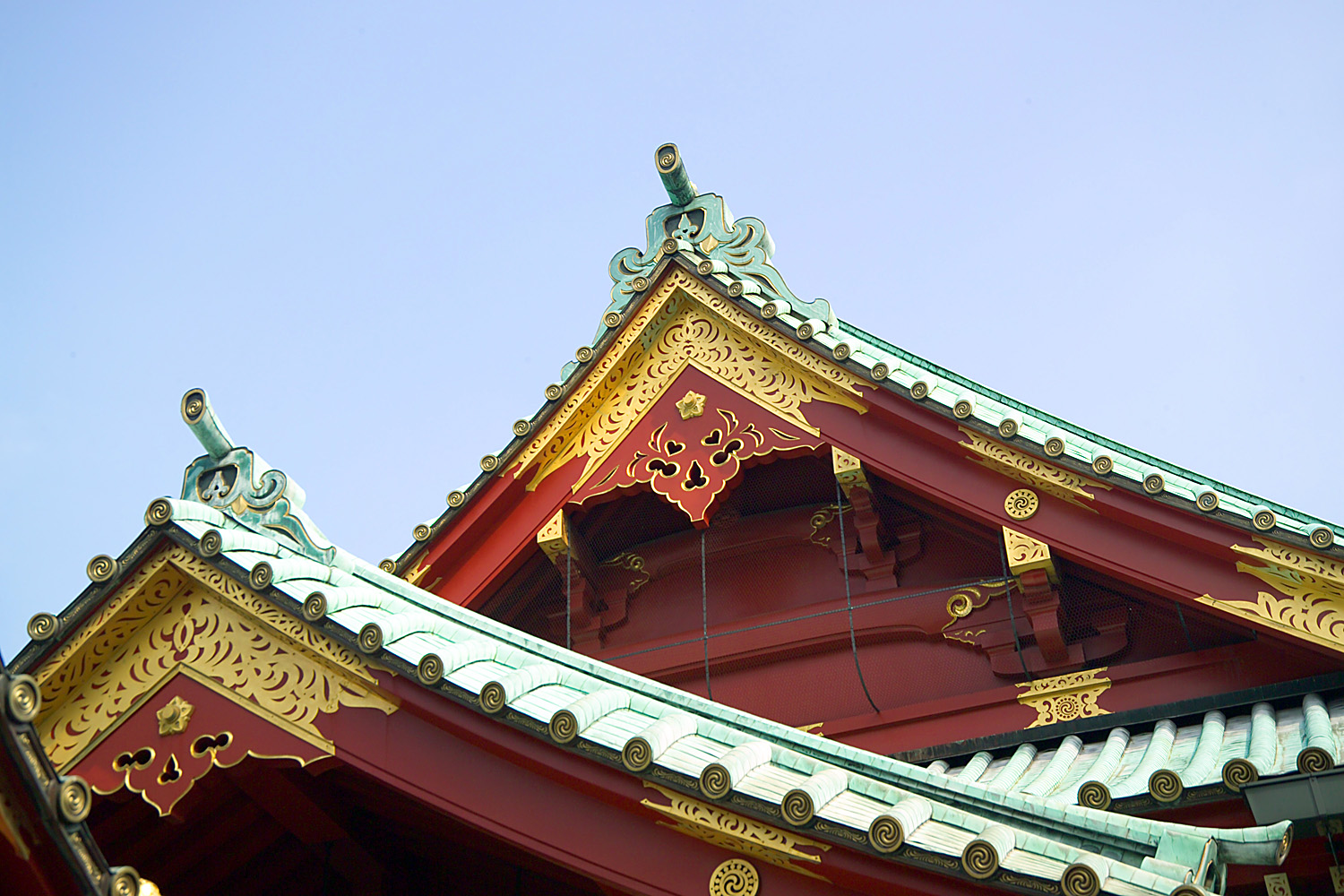
Roof designs

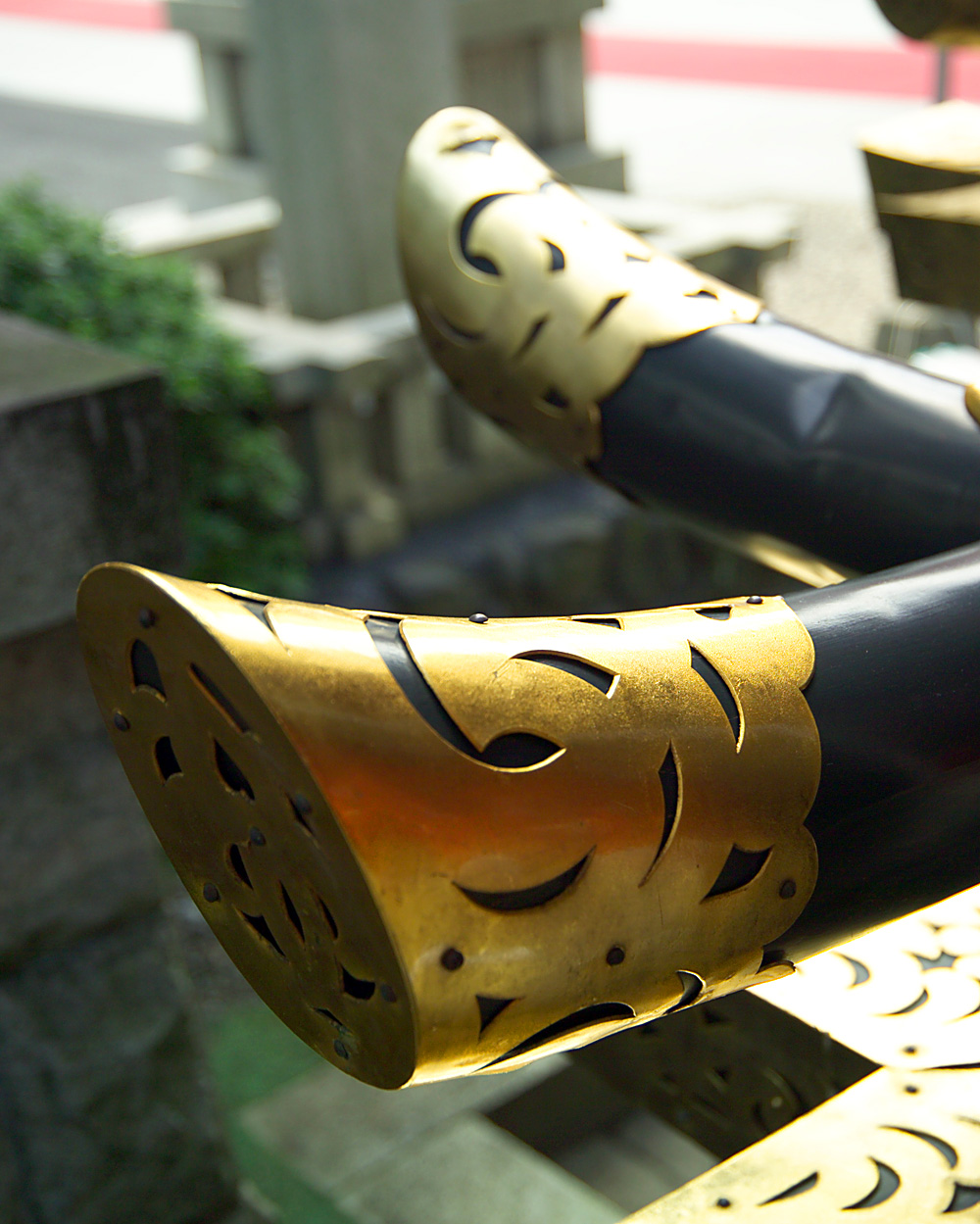
Rail ornamentation

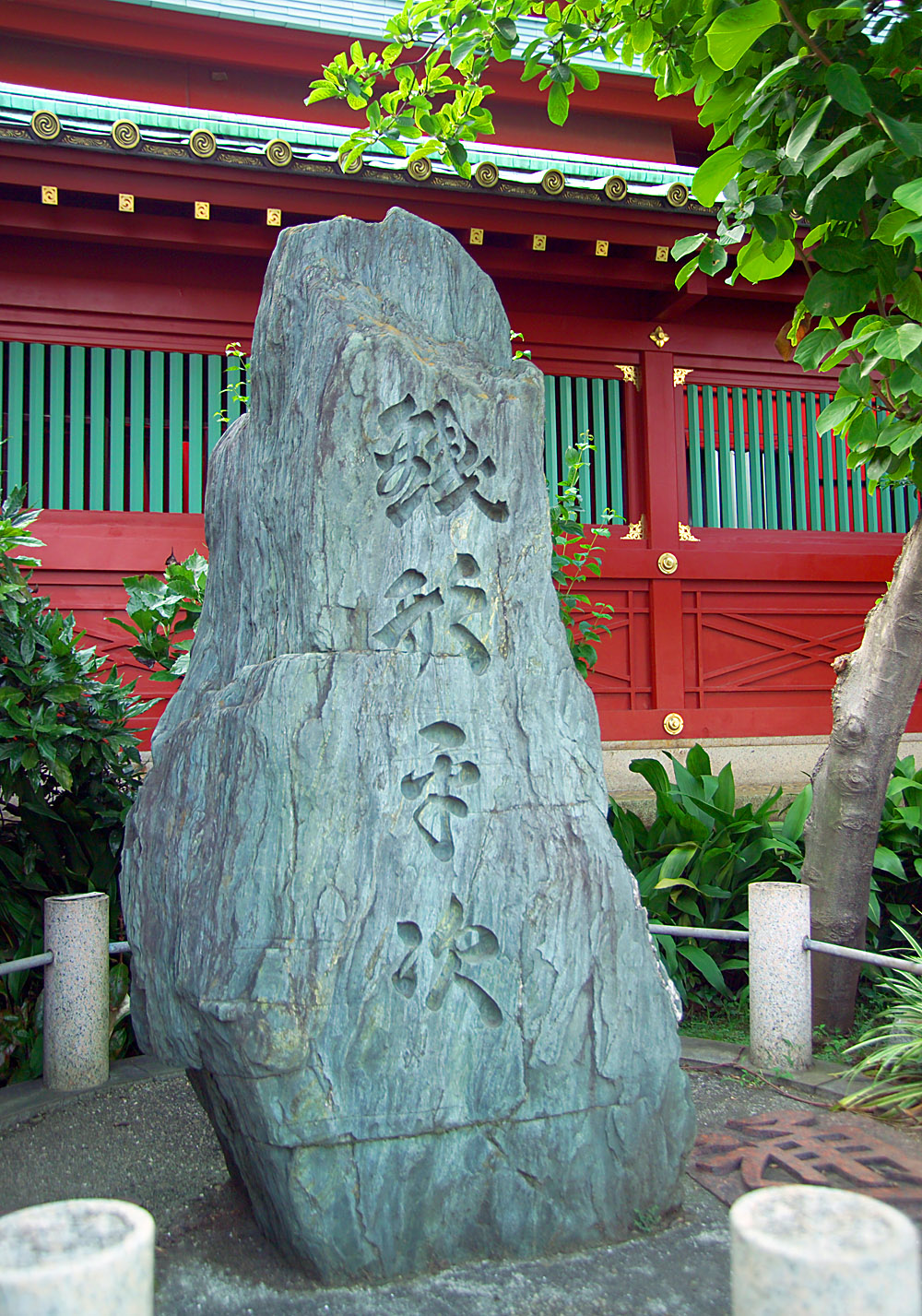
Monument to Zenigata Heiji

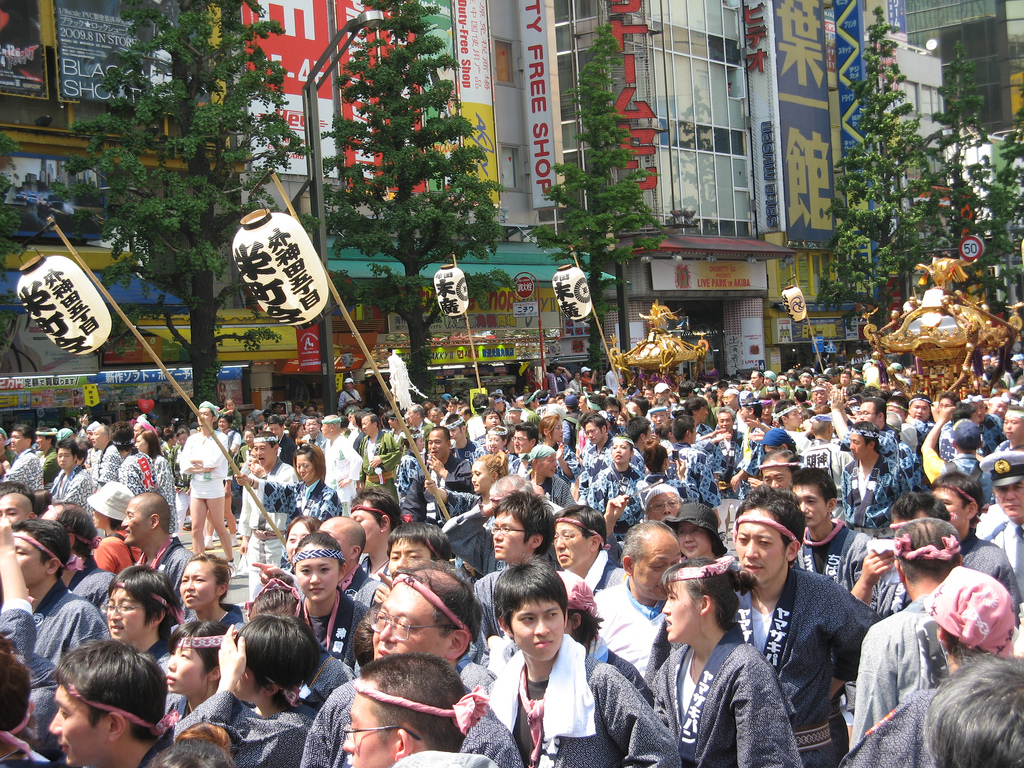
Kanda Matsuri

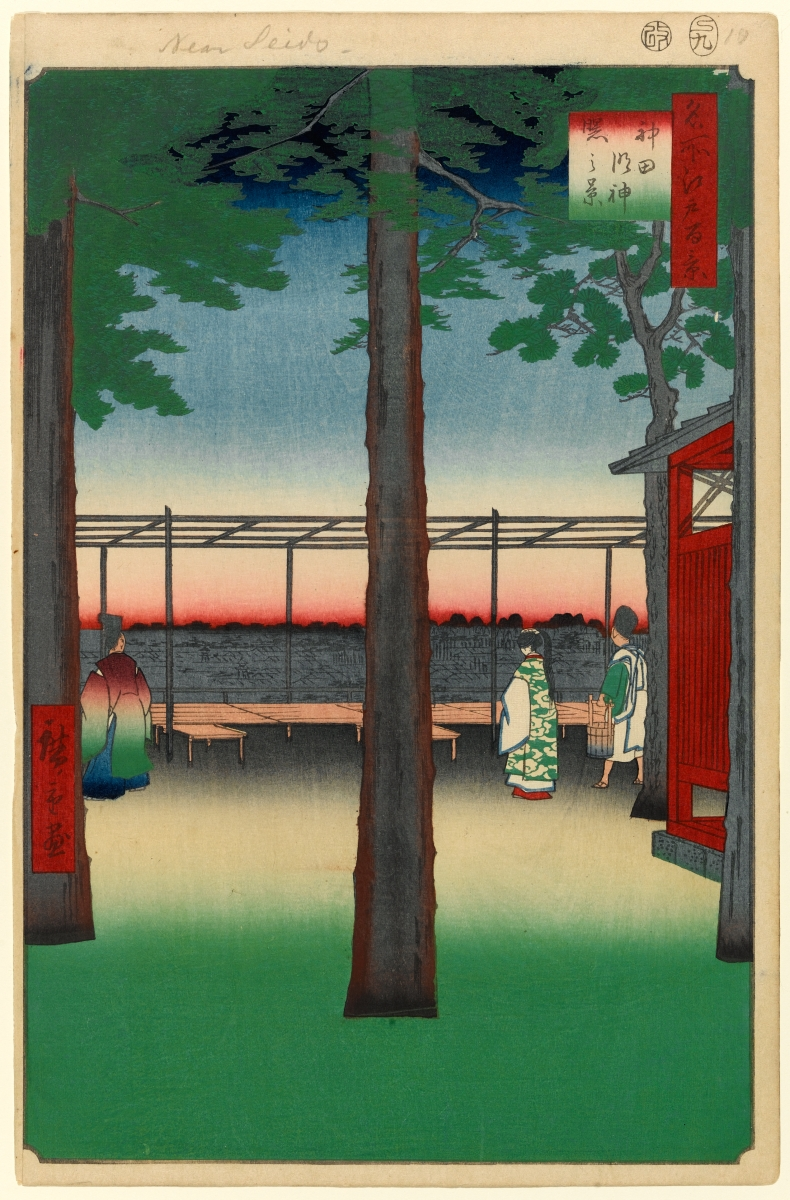
Hiroshige
