= Tawara Tōda Monogatari =

Japanese heroic fairy tale

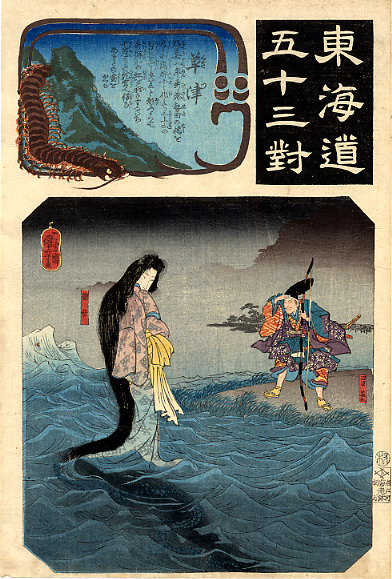
Dragon Woman and Tawara Tōda. Centipede of Mt. Mikami (above). ―Utagawa Kuniyoshi 1845, Tokaidō gojūsantsui: Kusatsu

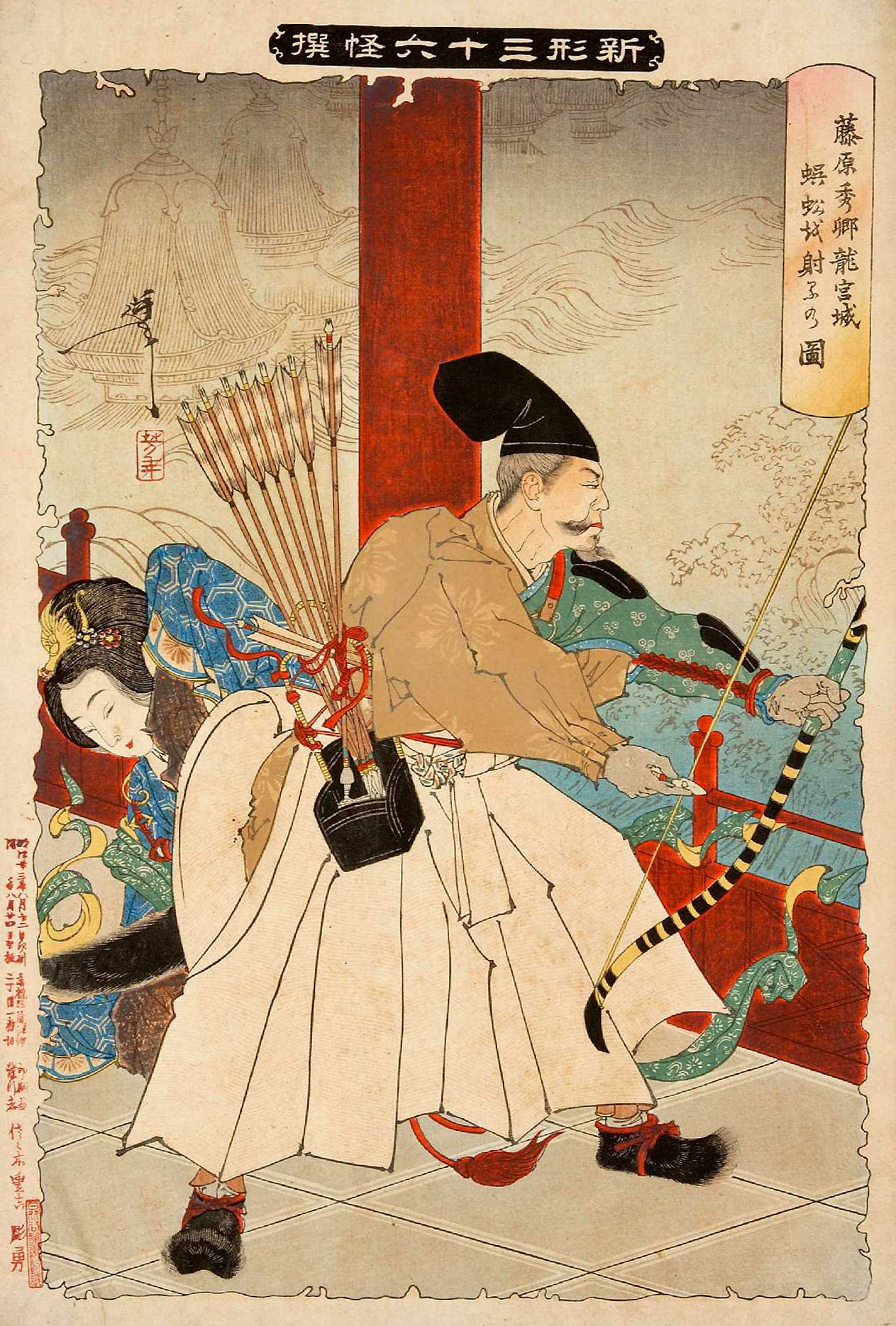
Hidesato aiming his shoot at the giant centipede. ―Tsukioka Yoshitoshi 1890.

The Tale of Tawara Tōda (俵藤太物語, Tawara Tōda monogatari) is a Japanese heroic tale recounting the legendary exploits of Fujiwara no Hidesato. It is part of the otogi-zōshi genre of tales dating to the Edo Period or earlier. Some of the fabulous accounts are also told in the military pseudo-chronicle, Taiheiki (14th century).

Hidesato used a bow and arrow to kill a giant centipede (mukade) wrapped around a mountain near Lake Biwa, fulfilling the request of a serpent at a bridge, which turned out to be a court lady (or Dragon King) from the underwater Ryūgū-jō (龍宮城) "Dragon Palace". The hero was entertained at the palace and received rewards including armor and sword, and an inexhaustible bag of rice. (Note: Or rice sack (tawara).)

"My Lord Bag-O'-Rice" is the English-translated title of Basil Hall Chamberlain's retelling, published as a fairy tale (1887). This was later followed by Yei Theodora Ozaki's translation "My Lord Bag of Rice" (1903) based on Iwaya Sazanami's retelling.

== Setting ==
The story is set in Ōmi Province (Shiga Prefecture), and begins with a large serpent lying on Seta Bridge on the brink of Lake Biwa. The serpent, which later assumes human form, conveys Hidesato to the Dragon Palace, which can be reached through the depths of this Lake.

There is a Shinto shrine near the Seta Bridge at Lake Biwa where people have venerated Tawara Tōda.

== Personage ==
Tawara Tōda (俵藤太; lit. 'Rice-bag Tōda') is a name that plays a pun between tawara meaning 'straw rice-bag; straw barrel' and Tawara (田原), a proper name (which may be a person's name or a place name). It was the nickname given to the historical Fujiwara no Hidesato who flourished in the first half of the 10th century and participated in the suppression of the rebel usurper Taira no Masakado.

The nickname is sometimes styled "Tawara [no] Tōta".

== Summary ==
The hero's centipede-slaying legend as contained in the Tawara Tōda monogatari ("The Tale of Tawara Tōda") was widely circulated and read during the early Edo Period (17th century), when the text was being copied in picture scrolls (emaki) and appearing in Otogizōshi type woodblock-printed (and hand-copied) books. (Note: The Tawara Tōda story is not one of the 23 pieces listed in the more stringent definition of otogizōshi. But it has been printed under the otogizōshi anthology. Araki (1981) also discusses it as an otogizōshi narrative, in the broader sense.) A summary of the monogatari version is as follows:

Fujiwara no Hidesato confronted the large serpent which lay on Seta Bridge in Ōmi Province disrupting travelers. Undaunted by this twelve horned snake measuring 200 feet, the hero stepped on its back and crossed over, continuing onward. That night he was visited by a young woman who declared herself to be the transformation of the serpent. Near Lake Biwa where she lived, a huge centipede took up residence on Mount Mikami, and was devouring beasts and fish and even her own kindred.
Hidesato accepted her plea to eradicate this creature, and went to Seta. When the centipede came slinking down, it appeared as if two or three thousand torches were descending the mountain. Hidesato shot two arrows which failed to lodge, but when he laid spittle on the third arrow and prayed to his patron Hachiman deity it struck a grievous blow. Hidesato approached the creature (Note: Which had a head like an ox-demon (gyūki).) and hacked it to pieces. (Note: Presumably with his heirloom sword which he had brought.)
The dragon woman was elated and gave him magical gifts: undiminishing bolts of silk, inexhaustible rice bag, and a crimson copper pan of plenty (or "pot of alloyed gold and copper"). It was on account of the rice bag (tawara) that Hidesato received the nickname Tawara Tōda. The dragon woman took him to the Dragon-Palace (Ryūgū), where he was entertained and lavished with additional gifts from the Dragon King. (Note: The monogatari version elaborates that this was Sāgara the Dragon King who (in Buddhism) was one of the Eight Great Dragon Kings (among the Eight Legions).) Hidesato was given armor and sword, and a crimson copper bell. Hidesato subsequently donated this bell to Mii-dera temple at the foot of Mount Hiei. (Note: A legend concerning Benkei is attached to the bell. See below.)

The monogatari version probably derives from earlier accounts of Hidesato's centipede slaying described in the 14th-century Taiheiki, expanded with layers of legendary and religious (Buddhist) motifs. The above summary is not the entirety of Tawara Tōda monogatari, which contains a second part where the hero triumphs over Taira no Masakado, despite the latter having an iron body which was invulnerable except at the temples on his head, and having six ghostly doubles of himself.

=== Taiheiki version ===
The 14th-century Taiheiki records a much earlier version of this legend about Hidesato, but instead of the dragon turning into a beautiful woman, it transforms into a "strange small man" – the Dragon King himself. (Note: In the Taiheiki it is not explicit that the "small man" and the "Dragon God" (not "Dragon King" in original text) are the same personage, so this must be inferred. The small man changes into wearing a kanmuri (冠) "crown" but this headdress is worn by various officials, not just the monarch.) And here, Hidesato is invited to the Dragon Palace first and thereafter combats the centipede that attacks the aquatic realm. Here the inexhaustible silk and rice bag are received from the Dragon King, (Note: Rather than the Dragon Woman, as in the monogatari version) but not the copper alloy pan/pot, only the copper temple-bell.

=== Other attestations ===
A version (similar to the monogatari) appears in Honchō kaidan koji (本朝怪談故事) (1711) as pointed out by Dutch Japanologist Marinus Willem de Visser.

The centipede coiled seven and a half turns around Mount Mikami according to popular tradition. An early written mention of this occurs in the area guidebook Ōmi yochi shiryaku (1723).

The name Chikushi (遅来矢) has been ascribed to the sword given by the Dragon King in the Wakan sansai zue encyclopedia (1712) and the Tōkaidō meisho zue almanac (1797). (Note: This sword was passed down the line in the Akahori clan, these sources add.)

Hidesato's alleged armor from the Dragon Palace bore the similarly scripted name Hiraishi (避来矢) according to the Ujisatoki (before 1713). (Note: This armor was passed down Sano clan of Shimotsuke Province, the Ujisatoki adds.) Hiraishi (平石), an armor with the same-sounding but differently written name, is listed as a gift of Dragon Palace in Arai Hakuseki's Honchō gunkikō (1709); this work mentions a second armor Muromaru (室丸) being obtained as well.

Although not an attestation of the entire story, a sword named Mukadegiri (蚣切) "Centipede-cutter" purportedly owned by Hidesato according to the inscription borne on its tang was bequeathed to the Ise Shrine. The Ise Shrine (Chōkokan Museum) also houses a kenuki gata or "tweezer type" that allegedly belonged to Hidesato. (Note: The Chōkokan Museum editors surmised that this particular kenuki gata sword (Ise) was the very sword that was heirloom to the Akahori clan, to which was attached the legend of it being the gift of the Dragon Palace.)

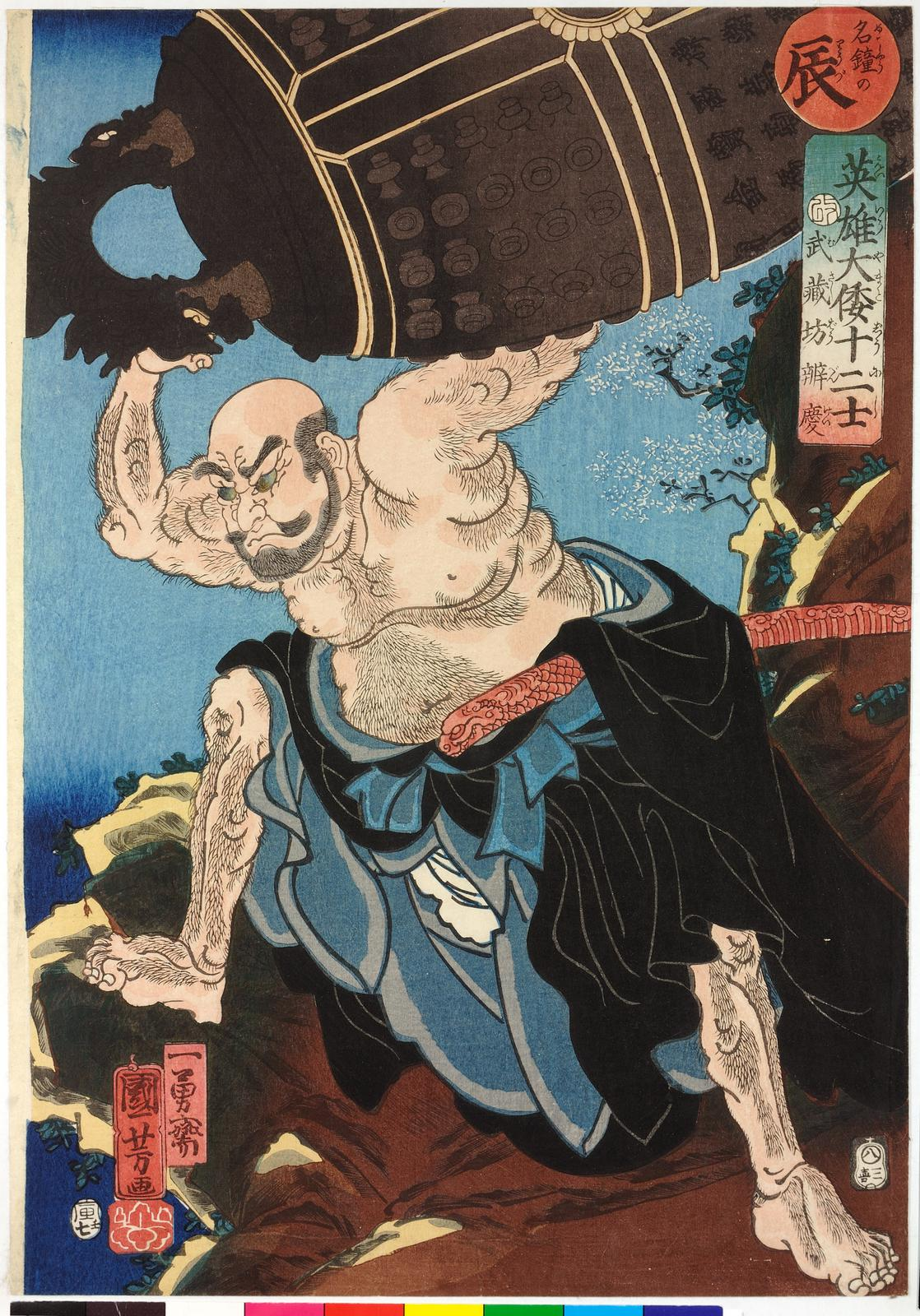
Benkei dragging the bell

There is a legendary incident concerning the bell donated by Tawara Tōda to Mii-dera', which was serving as the bonshō-bell to tell the hour. It happened centuries later, when Musashibō Benkei captured and dragged it up the mountain to Eizan (Enryaku-ji), but the bell failed to toll properly. Thus the bell has been returned and has so remained at the rightful temple.

=== Fairy tale translations ===
An English version of the tale entitled "My Lord Bag-O'-Rice" (1887) was translated by Basil Hall Chamberlain, and published as Japanese Fairy Tale Series No. 15 by Hasegawa Takejirō.

An otogibanashi (Japanese fairy tale) version entitled "Tawara Tōda" (「俵藤太」), retold by Iwaya Sazanami appeared in the 1890s. Subsequently, "My Lord Bag of Rice" was included in Japanese Fairy Tales (1903) anthologized by Yei Theodora Ozaki. Ozaki's version is a retelling based on the rendition by "Sadanami sanjin", the misspelled alias of Iwaya Sazanami. Ozaki's book was illustrated by Kakuzō Fujiyama. Iwaya's version of several fairy tales were later collected, and Hannah Riddell's translation, "Tawara Toda Hidesato (Hidesato of the Rice Bale)".

"My Lord Bag of Rice" is also found in A Book of Dragons (1965) by Ruth Manning-Sanders, illustrated by Robin Jacques.
