= Takiyasha the Witch and the Skeleton Spectre =

Triptych print by Utagawa Kuniyoshi

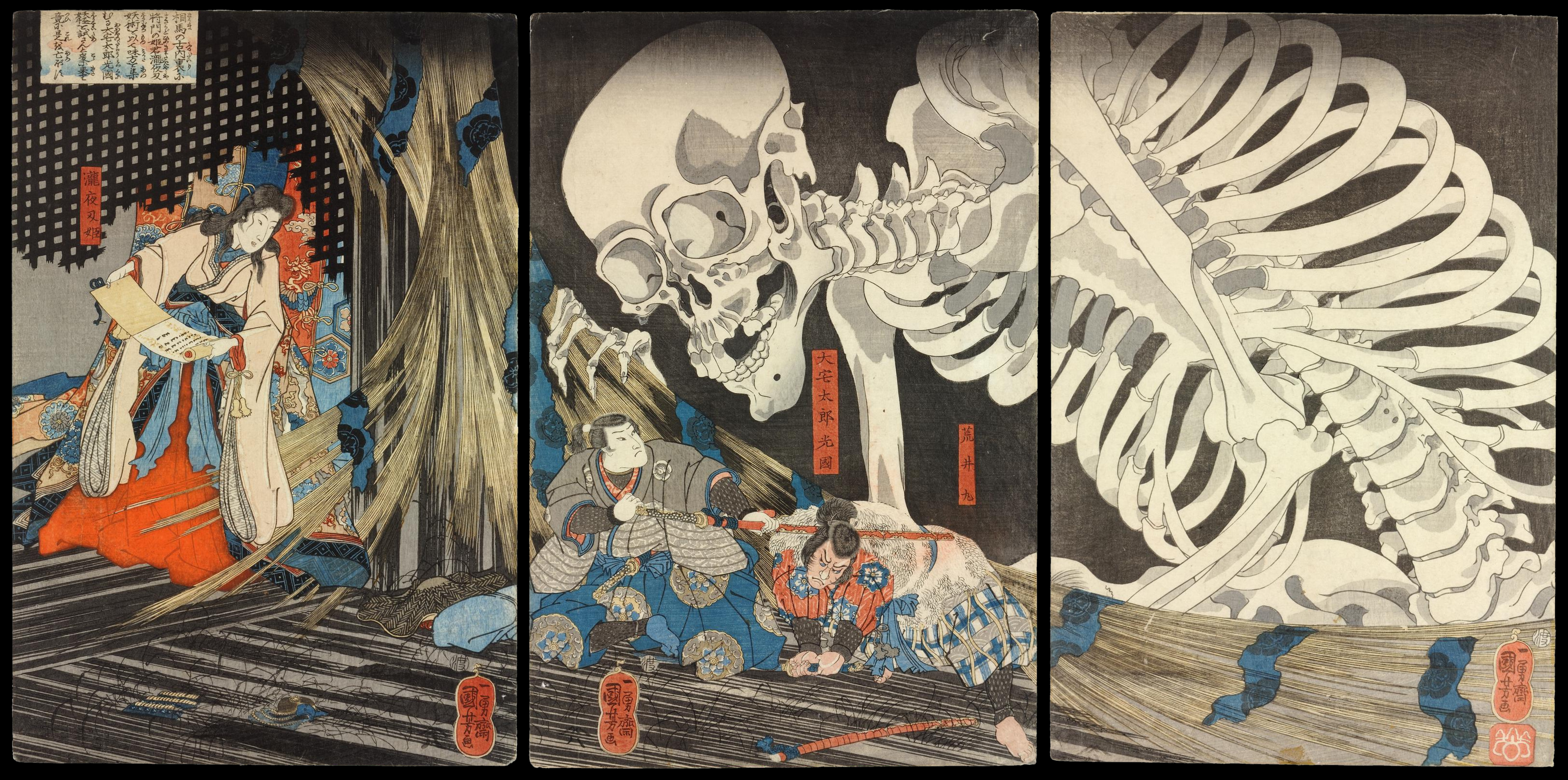
Triptych of Takiyasha the Witch and the Skeleton Spectre, c. 1844, Utagawa Kuniyoshi (1797–1861), British Museum no. 1915,0823,0.915-916

Takiyasha the Witch and the Skeleton Spectre or Mitsukuni Defying the Skeleton Spectre Invoked by Princess Takiyasha (Japanese: 相馬の古内裏 妖怪がしゃどくろと戦う大宅太郎光圀) is an ukiyo-e woodblock triptych by Japanese artist Utagawa Kuniyoshi (1798–1861). Kuniyoshi was known for his depictions of historical and mythical scenes, and combined both in portraying the tenth-century princess Takiyasha summoning a skeleton spectre to frighten Ōya no Mitsukuni.

In the image, the princess recites a spell written on a handscroll, summoning a giant skeleton. It rears out of a black void, crashing its way through the tattered palace blinds with its bony fingers to menace Mitsukuni and his companion.

In Japan, the artwork is on display in the city of Kurashiki at the UKIYO-E museum. A copy of the print is housed in the Honolulu Museum of Art in the United States, having been donated by its previous owner, Victor S. K. Houston, in 1941.

== Historical context ==
The historical Princess Takiyasha was the daughter of the provincial warlord Taira no Masakado of Sōma, who tried to set up an "Eastern Court" in Shimōsa Province in competition with the emperor in Heian-kyō (modern Kyoto). That rebellion was put down in the year 939 and he was defeated, then decapitated. After his death, Princess Takiyasha continued living in the ruined shōen, or rural manor-house, of the Sōma clan, Masakado's former residence.

This print shows a mythical episode in which the emperor's official, Mitsukuni, comes to search for surviving insurrectionary conspirators.

== See also ==
- Toyohara Chikanobu, a later ukiyo-e artist of the Meiji period who designed another print of Princess Takiyasha
- Gashadokuro, a mythical creature whose popular depiction was based on this print

== Bibliography ==
- Jackson, Anna, ed. (2001). V&A: A Hundred Highlights. V&A Publications.
