= Ōmukade =

Yōkai

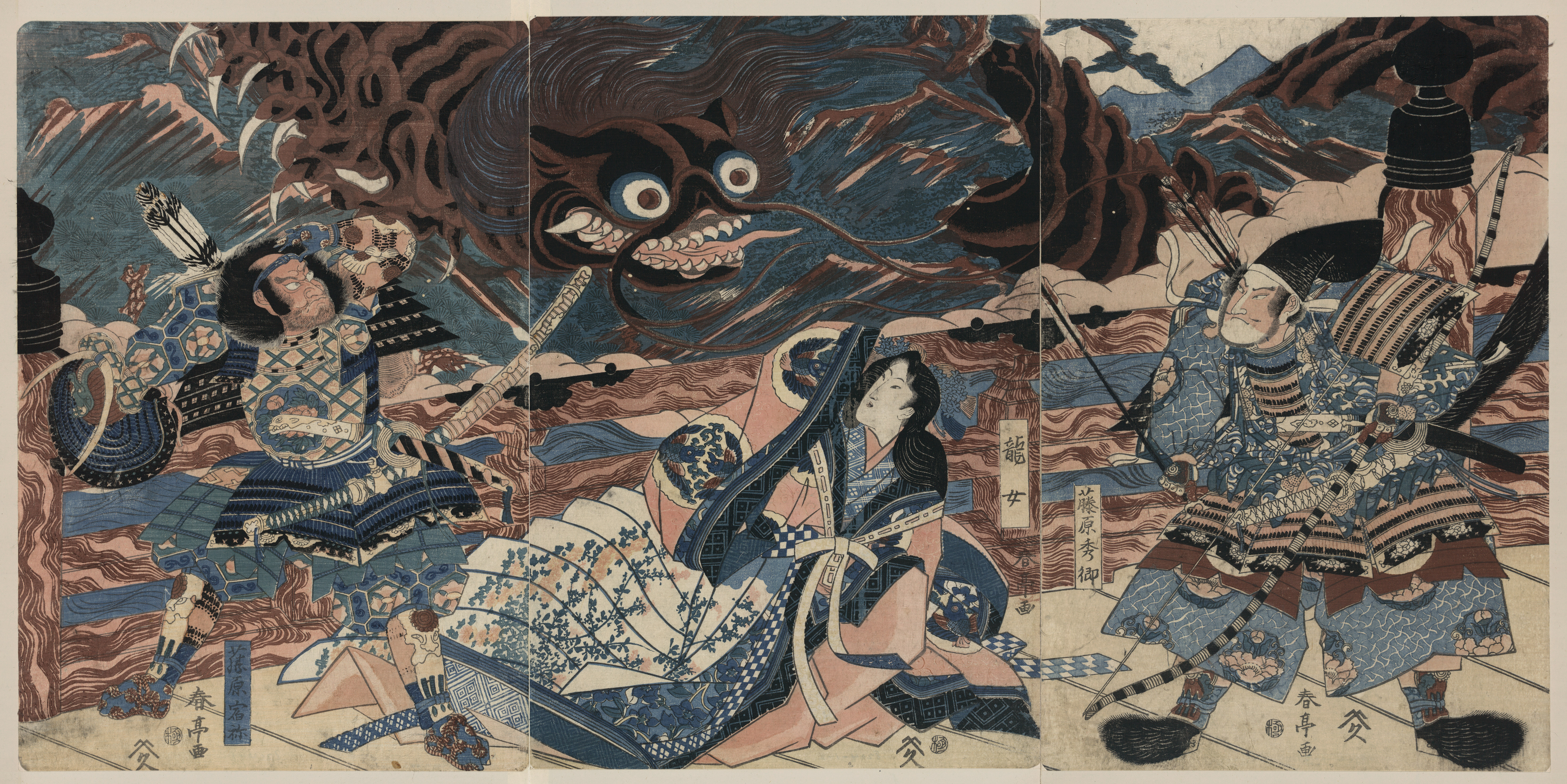
Painting depicting Fujiwara no Hidesato with the Ōmukade at Lake Biwa.

Ōmukade (大百足, おおむかで, "giant centipede") is a yōkai in Japanese mythology.

== Legend ==
The Ōmukade is a giant man-eating centipede that lives in the mountains. While it eats humans, the Ōmukade has a weakness to human saliva. It also preys on great serpents and dragons.

A giant centipede or mukade was killed near Lake Biwa by Fujiwara no Hidesato (aka Tawara Tōda Hidesato, "Rice bag Tōda") according to the legendary tale Tawara Tōda Monogatari. While crossing the bridge over the lake, (Note: Seta Bridge of Ōmi Province.) Tawara was besought by a giant serpent to avenge the killer of her sons and grandsons. (Note: The serpent may have been the transformation of the lady of the Dragon Palace where he is invited, or a messenger of hers. In a variant telling, the serpent transforms into a small-bodied man.) This centipede made its lair at Mount Mikami nearby. Tawara shot two ineffective arrows, but the third arrow smeared with his saliva proved lethal.

== Popular culture ==
- Different adaptions of Ōmukade appear in the Super Sentai franchise:
  - In Ninja Sentai Kakuranger, the Ōmukade has a football-theme to it. In Season 3 of Mighty Morphin Power Rangers, it was adapted into Centiback.
  - In Shuriken Sentai Ninninger, the Ōmukade is the result of a Sealing Shuriken coming in contact with a power strip. This monster has energy-eating abilities. In Power Rangers Ninja Steel, it was adapted into Voltipede.
- The Ōmukade appear in Inuyasha franchise:
  - In Inuyasha the Ōmukade named Mistress Centipede. In episode 1, she has been revived by the Shikon Jewel and kidnapped Kagome from the modern era and traveled through time to the feudal era and has been killed by Inuyasha, and in episode 147, the demon slayers have discovered that Mistress Centipede had been asleep at Midoriko's cave since she had the Shikon Jewel until it was removed by Sango's grandfather Shako, she was killed but revived the jewel. During the night of the new moon, she was going to find the jewel that it's nearby as she'll increase her demonic power again before her body fails her. She's going to attempt to take young Kaede hostage and take the jewel from Kikyō but was killed by Inuyasha for the first time. Kikyō acknowledged that as long as Mistress Centipede's body was near the jewel she would resurrect to no end. Kikyō had her followers collect all remains of this fearsome demon and throw it down the Bone-Eater's Well, so that the power of the Shikon no Tama would not be able to revive her again.
  - In Yashahime: Princess Half-Demon, the Ōmukade named Mistress Three-Eyes. In The Three Princesses, she took red and gold Rainbow Pearls from Moroha and Setsuna until they were sucked by the portal. In The Dream Butterfly, she had failed to take the silver Rainbow Pearl and has been killed by Setsuna.
- In Sekiro: Shadows Die Twice, the titular protagonist relies on the Mortal Blade nodachi to slay the Ōmukade that infests certain immortal entities.
- In Yo-kai Watch, the Ōmukade has the ability to make anyone it inspirits into becoming easily ticked off and burst into angry rants. His name in the English dub is Irewig.
- In One-Punch Man, the Elder Centipede is based on Ōmukade
- In Pokémon Sword and Shield, Centiskorch along with its Gigantamax form are based on the Ōmukade.
- In Ghost of Tsushima, the name “Omukade’s Revenge” is given to one of the game’s cosmetic skins that changes the appearance of the scabbards and hilts of the protagonist’s katana and tanto.
- In Touhou Kouryuudou ~ Unconnected Marketeers, the extra stage boss Momoyo Himemushi is an Ōmukade.
- In Nioh, the Ōmukade is a boss that is referred to as the Great Centipede.

== See also ==
- Arthropleura
- Skolopendra, a Sea Monster of Greek mythology that is often imagined or visualized as a massive centipede-like creature
