= Taira no Takamochi =

Japanese nobleman (fl.889)

Taira no Takamochi 平高望
- Born: Prince Takamochi; Unknown
- Died: Unknown
- Occupations: Royal, nobleman, feudal lord
- Known for: Establishing the Taira clan

Taira no Takamochi (平 高望; born Prince Takamochi (高望王)) was a member of the Imperial Family of Japan who was demoted to nobility in the Heian period. He subsequently founded the Taira clan and the Kanmu Heishi lineage of the clan, and became a feudal lord.

== Life ==
Prince Takamochi was born as the son of Prince Takami, the third prince of Prince Kazurawara, and Tachibana no Harunari. Takamochi was the great-grandson of Emperor Kanmu, who reigned from 781 to 806.

He was granted the court rank of Junior Fifth Rank, Lower Grade and served as Vice Governor (suke kokushi) of Kazusa Province.

On May 13, 889, Takamochi was granted the surname Taira, thus establishing the Kanmu Heishi line of the Taira clan. This line proved to be the strongest and most dominant line during the Heian period.

Even after his retirement, he stayed in Kazusa Province and became a powerful figure in the Kantō region as a feudal lord, privately owning vast rice fields.

== Genealogy ==
Taira no Korihira, a great-grandson of Takamochi, moved to Ise Province (currently part of Mie Prefecture) and established an important Daimyo dynasty.

Later, the Kanmu Heishi lineage had many branches, including Hōjō, Chiba, Miura and Hatakeyama clans.

== Family ==
- Father: Prince Takami
- Mother: Tachibana no Harunari
- Wife: Fujiwara no Yoshikata's daughter
  - Eldest son: Taira no Kunika
  - Second son: Taira no Yoshikane
  - Third son: Taira no Yoshimasa
  - Son: Taira no Yoshiyori
- Concubine
  - Son: Taira no Yoshifumi
- Unknown mother
  - Son: Taira no Yoshihiro
  - Son: Taira no Yoshimochi
  - Son: Taira no Yoshimasa
  - Daughter: Fujiwara no Korechiyo's wife, Fujiwara no Tamenori's mother
