= Taira no Masakado =

Japanese Heian period samurai (died 940)

- 平将門
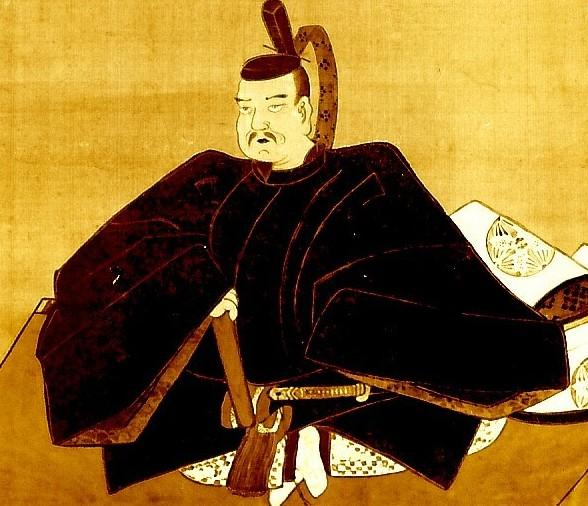
- Portrait of Masakado formerly kept at Tsukudo Shrine (築土神社) in Chiyoda, Tokyo. The original painting was destroyed in 1945.
- Born: Unknown; c. early 900s?
- Died: 14th day of the 2nd month, Tengyō 3 (March 25, 940); Shimōsa Province (modern Bandō, Ibaraki Prefecture)
- Resting place: Masakado-zuka, Ōtemachi, Tokyo (head); Enmei-in, Bandō, Ibaraki (body)
- Other names: Taira no Kojirō Masakado (平小次郎将門); Sōma no Kojirō (相馬小次郎)
- Known for: Rebelling against the central government
- Children: Yoshikado; Masakuni; Haruhime (Nyoshun-ni); Nyozō-ni (Jizō-ni); Takiyashahime (Satsukihime)
- Parents: Taira no Yoshimasa / Yoshimochi (father); daughter of Agata Inukai no Harue (mother)

Taira no Masakado (平 将門; Japanese pronunciation: [tä́ì.ɾä̀ nò̞ | mä̀.ꜜsä́.kä́.dó̞, -nò̞ mä̀.sä̀.kä̀.dò̞]; died March 25, 940) was a Heian period provincial magnate (gōzoku) and samurai based in eastern Japan, notable for leading the first recorded uprising against the central government in Kyōto. Along with Sugawara no Michizane and Emperor Sutoku, he is often called one of the "Three Great Onryō of Japan".

== Early life ==
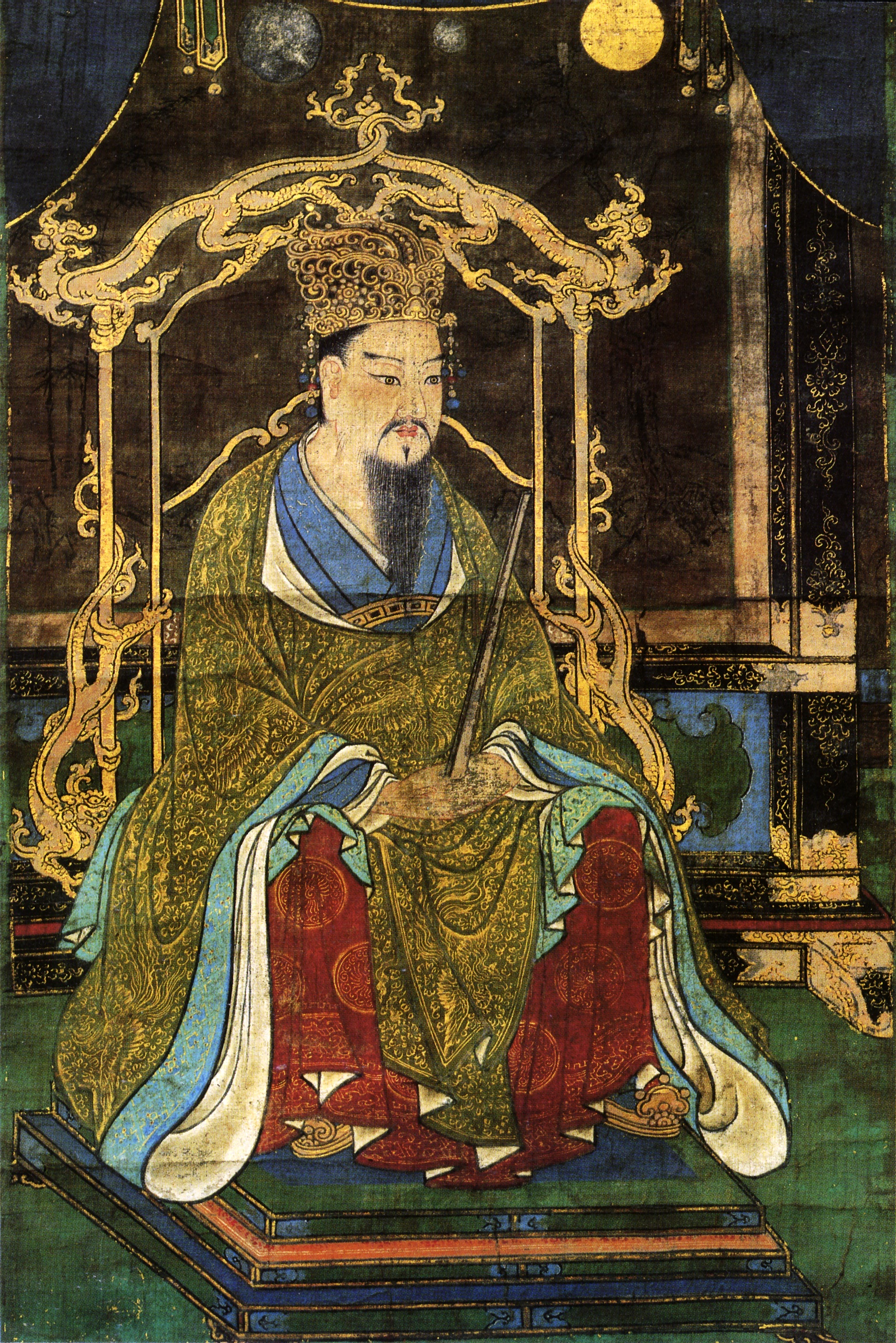
Kanmu, 50th emperor of Japan. The branch of the Taira clan (Heishi) to which Masakado belonged, the Kanmu Heishi (桓武平氏), traces itself from Kanmu's children who were not considered eligible for the throne.

Masakado was one of the sons of Taira no Yoshimasa (平良将), also known as Taira no Yoshimochi (平良持), (Note: While some texts such as the Azuma Kagami and the Sonpi Bunmyaku give the name of Masakado's father as 'Yoshimasa' (良将), others such as the Fusō Ryakuki and the Konjaku Monogatarishū instead identify him as 'Yoshimochi' (良持). Rather confusingly, some texts suggest that Yoshimochi's elder brother Kunika (国香) was originally the one named 'Yoshimochi'. Some sources reconcile this discrepancy by suggesting that the two brothers changed their names at some point.) of the Kanmu Taira clan (Kanmu Heishi), descendants of Emperor Kanmu (reigned 781–806) who were demoted from princely to commoner status and granted the Taira surname. Yoshimochi (Note: To prevent confusion with Yoshimochi's nephew or younger brother Yoshimasa (平良正, the kanji for masa in this name, 正, is different from that of Masakado's father, which is 将), this article will refer to the former as 'Yoshimochi' throughout.) was one of the sons of Prince Takamochi, a grandson or great-grandson of Kanmu who was appointed the vice-governor of Kazusa Province (modern central Chiba Prefecture) in 889 (Kanpyō 1). Takamochi's sons who joined him there occupied a variety of provincial offices in the eastern part of the country such as that of chinjufu shōgun, the commander-in-chief of the defense garrison (chinjufu) in Mutsu Province tasked with subjugating the Emishi peoples of the north.

Not much is known of Masakado's birth and early life due to lack of written evidence. The genealogical record Sonpi Bunmyaku (compiled 1377–1395) identifies Masakado as the third of Yoshimochi's eight sons, while the genealogy of the Sōma clan (an offshoot of the Chiba clan, who were descended from Masakado's uncle Yoshifumi), the Sōma Keizu (相馬系図), identifies him as the second of seven sons. The latter text also claims that he was nicknamed Sōma no Kojirō (相馬小次郎, Kojirō meaning "little second son") during his childhood, suggesting that he was raised in the district of Sōma (相馬郡) in Shimōsa Province (part of modern southwest Ibaraki Prefecture and northwest Chiba Prefecture), though the factuality of this information has been disputed. Masakado's mother is sometimes identified as the daughter of a certain Agata (no) Inukai no Harue (県犬養春枝), perhaps a local magnate from Sōma District.

Masakado's year of birth is also unclear. Accounts of his exploits in the mid-930s suggest that his children were young enough to be still in the care of their mother, which may imply that he was born sometime around 900. Later legend portrays Masakado as the reincarnation of scholar and politician Sugawara no Michizane (later deified as the god Tenjin), who died in 903 (Engi 3).

At some point in his late teens, Masakado went to the capital city of Heian-kyō (Kyōto) and served in the household of the imperial regent Fujiwara no Tadahira. He is said to have aspired for a position within the imperial police force, the Kebiishi, but failed to obtain court rank or any significant office in spite of his credentials and his patron's high status.

== The Jōhei-Tengyō Rebellion ==
=== Beginning of hostilities (931–936) ===
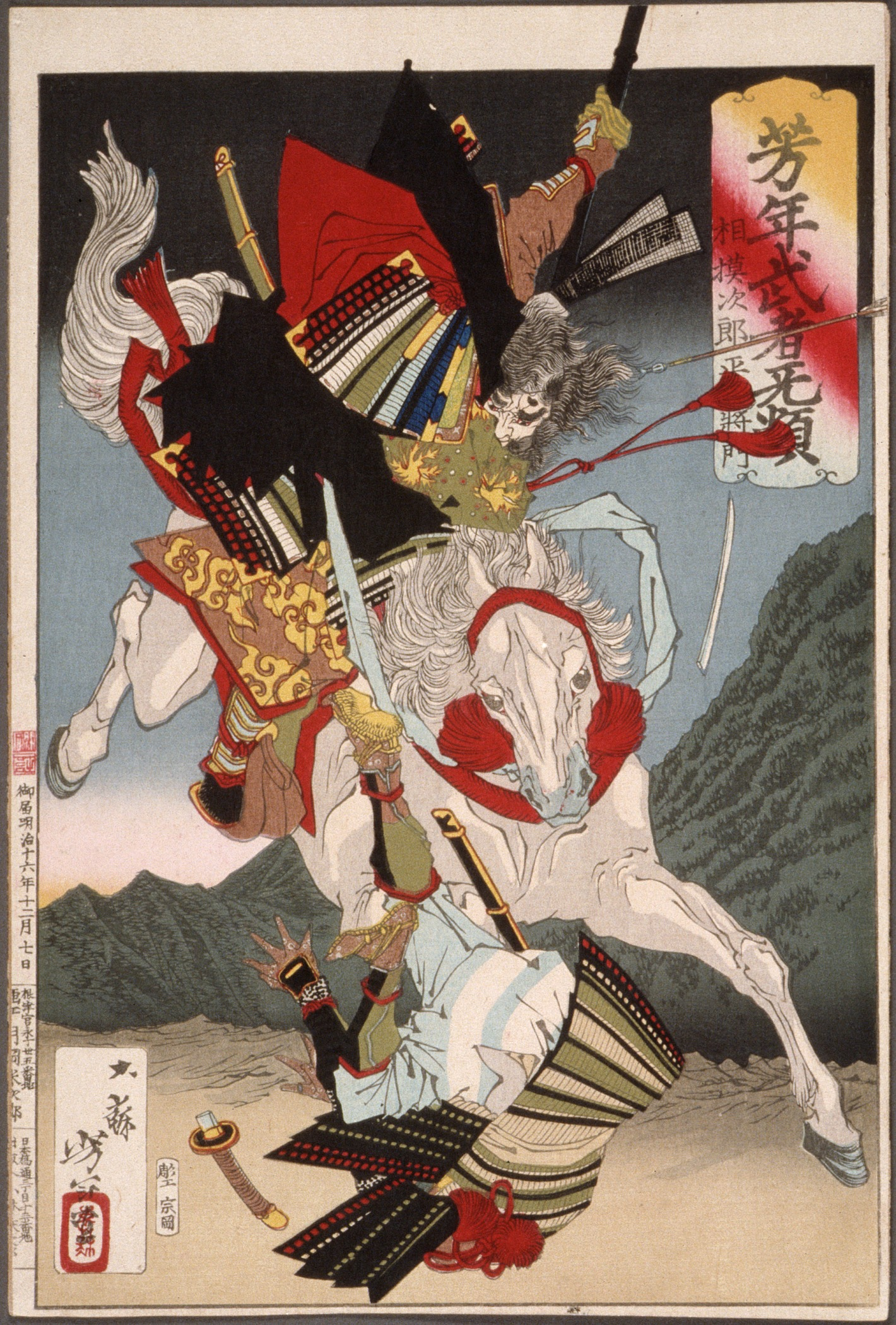
Masakado attacking an opponent on horseback (Yoshitoshi)

Disagreement exists about the exact cause of Masakado's rebellion. While some sources portray the uprising as revenge for his failure to secure a government post, the Shōmonki (将門記; also read as Masakadoki), an anonymous monograph on Masakado's life believed to have been completed as early as the 940s, suggests that the conflict originally began in 931 (Jōhei 1) as a dispute between Masakado, freshly returned from Heian-kyō, and his paternal uncle Taira no Yoshikane (平良兼) over a woman. The identity of this woman is uncertain, though one theory suggests that it may have been a daughter of Yoshikane who married her cousin and apparently went to live with him against her father's wishes. (Aristocratic marriages during the Heian period were usually matrilocal; the wife continued to reside with her parents while the husband either moved in with his wife's family or simply visited her.) Besides this affront to his honor, Masakado not obtaining any post or rank in the capital might have been another factor in Yoshikane's opposition to the marriage. Another theory based on folk tradition meanwhile suggests that Masakado and Yoshikane quarreled over a daughter of Minamoto no Mamoru (源護), former senior secretary (大掾, daijō) of Hitachi Province who had married off his daughters to Masakado's uncles, Yoshikane among them.

On the other hand, the Konjaku Monogatarishū (c. 1120) gives another reason for the conflict, namely that Masakado's uncles had appropriated the lands the young man was supposed to inherit from his late father. Masakado's uncle Taira no Kunika (平国香), who as Takamochi's eldest son was the head of the clan, might have tried to take over his younger brother Yoshimochi's property and place it under his control. Kunika, like Yoshikane, was related by marriage ties to Mamoru, who would eventually become involved in the conflict.

In the 2nd month of 935 (Jōhei 5), Masakado and his men were ambushed by Mamoru's three sons, Tasuku, Takashi, and Shigeru, at a place called Nomoto (野本) in the district of Makabe (真壁郡), near the border between Hitachi and Shimōsa (modern Chikusei, Ibaraki), but managed to repel their attack; the three brothers all died in the battle. In retaliation, Masakado then burned and ransacked the houses of Tasuku's supporters across southwestern Hitachi. Kunika also died during this conflict, under circumstances not entirely clear: he may have either been killed during the skirmish at Nomoto or when Masakado set fire to his residence.

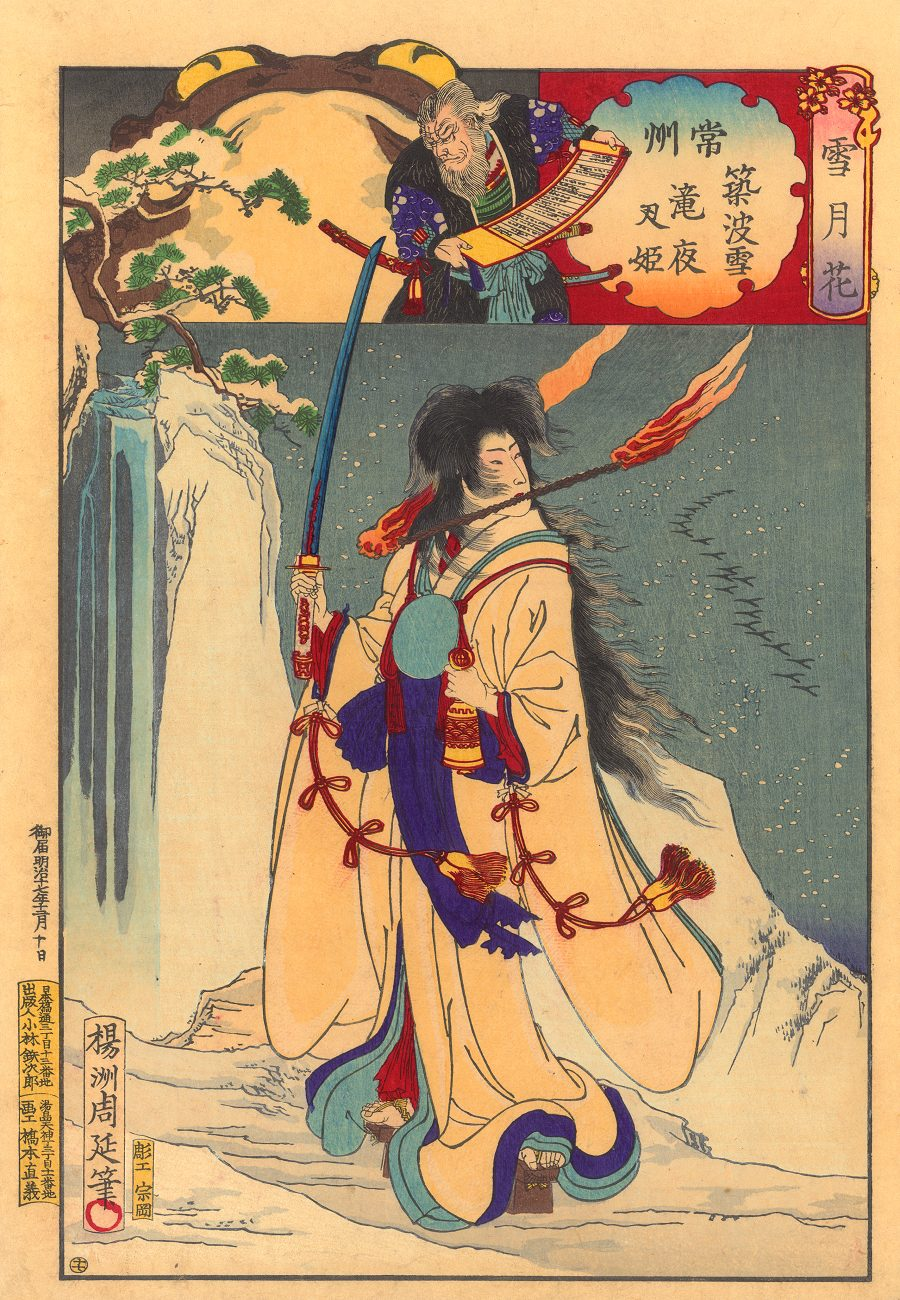
Takiyasha-hime, the sorceress, is shown carrying a sword in one hand, a bell in the other, and a torch in her mouth; the toad, her familiar, is shown in the inset with her father, Taira no Masakado. Ukiyo-e woodblock print by Yōshū Chikanobu, 1884.

On the 21st day of the 10th month of the same year, Taira no Yoshimasa (平良正), Masakado's paternal uncle or cousin who was also related by marriage to Mamoru, seeking to avenge the deaths of Kunika and Mamoru's sons, faced Masakado in battle in the village of Kawawa (川曲村) in western Hitachi (identified with the town of Yachiyo, Ibaraki) but Masakado once again proved the victor; more than sixty of Yoshikane's men were killed while the rest dispersed.

After his humiliating defeat, Yoshimasa called to Yoshikane – now the vice-governor of Kazusa Province – for aid, who then gathered a large number of warriors from Kazusa and Shimōsa such that officials from the two provinces initially attempted to prevent their dispatch (Such protests were later withdrawn after the issue was deemed to be a private matter beyond the sphere of state affairs). On the 26th day of the 6th month of 936 (Jōhei 6), Yoshikane led his massive army to Hitachi, where he joined forces with Yoshimasa and Kunika's son Sadamori (who had been in the capital when his father was killed and initially took a neutral stance), whom he had prevailed upon to take part in the attack against Masakado. They made contact at the border between Hitachi and Shimotsuke (modern Tochigi Prefecture) with Masakado, who went there to verify reports about a plan to launch a joint attack on him from the north. Despite only having about a hundred poorly-equipped soldiers with him, Masakado inflicted heavy casualties upon his enemies' several thousand strong army. Scattered and thrown into confusion, Yoshikane and the remnants of his forces fled to the provincial headquarters of Shimotsuke, Masakado pursuing them. Although he managed to surround his uncle in the governmental offices, Masakado, seemingly concerned about subsequent censure should he kill Yoshikane then and there, allowed him to escape through a gap in his western line. He then filed a formal grievance with the provincial authorities in neighboring provinces before returning to his territory.

Not long after his victory, Masakado received a summons from the imperial court because of a complaint lodged against him by Minamoto no Mamoru over the battle at Nomoto. Masakado then hurried to the capital to give an account of himself; his lord, Fujiwara no Tadahira, probably intervened in the case and helped lighten his punishment. He was eventually pardoned early the following year (937 / Jōhei 7) when a general amnesty was declared at the occasion of Emperor Suzaku's coming of age (genpuku).

=== Masakado and Yoshikane (937–938) ===
Anxious to avenge his defeat, Yoshikane almost immediately recommenced hostilities upon Masakado's return. He first launched an attack on Masakado at the Kogai River near the border between Shimōsa and Hitachi while displaying portraits of Yoshimochi and Takamochi (Masakado's father and grandfather) in front of his vanguard. This ploy succeeded in weakening the morale of Masakado and his men, who "withdrew, carrying their shields." (Shōmonki) Afterwards, Yoshikane burned a critical stable and some houses at Masakado's base in Toyoda District in Shimōsa to weaken his ability to make war. Masakado launched a counterattack some days later, but was again defeated due to being struck by a severe pain in his legs (thought to be due to beriberi). During his retreat, Masakado had his wife (Yoshikane's daughter) and children flee by boat for their safety, but Yoshikane discovered them and carried them off to Kazusa. The woman's brothers eventually allowed them to escape back to Masakado.

=== Death ===
In 939 (Tengyō 2, 12th month), Masakado led a minor rebellion which is also known as Tengyō no Ran. The armed struggle began when Masakado led an attack on an outpost of the central government in Hitachi Province, capturing the governor. In December of that year, he conquered Shimotsuke and Kōzuke Provinces; and he claimed the title of Shinnō (New Emperor).

The central government in Kyoto responded by putting a bounty on his head, and fifty-nine days later his cousin Taira no Sadamori, whose father Masakado had attacked and killed, and Fujiwara no Hidesato, killed him at the Battle of Kojima (Shimōsa Province) in 940 and took his head to the capital.

== Aftermath ==
The head found its way to Shibasaki, a small fishing village on the edge of the Pacific Ocean and the future site of Edo, which later became Tokyo. It was buried. The kubizuka, or grave, which is located in the present day Ōtemachi section of Tokyo, was on a hill rising out of Tokyo Bay at the time. Through land reclamation over the centuries, the bay has receded some three kilometers to the south.

== Deification ==
According to legend, when Masakado was preparing for his revolt, a vast swarm of butterflies appeared in Kyoto, a portent of the upcoming battle.

Over the centuries, Masakado became a demigod to the locals who were impressed by his stand against the central government, while at the same time feeling the need to appease his onryō (vengeful spirit). The fortunes of Edo and Tokyo seemed to wax and wane correspondingly with the respect paid to the shrine built to him at the kubizuka (ja); neglect would be followed by natural disasters and other misfortunes. Hence, to this day, the shrine is well maintained, occupying some of the most expensive land in the world in Tokyo's financial district facing the Imperial Palace. His tomb (which contains only a monument to his head) is near exit C5 of Tokyo's Ōtemachi subway station.

Other shrines which he is deity of include Kanda Shrine (神田明神, Kanda-myōjin) (located in Kanda), and Tsukudo Jinja (which has multiple locations).

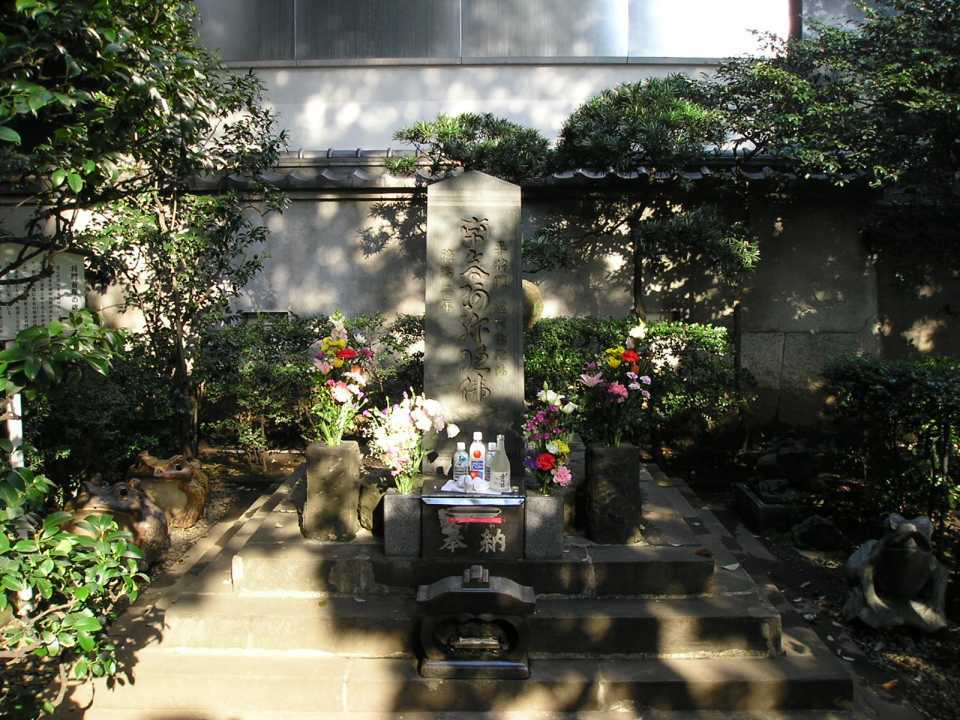
The legendary final resting place of Taira no Masakado's head near the Tokyo Imperial Palace

In Gifu Prefecture, there is a Mikubi shrine (ja) dedicated to Taira no Masakado. According to a legend left at the Shinto shrine, a priest at a shrine in Mino Province prayed to a kami (Shinto deity) to prevent the head of Taira no Masakado, who was beheaded in Kyoto, from returning to Kantō for revenge, and the kami shot the head off with a yumi (bow) as Taira no Masakado flew back to Kantō. The Mikubi Shrine was built on the spot where the head fell.

== In popular culture ==
- The Soma Nomaoi (相馬野馬追) horse-riding festival organized by Taira no Masakado is still celebrated today.
- Taira no Masakado is featured in the historical fiction novels of Yoshikawa Eiji.
- Chōgorō Kaionji's novels Taira no Masakado and Umi to Kaze to Niji to.
- Kaze to Kumo to Niji to, a Japanese TV drama based on the novels of Chōgorō Kaionji, chronicles the life of Taira no Masakado.
- Teito Monogatari, a historical fantasy novel by Hiroshi Aramata providing a speculative retelling of the history of Tokyo in which the curse of Masakado influences the development of the city.
- In the Nintendo DS game Ganbare Goemon: Tōkai Dōchū Ōedo Tengu ri Kaeshi no Maki, players meet the ghost of Masakado and must retrieve his kabuto helmet to progress the story.
- Masakado appears in several games in the Megami Tensei franchise.

== See also ==
- Chiba clan
- Fujiwara no Sumitomo, rebellious leader of the same time
- Myōken

== Bibliography ==
- Friday, Karl F. (2008). The First Samurai: the Life & Legend of the Warrior Rebel Taira Masakado New York: John Wiley and Sons. ISBN 047176082X; ISBN 978-0471760825
- Nussbaum, Louis Frédéric and Käthe Roth. (2005). Japan Encyclopedia. Cambridge: Harvard University Press. ISBN 978-0-674-01753-5; OCLC 48943301
- (in Japanese) Yoshikawa, Eiji. (1989) Yoshikawa Eiji Rekishi Jidai Bunko (Eiji Yoshikawa's Historical Fiction), Vol. 46: Taira no Masakado (平の将門). Tokyo: Kodansha. ISBN 978-4-06-196577-5
- Waley, P. Tokyo Now & Then. First Edition (1984). John Weatherhill, Inc. ISBN 0-8348-0195-7.
- Lafcadio Hearn Kwaidan. First edition (1904). Houghton Mifflin & Co.
