= Taira no Sadamori =

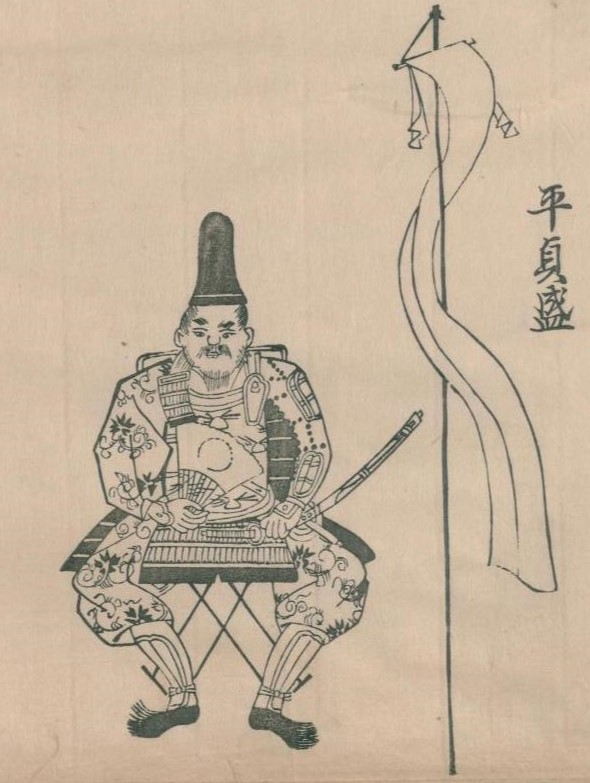
Tairo no Sadamori

Taira no Sadamori (平 貞盛)(10th century) was a samurai of the Taira clan who was involved in suppressing the revolt of Taira no Masakado in the 930s-940.

== Family ==
Taira no Sadamori was the son of Taira no Kunika and grandson of Taira no Takamochi, the founder of the Kammu Heishi line. Sadamori was an ancestor of the Hōjō clan which wielded considerable political power several centuries later, during the Kamakura period; his fourth son, Taira no Korehira, was the progenitor of the Ise Taira branch family.

== Life ==
In 935, while Sadamori held the post of Samanojō (deputy horseguard), his father was killed by Taira no Masakado, in an uprising.

Sadamori and Fujiwara no Hidesato pursued and faced Masakado, killing him in the 940 battle of Kojima.

Sadamori was awarded the fifth rank in court for his heroism, and over the course of his life later earned the posts of Chinjufu-shōgun and governor (kami) of Mutsu Province, as well as the fourth rank at court.

Elements of Sadamori's life are mentioned in the folklore volume Konjaku Monogatarishū (Tales of Past and Present).).
