= Fujiwara no Hidesato =

Samurai of mid-Heian period

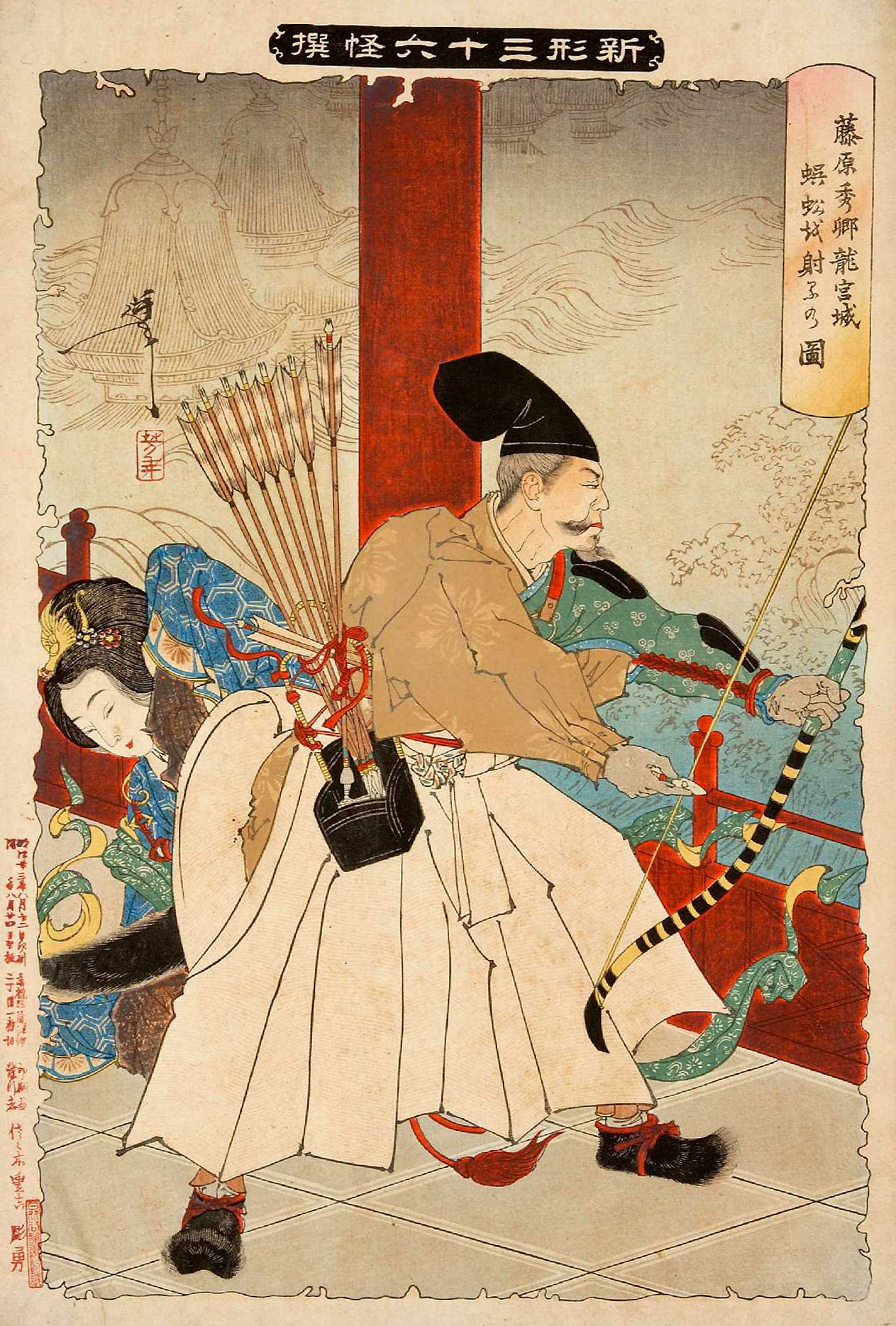
Fujiwara no Hidesato depicted in an 1890 print by Yoshitoshi

Fujiwara no Hidesato (藤原 秀郷) was a Japanese aristocrat, courtier, folk hero and samurai lord of the tenth century in the Heian period. He is famous for his military exploits and courage, and is regarded as the common ancestor of numerous clans, including the Ōshū branch of the Fujiwara clan.

Hidesato served under Emperor Suzaku, and fought alongside Taira no Sadamori in 940 in suppressing the revolt of Taira no Masakado. His prayer for victory before this battle is commemorated in the Kachiya Festival. Hidesato was then appointed Chinjufu shōgun (Defender of the North) and Governor of Shimotsuke Province.

According to legend, he slew a giant centipede in Ōmi Province that plagued the Dragon Palace. He was also nicknamed Tawara Tōda.

== Hidesato in legend ==
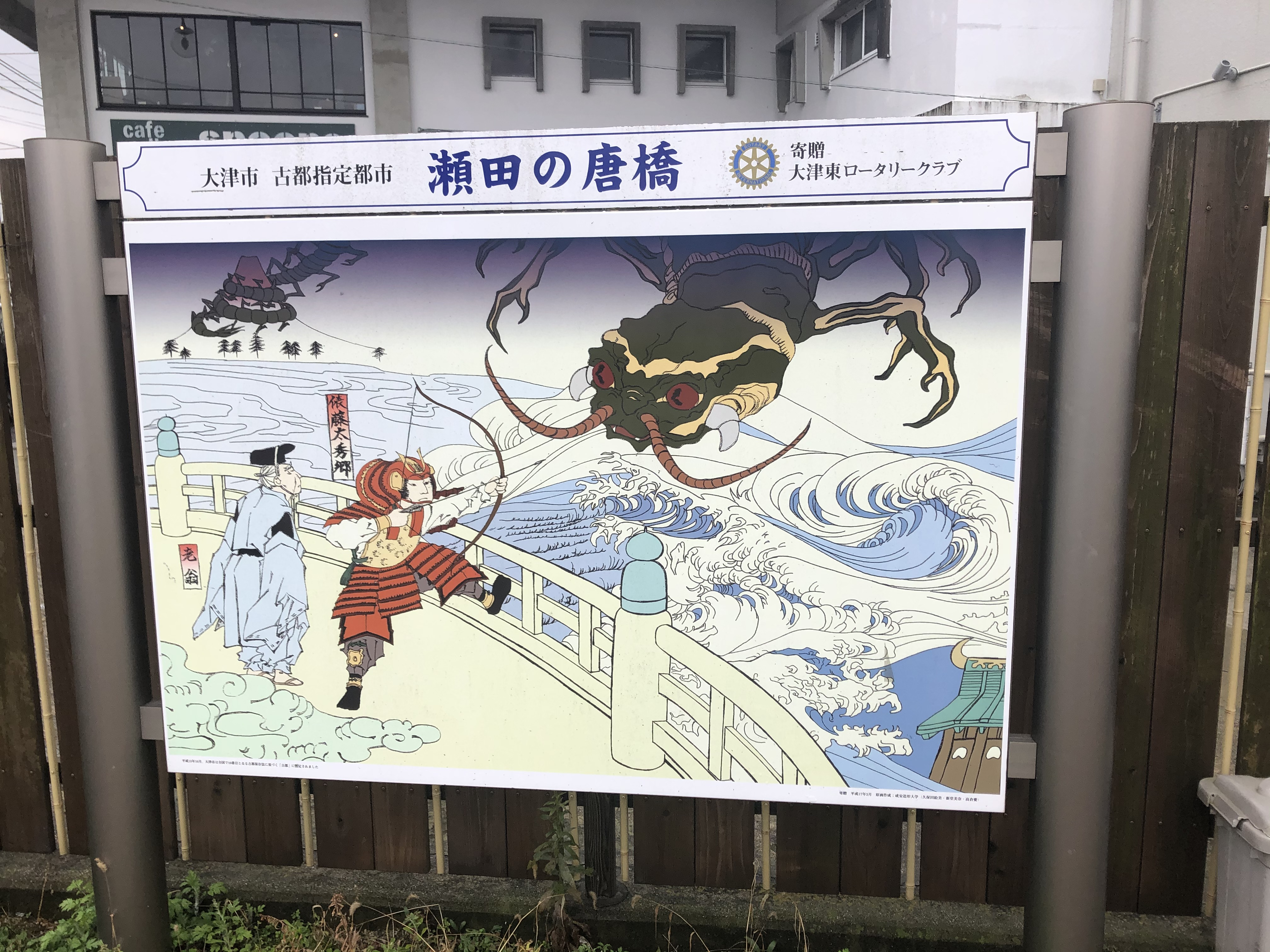
Legend monument for his exploit of slaying the giant centipede at Seta no Karahashi

Hidesato, also known by the moniker Tawara Tōda or Tawara no Tōta, is known in legend for his exploit of slaying the giant centipede (mukade) of Mount Mikami. Hidesato was recruited to this task by a giant dragon-snake, which was, in fact, a resident of the Ryūgū-jō (Dragon Palace). Hidesato meets the Dragon King and is showered with rewards, which included an inexhaustible bale of rice (tawara), from which he allegedly earned his nickname. A more rational explanation is that Tawara, also written differently as "田原", represents either a surname or a place name.

This centipede story, Tawara Tōda Monogatari, together with a romanticized account of his Masakado expedition comprise the Tawara Tōda Monogatari. The monogatari texts have been copied and printed profusely in emakimono (picture scrolls) and illustrated books throughout the Edo period.

=== Legendary arms ===
The Ise Shrine's Jingū Chōkokan Museum houses two swords that allegedly once belonged to Hidesato.

One is the Kenukigata tachi (Ise), a tachi of the kenukigata or "tweezer" type. (Note: Called "tweezer" type because there is openwork on the hilt, which makes the hilt resemble a pair of tweezers.) According to tradition, it was the sword obtained by Hidesato from the Ryūgū-jō, which later became an heirloom of the Akahori clan. After changing hands several times, it came into the shrine's possession in 1793. Although the Hidesato provenance is unverifiable, this sword is dated to be of the correct period.

The other alleged Hidesato sword at the museum is called Mukadegiri "Centipede-cutter". Although its inscriptions claim it to be the work of the swordsmith Shinsoku (神息) from the 8th century, the sword has been dated to the 14th century. (Note: The name is Mukadegiri (蚣切) (two characters) on the carved hilt-inscription according to Shūko jusshu (1899).)

There is also another "tweezer" type sword alleged to have belonged to Hidesato held in Chikubu Island, the Kenukigata tachi (Hōgon-ji).

== Genealogy ==
- Father: Fujiwara no Murao (藤原村雄)
- Mother: daughter of Shimatsuke-no-jō no Kashima (下野掾鹿島女)
  - Wife: daughter of Minamoto no Michi (源通) of the Board of Chamberlains (侍従).
    - Son: Fujiwara no Chitsune (藤原千常)
  - Children by unknown mother:
    - Son: Fujiwara no Chitoki (藤原千時)
    - Son: Fujiwara no Chiharu (藤原千晴)
    - Son: Fujiwara no Chikuni (藤原千国)
    - Son: Fujiwara no Chigusa (藤原千種)
    - Daughter Hintia no Chigusa (藤原千種)

=== Descendants ===
Many samurai clans claim descent from Hidesato, including the Northern Fujiwara (Ōshū branch of the Fujiwara clan). Some of the others are the Satō, Ōtomo, Mutō, Iga, Hatano, Oyama, Yūki and Shimokōbe clans.

== See also ==
- Kaze to Kumo to Niji to, a Japanese drama
