= Emperor Suzaku =

Emperor of Japan from 930 to 946

Emperor Suzaku; 朱雀天皇
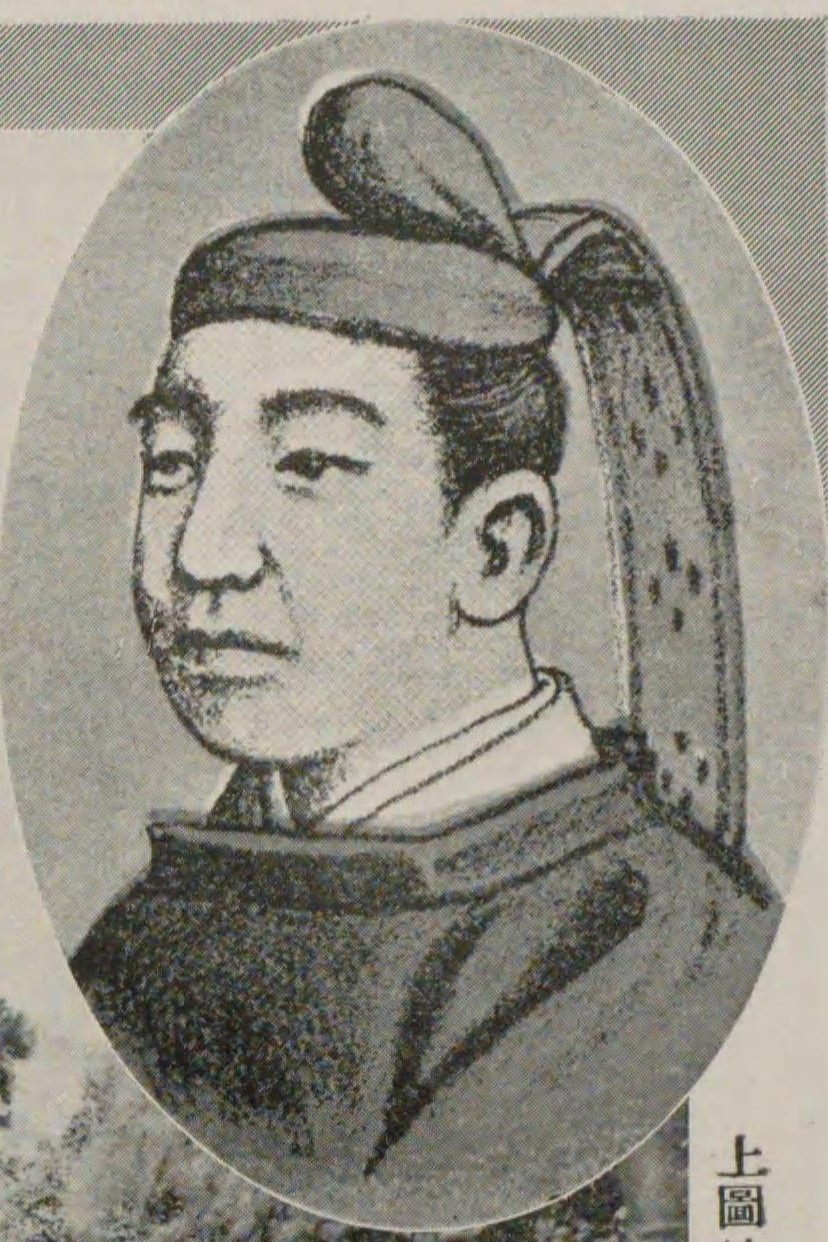

Emperor of Japan
- Reign: 16 October 930 – 23 May 946
- Enthronement: 14 December 930
- Predecessor: Daigo
- Successor: Murakami
- Born: 7 September 921; Heian Kyō (Kyōto)
- Died: 6 September 952 (aged 30); Ninna-ji
- Burial: Daigo no misasagi (醍醐陵) (Kyōto)
- Issue: Empress Masako
Posthumous name
- Tsuigō: Emperor Suzaku (朱雀院 or 朱雀天皇)
- House: Imperial House of Japan
- Father: Emperor Daigo
- Mother: Fujiwara no Onshi

Emperor Suzaku (朱雀天皇(すざくてんのう), Suzaku-tennō; 7 September 921 – 6 September 952) was the 61st emperor of Japan, according to the traditional order of succession.

Suzaku's reign spanned the years from 930 through 946.

== Biography ==
Before he ascended the Chrysanthemum Throne, his personal name (imina) was Hiroakira-shinnō. He was also known as Yutaakira-shinnō (寛明親王(ゆたあきらしんのう)).

Hiroakira-shinnō was the 11th son of Emperor Daigo and Empress Consort Onshi, a daughter of the regent and great minister of the council of state, Fujiwara no Mototsune.

Suzaku had two Empresses or consorts and one Imperial daughter.

== Events of Suzaku's life ==
Suzaku's older brother died unexpectedly young, as did his brother's son. These untimely deaths opened the way for Suzaku to accede to the throne.

- 16 October 930 (Enchō 8, 22nd day of the 9th month): In the 33rd year of the reign of Daigo-tennō (醍醐天皇三十三年), the emperor abdicated; and the succession (the senso) was received by his eleventh son, Hiroakira-shinnō (also known as Yutaakira-shinnō).
- 14 December 930 (Enchō 8, 22nd day of the 11th month): Emperor Suzaku, who was only eight years old, acceded to the throne (the sokui).
- 16 May 931 (Enchō 9, 26th day of the 4th month): The era name was changed to mark the beginning of the new emperor's reign.
- 5 August 931 (Jōhei 1, 19th day of the 7th month): The former-Emperor Uda (867–931) died at the age of 65.
- 6 September 932 (Jōhei 2, 4th day of the 8th month): The udaijin (Minister of the Right) Fujiwara no Sadakata died at the age of 65.
- 14 March 933 (Jōhei 3, 16th day of the 2nd month): The dainagon (Counselor) Fujiwara no Nakahira is named udaijin. Nakahira is the brother of sesshō (regent) Fujiwara no Tadahira.
- 933 (Jōhei 3, 12th month): Ten of the chief dignitaries of the empire went falcon-hunting together in Owari Province. Each of them was magnificent in his formal hunting attire.
- 935 (Jōhei 5): The Great Fundamental Central Hall (kompon chūdō) on Mt. Hiei burned down.
- 7 September 936 (Jōhei 6, 19th day of the 8th month): Fujiwara no Tadahira was named daijō-daijin (Prime Minister); and in this same period, Fujiwara no Nakahira was named sadaijin (Minister of the Left), and Fujiwara no Tsunesuke was named udaijin.
- 937 (Jōhei 7, 12th month): The former-Emperor Yōzei celebrated his 70th birthday.
- 938 (Jōhei 8, 4th month): Serial intermittent ground-tremors were felt in Heian-kyō from the 10th through the 29th days of this month.
- 940 (Tengyō 3): During his reign, Taira no Masakado raised a great insurrection in the Kantō region and declared himself the "New Emperor" (新皇). Still, his forces were defeated by Fujiwara no Hidesato and Taira no Sadamori, and he was decapitated.
- 941 (Tengyō 4): Fujiwara no Sumitomo staged a rebellion, having made a secret agreement with Taira no Masakado, but his army was defeated by Tachibana Tōyasu.
- 23 May 946 (Tengyō 9, 20th day of the 4th month): Suzaku abdicates, having ruled for 16 years. The emperor was succeeded by his younger brother, who would become Emperor Murakami.
- 952 (Tenryaku 6): Suzaku took ordination as a Buddhist monk at Ninna-ji.
- 6 September 952 (Tenryaku 6, 15th day of the 8th month): Suzaku died at the age of 30.

The actual site of Suzaku's grave is known. This emperor is traditionally venerated at a memorial Shinto shrine (misasagi) at Kyoto.

The Imperial Household Agency designates this location as Suzaku's mausoleum. It is formally named Daigo no misasagi in Fushimi-ku, Kyoto near the Buddhist temple, Daigo-ji.

=== Kugyō ===
Kugyō (公卿) is a collective term for the very few most powerful men attached to the court of the Emperor of Japan in pre-Meiji eras.

This elite group generally included only three to four men at a time. These were hereditary courtiers whose experience and background had brought them to the pinnacle of a life's career. During Suzaku's reign, this apex of the Daijō-kan included:

- Sesshō, Fujiwara no Tadahira, 880–949.
- Kampaku, Fujiwara no Tadahira.
- Daijō-daijin, Fujiwara no Tadahira.
- Sadaijin, Fujiwara no Tadahira .
- Sadaijin, Fujiwara no Nakahira.
- Udaijin, Fujiwara no Sadakata (藤原定方).
- Udaijin, Fujiwara no Nakahira.
- Udaijin, Fujiwara no Tsunesuke (藤原恒佐).
- Udaijin, Fujiwara no Saneyori, 900–970.
- Naidaijin
- Dainagon, Fujiwara no Nakahira.

== Eras of Suzaku's reign ==
Japanese Imperial kamon – a stylised chrysanthemum blossom

The years of Suzaku's reign are more specifically identified by more than one era name or nengō.

- Enchō (923–931)
- Jōhei (931–938)
- Tengyō (938–947)

== Ancestry ==
Ancestors of Emperor Suzaku

8. Emperor Kōkō (830–867)
4. Emperor Uda (867–931)
9. Princess Hanshi (833–900)
2. Emperor Daigo (885–930)
10. Fujiwara no Takafuji (838–900)
5. Fujiwara no Inshi (d. 896)
11. Miyaji no Tsurako
1. Emperor Suzaku
12. Fujiwara no Nagara (802–856)
6. Fujiwara no Mototsune (836–891)
13. Fujiwara no Otoharu
3. Fujiwara no Onshi (885–954)
14. Prince Saneyasu (831–872)
7. Princess Sōshi

== See also ==
- Emperor of Japan
- List of Emperors of Japan
- Imperial cult
- Emperor Go-Suzaku

Regnal titles
Preceded by Emperor Daigo	Emperor of Japan: Suzaku; 930–946	Succeeded by Emperor Murakami
