= Fujiwara no Tadahira =

Japanese statesman, courtier and politician

Senior First Rank Fujiwara no Tadahira 藤原 忠平
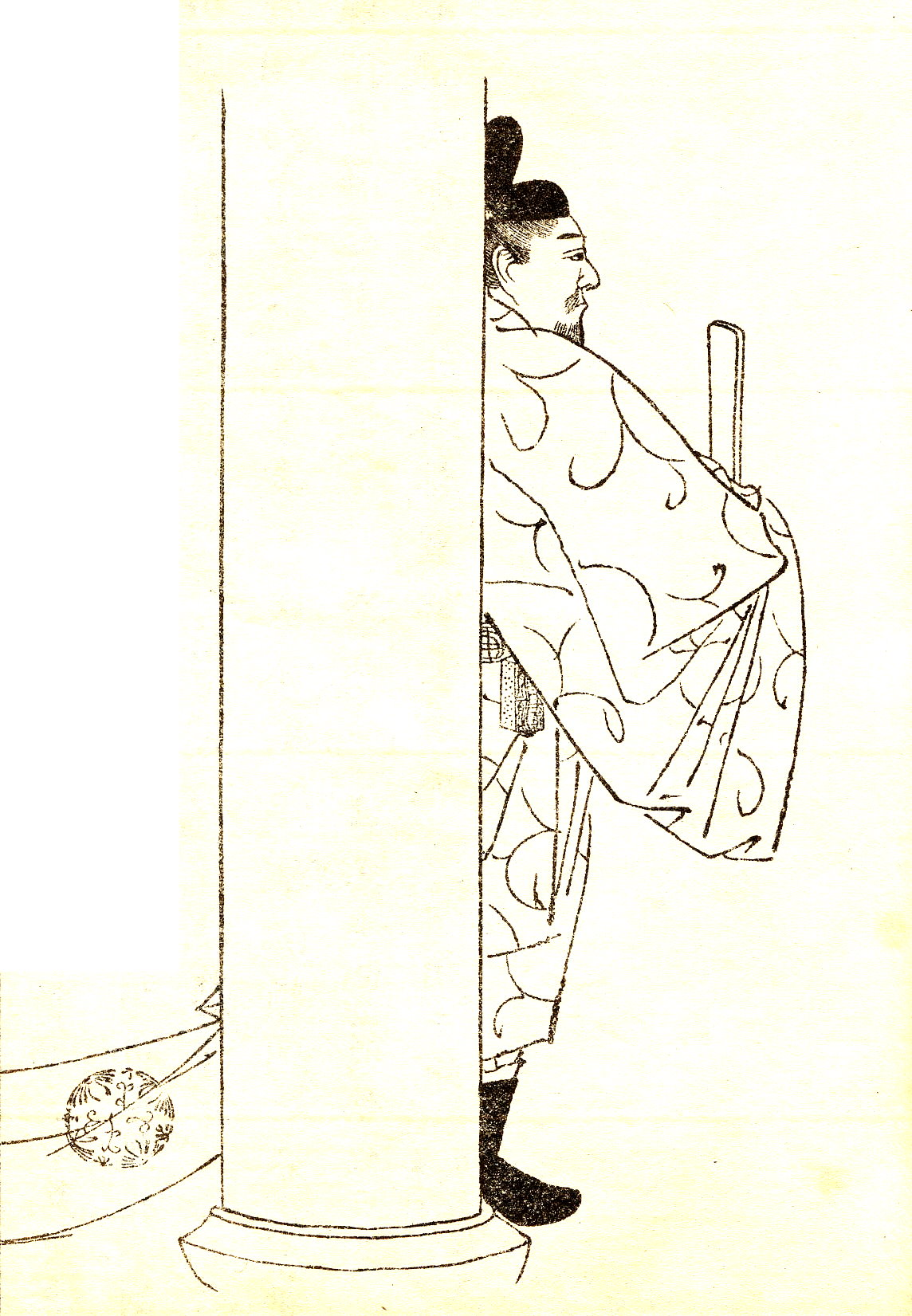
- Tadahira by Kikuchi Yōsai

Imperial Regent of Japan
- In office 16 October 930 – 9 September 949
- Monarchs: Suzaku; Murakami
- Preceded by: Fujiwara no Mototsune
- Succeeded by: Fujiwara no Saneyori

Personal details
- Born: 880
- Died: 9 September 949 (aged 68–69) Heian Kyō (Kyōto)
- Spouse(s): Minamoto no Junshi; Minamoto no Shōshi
- Parent: Fujiwara no Mototsune (father)

Fujiwara no Tadahira (藤原 忠平; 880 – 9 September 949) was a Japanese statesman, courtier and politician during the Heian period. He is also known as Teishin-Kō (貞信公) or Ko-ichijō Dono (小一条殿) or Ko-ichijō daijō-daijin.

== Career ==
Tadahira was a kuge (Japanese noble) who is credited with writing and publishing Engishiki. He is one of the principal editors responsible for the development of the Japanese legal code known as Sandai-kyaku-shiki, sometimes referred to as the Rules and Regulations of the Three Generations.

Tadahira served as regent under Emperor Suzaku who ruled from 930 to 946.

- 17 September 914 (Engi 14, 25th day of the 8th month): Dainagon Tadahira was named udaijin.
- 16 October 930 (Enchō 8, 22nd day of the 9th month): Tadahira was appointed sesshō.
- 7 September 936 (Jōhei 6, 19th day of the 8th month): He assumed the role of daijō-daijin.
- 16 February 937 (Jōhei 7, 4th day of the 1st month): He presided over the coming of age ceremony of Emperor Suzaku.
- 29 November 941 (Tengyō 4, 8th day of the 11th month): He became kampaku.

== Genealogy ==
This member of the Fujiwara clan was the son of Mototsune. Tadahira's brothers were Fujiwara no Tokihira and Fujiwara no Nakahira. Emperor Suzaku and Emperor Murakami where the maternal nephews of Tadahira.

Tadahira took over the head of the Hokke branch of the Fujiwara clan in 909 when his elder brother Tokihira died.

=== Wives and progeny ===
He was married to Minamoto no Junshi (源 順子), daughter of Emperor Uda.

They had a son.

- Fujiwara no Saneyori, also known as Ononomiya Dono (小野宮殿). - Kampaku for Emperor Reizei 967–969, and Sesshō for Emperor En'yū 969–970

He was also married to Minamoto no Shōshi (源 昭子), daughter of Minamoto no Yoshiari.

They had several children.

- Morosuke - Udaijin 947–960, grandfather of Emperor Reizei and Emperor En'yū
- Moroyasu (師保) - priest
- Morouji (師氏) (913–970) - Dainagon 969–970
- Morotada (師尹) (920–969) - Sadaijin 969

Daughters' mothers were unknown. (She might be Junshi or Shōshi.)

- Kishi (貴子) (904–962) - consort of Crown Prince Yasuakira
- Kanshi (寛子) (906–945) - consort of Imperial Prince Shigeakira

== Selected works ==
In a statistical overview derived from writings by and about Fujiwara no Tadahiro, OCLC/WorldCat encompasses roughly 9 works in 13 publications in 2 languages and 201 library holdings.

- 延喜式 (1723)
- 延喜式 (1828)
- Teishinkōki: the Year 939 in the Journal of Regent Fujiwara no Tadahira (1956)

== Honours ==
- Senior First Rank (September 13, 949; posthumous)
