= Fujiwara no Nakahira =

Japanese statesman, courtier and politician

Senior Second Rank Fujiwara no Nakahira 藤原 仲平
- Born: 875
- Died: October 13, 945 (aged 69–70)
- Parents: Fujiwara no Mototsune (father)

Fujiwara no Nakahira (藤原仲平; 875 – October 13, 945), also known as Biwa no daijin, was a Japanese statesman, courtier and politician during the Heian period.

In 945 he took tonsure as a Buddhist monk and died the same year. His Dharma name was Seikan (静寛).

== Career at court ==
He was a minister during the reigns of Emperor Daigo and Emperor Suzaku.

- 932 (Jōhei 2, 8th month): Nakahira was made udaijin.
- 945 (Tengyō 8, 9th month): Sadaijin Nakahira died; and he was posthumously honored by the emperor.

== Genealogy ==
This member of the Fujiwara clan was the son of Fujiwara no Mototsune. Nakahira's brothers were Fujiwara no Tokihira and Fujiwara no Tadahira.
