= Enchō =

Period of Japanese history (923–931 CE)

Enchō (延長) was a Japanese era name (年号, nengō; "year name") after Engi and before Jōhei. This period spanned the years from April 923 through April 931. The reigning emperors were Emperor Daigo-tennō (醍醐天皇) and Emperor Suzaku-tennō (朱雀天皇).

== Change of era ==
- January 20, 923 Enchō gannen (延長元年): The new era name was created to mark an event or series of events. The previous era ended and the new one commenced in Engi 23, on the 11th day of the intercalary 4th month of 923.

== Events of the Enchō era ==
- 929 (Enchō 7, 8th month): Floods devastated the country and many perished.
- July 24, 930 (Enchō 8, 26th day of the 6th month): A huge black storm cloud traveled from the slopes of Mt. Atago to Heian-kyō accompanied by frightful thunder. Lightning struck the Imperial Palace. Both Senior Counselor Fuijwara-no Kiyotsura (also known as Miyoshi no Kiyoyuki) and Middle Controller of the Right Taira-no Mareyo and many other subaltern officers were killed and their bodies were consumed in the subsequent fires. The deaths were construed as an act of revenge by the unsettled spirit of the late Sugawara no Michizane.
- October 16, 930 (Enchō 8, 22nd day of the 9th month): In the 34th year of Daigo-tennō's reign (醍醐天皇34年), the emperor fell ill; and, fearing that he might not survive, Daigo abdicated. At this point, the succession (senso) was said to have been received by his son. Shortly thereafter, Emperor Suzaku is said to have acceded to the throne (sokui).
- October 23, 930 (Enchō 8, 29th day of the 9th month): Emperor Daigo entered the Buddhist priesthood in the very early morning hours. As a monk, he took the Buddhist name Hō-kongō; and shortly thereafter, this humble monk died at the age of 46. This monk was buried in the precincts of Daigo-ji, which is why the former-emperor's posthumous name became Daigo-tennō.

== Notes ==
Preceded by Engi	Era or nengō Enchō; 923–931	Succeeded by Jōhei
