= Tentoku =

Period of Japanese history (957–961 CE)

Tentoku (天徳, [te̞nto̞ku͍]) was a Japanese era name (年号, nengō, "year name") after Tenryaku and before Ōwa. This period spanned the years from October 957 through February 961. The reigning emperors was Murakami-tennō (村上天皇).

== Change of era ==
- February 3, 957 Tentoku gannen (天徳元年): The new era name was created to mark an event or series of events. The previous era ended and the new one commenced in Tenryaku 11, on the 27th day of the 10th month.

== Events of the Tentoku era ==
- 957 (Tentoku 1, 4th month): The emperor celebrated the 50th birthday of Fujiwara Morosuke; and on this occasion Murakami himself offered Morosuke a cup of sake.
- 958 (Tentoku 2, 3rd month): Fujiwara Saneyori is honored with the privilege of traveling by cart./
- October 16, 960 (Tentoku 4, 23rd day of the 9th month): The Imperial palace burned down, the first time it had been ravaged by fire since the capital was removed from Nara to Heian-kyō in 794.

== Notes ==
Preceded by Tenryaku	Era or nengō Tentoku; 957–961	Succeeded by Ōwa
