= Tengyō =

Period of Japanese history (938–947 CE)

Tengyō (天慶) was a Japanese era name (年号, nengō, "year name") after Jōhei and before Tenryaku. This period spanned the years from May 938 through April 947. The reigning emperors were Suzaku-tennō (朱雀天皇) and Murakami-tennō (村上天皇).

== Change of era ==
- February 2, 938 Tengyō gannen (天慶元年): The new era name was created to mark an event or series of events. The previous era ended and the new one commenced in Jōhei 8, on the 23rd day of the 5th month.

== Events of the Tengyō era ==
- April 6, 938 (Tengyō 1, 4th day of the 3rd month): Ten pairs of roosters were matched-up in cockfights before the emperor.
- 938 (Tengyō 1, 4th month): Several intermittent ground-tremors were felt in Heian-kyō from the 10th through the 29th days of this month.
- 939 (Tengyō 1, 1st month): Fujiwara no Tadahira celebrated his 60th birthday.
- 939 (Tengyō 2, 5th month): The udaijin Fujiwara no Tsunesuke died.
- 939 (Tengyō 2, 12th month): The beginning of the revolt of Taira no Masakado, also known as Jōhei Tengyo no ran
- 941 (Tengyō 4, 7th month) : Fujiwara no Sumitomo died; also the end of Jōhei Tengyo no ran
- 941 (Tengyō 4, 11th month): The emperor created Tadahira kampaku.
- 944 (Tengyō 7, 11th month): Fujiwara no Saneyori, the eldest son of Tadahira, was named udaijin.
- 945 (Tengyō 8, 11th month): The sadaijin Fujiwara no Nakahira died at age 71.
- May 16, 946 (Tengyō 9, 13th day of the 4th month): In the 16th year of the reign of Suzaku-tennō (朱雀天皇17年), the emperor abdicated; and the succession (the senso) was received by his younger brother, Nariakira-shinnō.
- May 31, 946 (Tengyō 9, 28th day of the 4th month): Emperor Murakami, who was 21 years old, acceded to the throne (the sokui).

== Notes ==
Preceded by Jōhei	Era or nengō Tengyō; 938–947	Succeeded by Tenryaku
