= Jōhei =

Period of Japanese history (931–938 CE)

Jōhei (承平), also romanized as Shōhei, was a Japanese era name (年号, nengō; "year name") after Enchō and before Tengyō. This period spanned the years from April 931 through May 938. The reigning emperor was Emperor Suzaku-tennō (朱雀天皇).

== Change of era ==
- January 22, 931 Jōhei gannen (承平元年): The new era name was created to mark an event or series of events. The previous era ended and the new one commenced in Enchō 9, on the 26th day of the 4th month of 931.

== Events of the Jōhei era ==
- September 3, 931 (Jōhei 1, 19th day of the 7th month): The former-Emperor Uda (867-931) died at the age of 65.
- 932 (Jōhei 2, 8th month): The udaijin (Minister of the Right) Fujiwara no Sadakata (873-932) died at the age of 65.
- 933 (Jōhei 3, 8th month): The dainagon (great counselor) Fujiwara no Nakahira, brother of sesshō (regent) Fujiwara Takahira, is named udaijin.
- 933 (Jōhei 3, 12th month): Ten of the chief dignitaries of the empire went falcon-hunting together in Owari Province. Each of them was magnificent in his formal hunting attire.
- 935 (Jōhei 5): The Great Fundamental Central Hall (kompon chūdō) on Mount Hiei burned down.
- September 7, 936 (Jōhei 6, 19th day of the 8th month): Fujiwara no Tadahira was named daijō-daijin (Prime Minister); and in this same period, Fujiwara Nakahira was named sadaijin (Minister of the Left), and Fujiwara Tsunesuke was named udaijin.
- 937 (Jōhei 7, 12th month): The former-Emperor Yōzei celebrated his 70th birthday.

== Notes ==
Preceded by Enchō	Era or nengō Jōhei; 931–938	Succeeded by Tengyō
