= Daigo-ji =

Buddhist temple in Fushimi-ku, Kyoto, Japan

- 醍醐寺
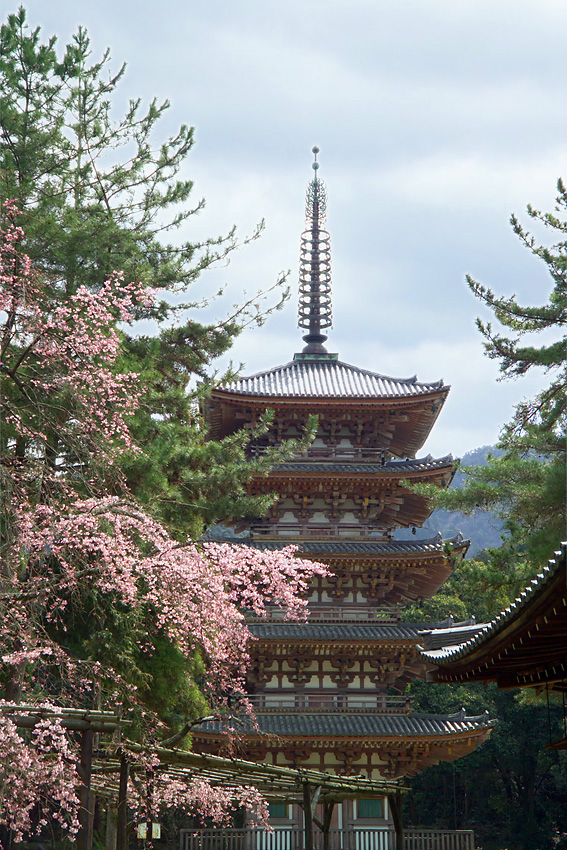
- Daigo-ji pagoda

- Location within Kyoto Prefecture Location within Japan

Religion
- Affiliation: Buddhist
- Deity: Yakushi Nyorai
- Rite: Shingon-shū Daigo-ha
- Status: functional

Location
- Location: 22 Higashioji-cho, Daigo, Fushimi-ku, Kyoto-shi, Kyoto-fu
- Country: Japan
- Interactive map of Daigo-ji
- Coordinates: 34°57′5.4″N 135°49′18.4″E

Architecture
- Founder: Shōbō
- Completed: 874
- UNESCO World Heritage Site
- Type: Cultural
- Criteria: ii, iv
- Designated: 1994
- Reference no.: 688

Website
- http://www.daigoji.or.jp/
- National Treasure National Important Cultural Property Special Place of Scenic Beauty National Historic Site of Japan

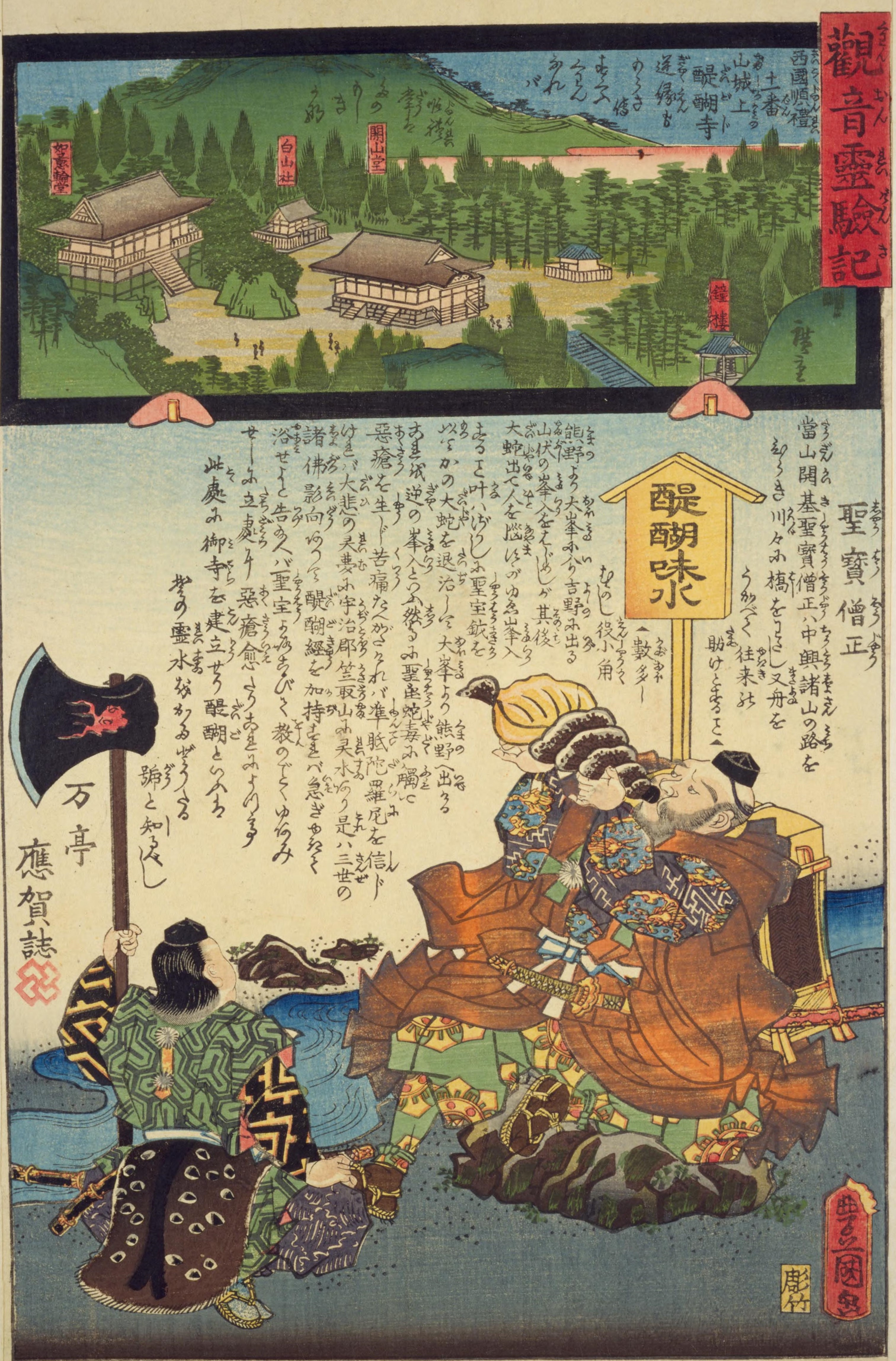
from the picture album "Kannon Reigen ki"

Daigo-ji (醍醐寺) is a Buddhist temple located in Fushimi-ku, Kyoto, Japan. It is the head temple of the Shingon-shū Daigo-ha sect of Japanese Buddhism and its honzon is a hibutsu statue of Yakushi Nyorai. The temple's full name is Kasatori-yama Daigo-ji (笠取山 醍醐寺). The temple is the 11th stop on the Saigoku Kannon Pilgrimage route. Daigo, literally "ghee", is used figuratively to mean "crème de la crème" and is a metaphor of the most profound part of Buddhist thoughts. The temple has a vast grounds of over 6.6 million square meters on Mount Daigo (Kasatoriyama), which spreads southeast of Kyoto City, and houses approximately 150,000 temple treasures, including numerous National Treasures and important cultural properties. It is also known as the site where Toyotomi Hideyoshi held his "Daigo Cherry Blossom Viewing" event. Daigo-ji is one of the 17 component parts of the UNESCO World Heritage Site "Historic Monuments of Ancient Kyoto (Kyoto, Uji and Otsu Cities)". The serial property was inscribed in 1994 under criteria (ii) and (iv) for its testimony to the development of Japanese wooden architecture and garden design; the overall site covers 1,056 ha with a 3,579 ha buffer zone.

== History ==
In 874, during the early Heian period, a temple was founded in what is now the Kami-Daigo location by Shōbō, a disciple of Kūkai, who enshrining the Juntei Kannon and Nyōirin Kannon statues he had carved himself. In 907, at the request of Emperor Daigo, a Yakushi-dō was built to enshrine enshrined a Yakushi Triad followed by a Godai-dō to enshrine the Five Great Wisdom Kings. In 926, the Shaka-dō (Kondō) was built at Shimo-Daigo. At the same time, plans were made to convert the entire Mount Kasatoriyama into a temple. After having fallen ill and abdicated in 930, Emperor Daigo entered Buddhist priesthood at this temple and took the Buddhist name Hō-kongō; and shortly thereafter, died at the age of 46. He was buried in the temple, which is why his posthumous name was Daigo. After Emperor Daigo's death, the expansion project was continued by Emperor Suzaku and Emperor Murakami, and the Hokke Sammai Hall was constructed, among others. In 951, under the direction of Emperor Murakami and Fujiwara no Onshi, a five-story pagoda was erected. The temple acquired shōen manors in Ise, Owari, and Kawachi Provinces for its upkeep. However, this progress did not last long, and with the death of Fujiwara no Onshi, Daigo-ji's progress came to a halt.

Daigo-ji was also a bodaiji for the Minamoto clan, and with the decline in political influence of the clan around the time of Fujiwara no Onshi's death, Daigo-ji also suffered accordingly. However, the temple soon found new patronage with the Imperial family, and became a monzeki temple with the position of abbot held a member of the imperial family. When Fujiwara no Kenshi, the Empress of Emperor Shirakawa, died in 1084, Emperor Shirakawa built Enkō-in temple on the mountain. He interred her remains there and dedicated a gilt bronze Mandala of the Two Realms to the temple. Although nominally a chapel, Enkō-in had vast temple and shrine lands, and thus continued to influence the economy of Daigo-ji Temple for centuries.

During the Nanboku-chō period, the temple produced many notable figures, including the abbot Kenshun, who garnered the support of Ashikaga Takauji, and the highly revered Manzai, known as the "Black-robed Chancellor" during the Muromachi shogunate from Ashikaga Yoshimitsu to Ashikaga Yoshinori. However, when the Onin War broke out, the temple was engulfed in flames and damaged, leaving Shimo-Daigo in ruins, with only the five-story pagoda remaining. In October 1469, during the Ōnin War, villagers from the surrounding area rioted, demanding that their annual tax payments to the temple be halved. Armed warrior monks suppressed the revolt. During the Azuchi-Momoyama period, Toyotomi Hideyoshi was famous for holding large scale cherry blossom viewings at the temple. As part of the temple grounds renovation, Hideyoshi rebuilt the Sanbō-in sub-temple and began the restoration of the temple buildings. His son, Toyotomi Hideyori then renovated the temple complex, completing the relocation of the Kondō in 1600. In 1605, the West Gate was rebuilt. In 1606, the Nyōirin-dō, Kaisan-dō, and Godai-dō (no longer extant) were rebuilt one after another. During the Edo period, abbot Takaen twice climbed Mount Ōmine accompanied by 3,000 mountain ascetics, promoting the rise of Shugendō.

During the Meiji period, the anti-Buddhist movement led to the abolition of many temples, resulting in the loss of many of their treasures. However, Daigo-ji managed to escape relatively intact. However, in August 1939, a forest fire struck Kami-Daigo, destroying the sutra repository and Juntei-dō, the 11th temple of the Saigoku Pilgrimage. The Juntei-dō was rebuilt in May 1968; however, was destroyed again on August 24, 2008, by fire caused by a lightning strike. The statue of Kannon Bosatsu that was housed in the Juntei-do is currently temporarily enshrined in the Kannon-dō in Shimo-Daigo.

== Layout ==
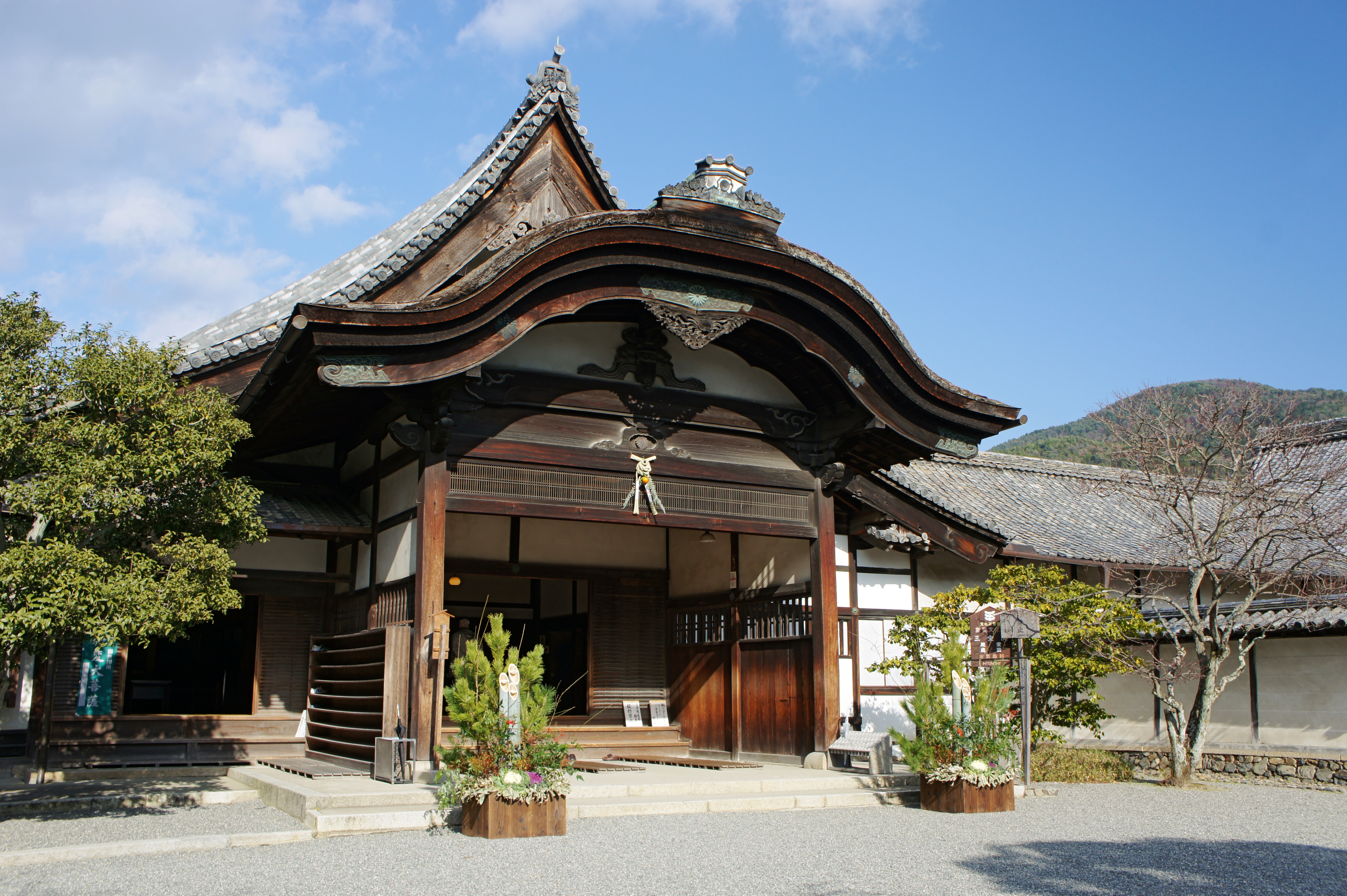
The entrance of Sambō-in

Daigo-ji is laid out in three parts: Sambō-in, Shimo-Daigo (Lower Daigo), and Kami-Daigo (Upper Daigo). These are progressively older, wilder, and further up the mountain. Sambō-in and Shimo-Daigo are at the base of the mountain, easily accessible, and attract the most tourism; Kami-Daigo is on top of the mountain, requires a long, strenuous hike to reach, and is accordingly less visited. The streets around Sambō-in can be freely traveled, but entering Sambō-in proper, the museum, Shimo-Daigo, or Kami-Daigo all require separate admission – the first three have combined ticketing, while Kami-Daigo is separate.

Sambō-in is a collection of walled complexes, connected by streets lined with cherry blossoms. It contains the temple proper (including a noted tea garden), a museum, and other complexes, and is very lively during cherry blossom season. Shimo-Daigo is one large enclosure, containing detached halls, including the oldest surviving building in Kyoto, together with open spaces.

Kami-Daigo, other than a small cluster of buildings at the base, is located on top of the mountain. The entrance to Kami-Daigo can be reached by passing through Shimo-Daigo, or by a path beside Shimo-Daigo. There is a path with stairs up to the top, which takes about one hour to reach the main complex; halfway up there is a resting point and small shrine. At the entrance to the main complex is Daigo-Sui, a spring of holy water, which was the origin of Daigo-ji, together with other buildings. A further fifteen-minute walk reaches the summit, which contains other halls, notably the Kaisan-dō (開山堂; Founder's hall), together with expansive views of the cities below. Beyond the summit, the back of the mountain is almost completely undeveloped, primarily featuring hiking trails. There is, however, the Oku-no-in (奥之院; inner sanctum), a grotto with a few statues, reached by a twenty-minute hike along a rough trail. Due to difficulty reaching, this is rarely visited by tourists, though a temple event is held there on the first Sunday in March. Near the Oku-no-in is an outlook, the Higashi-no-nozoki (東の覗き; east lookout), which offers another view.

=== Shimo-Daigo ===
Shimo-Daigo is centered around the Kondō, which houses the principal image of Yakushi Nyorai, and the Sanbō-in. While it was almost completely burned down during the Ōnin War and has since been rebuilt several times, the Five-story Pagoda remains intact to this day. The Kondō, pagoda and the murals inside the pagoda are all designated as National Treasures, and the image of Kūkai therein is the oldest surviving portrait of Kūkai.

The original Daigo-ji Kondō was constructed in 926 and was originally called the "Shaka-dō." It was burned down twice, once during the Einin era (1293–1299) and once during the Bunmei era (1469–1487). The current Kondō is a seven-by-five bay structure built in the late Heian period, and relocated from Kii Province by Toyotomi Hideyoshi in 1598. According to the "Kii Meishō Zue" and other sources, it was originally the main hall of Mangan-ji Temple in Yuasa, Arita County, Kii Province (present-day Yuasa, Wakayama. At the time of Hideyoshi's conquest of Kii Province, the Shirakashi clan (vassals of the Hatakeyama clan) controlled the Yuasa area and the temple was scheduled to be burned down along with their castle. However, Gien, the abbot of Daigo-ji, petitioned Hideyoshi to spare the structure, so that it could be used to replace the Kondō at Daigo-ji, which had not been rebuilt since its loss in the Ōnin War. While some components of this building date to the Heian period, the hall was renovated during the Kamakura period when it was still in Yuasa, and some Momoyama period techniques were used when it was relocated. It contains the temple's honzon (principal image), a seated Yakushi Nyorai statue (Important Cultural Property), as well as statues of Nikko Bosatsu, Gakko Bosatsu, and the Four Heavenly Kings. The hall's interior is unique in that there are no barriers or partitions separating the inner and outer sanctuaries, creating a single, unified space.

The Five-Story Pagoda was erected in 951 during the late Heian period. The Emperor Daigo's third son, Prince Yōmei, made a vow in 931 to pray for the repose of the soul of his father, who had died the previous year, and the construction was planned by order of Empress Dowager Onshi. However, construction stalled due to the death of Prince Yōmei in 937, and was taken over by his younger brother, Emperor Suzaku. It was not completed until 951, during the reign of Emperor Murakami, 20 years after the vow. The total height is 38 meters, of which the spire is 12.8 meters, accounting for more than 30% of the total height. The roof tapers off sharply and the tower is low, so it does not have the long, slender appearance of later towers. Since its construction, the tower has undergone numerous repairs, including extensive damage from the 1586 Tenshō earthquake. With assistance from Toyotomi Hideyoshi, repairs were completed in March 1598. It also sustained damage from Typhoon Jane in 1950, and repairs were completed in 1960. It is the oldest wooden structure in Kyoto Prefecture and is one of the few remaining Heian-period buildings in Kyoto. The murals depicting the Ryōkai Mandala and the Eight Shingon Patriarchs inside the first story are also important as surviving Heian-period paintings, and are designated as National Treasures as "paintings" separate from the tower itself.

The Shimo-Daigo area also includes the Kiyotaki-gu Main Hall (Important Cultural Property), Nishidaimon Gate (Niōmon) (Designated Tangible Cultural Property of Kyoto Prefecture), rebuilt by Toyotomi Hideyori in 1605 and containing Niō statues (Important Cultural Property) that were originally enshrined at the Great South Gate and were erected in 1134.

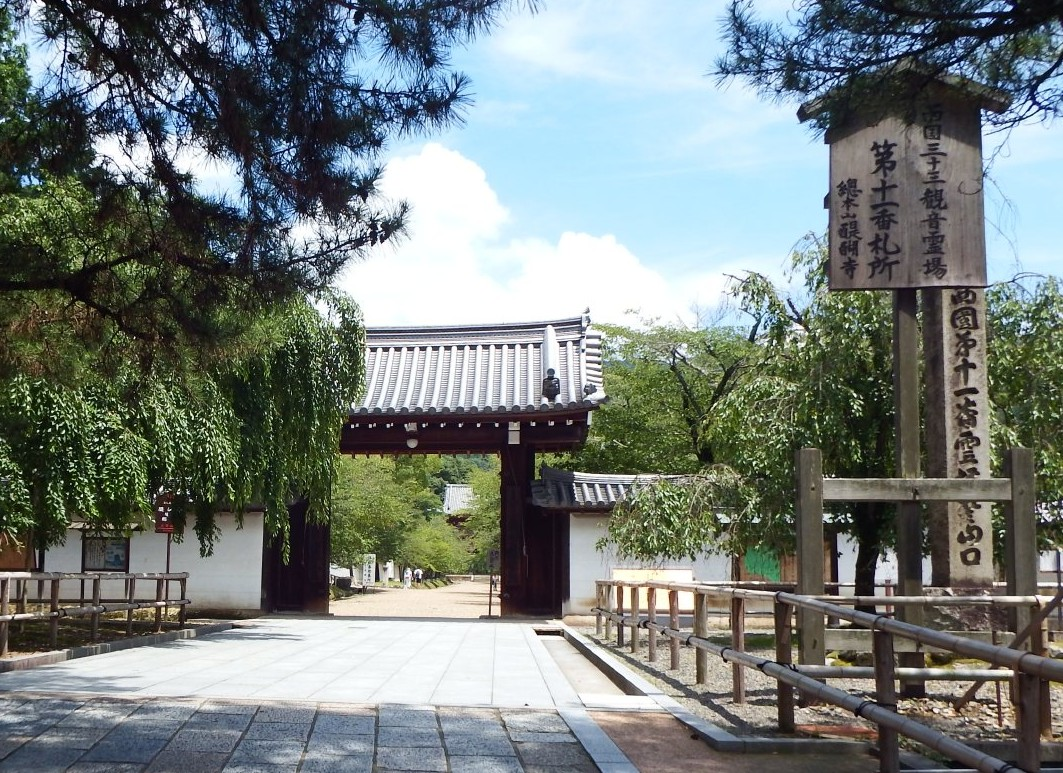
Somon

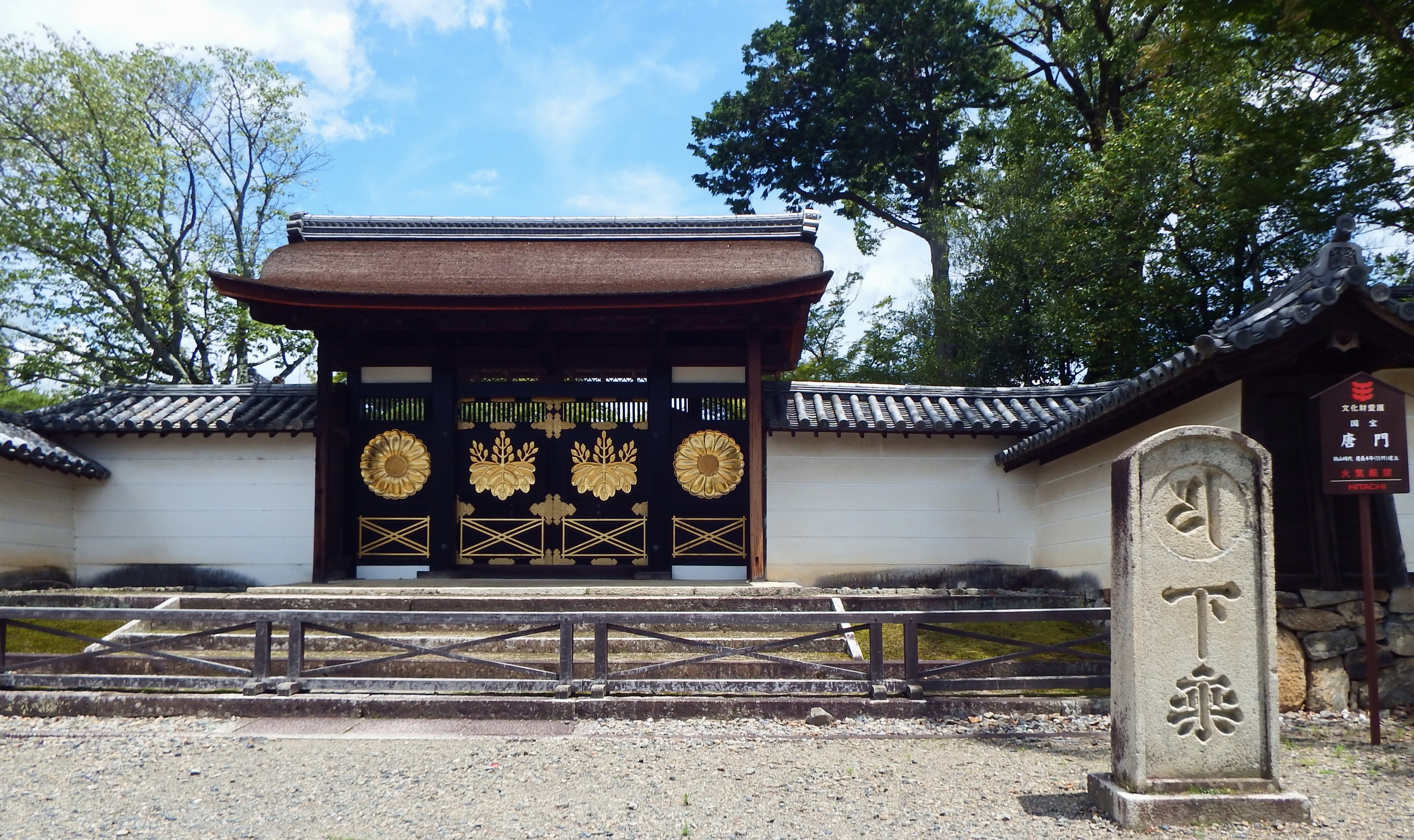
Sanbō-in Karamon（NT）

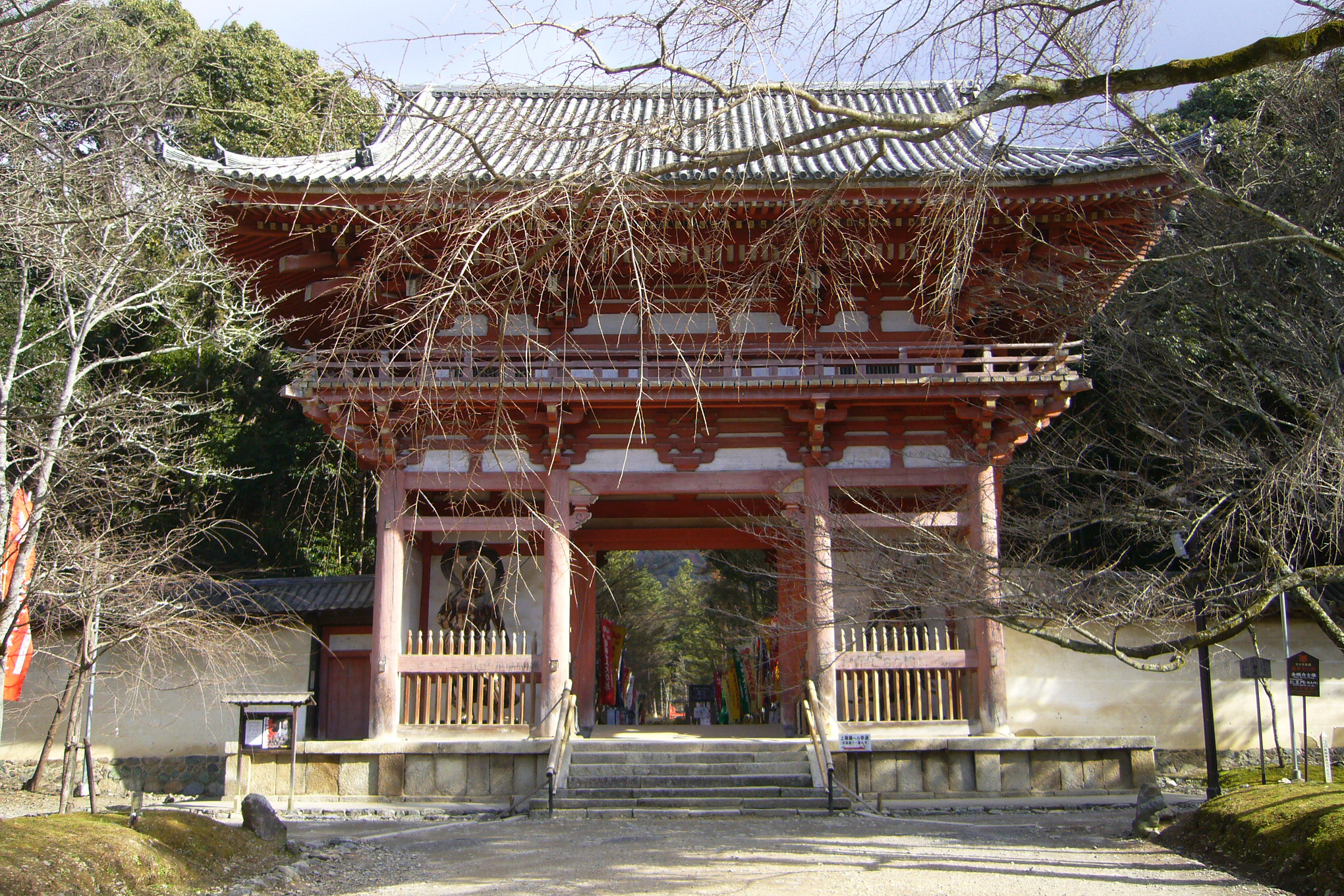
Nishi Daimon（Niōmon）

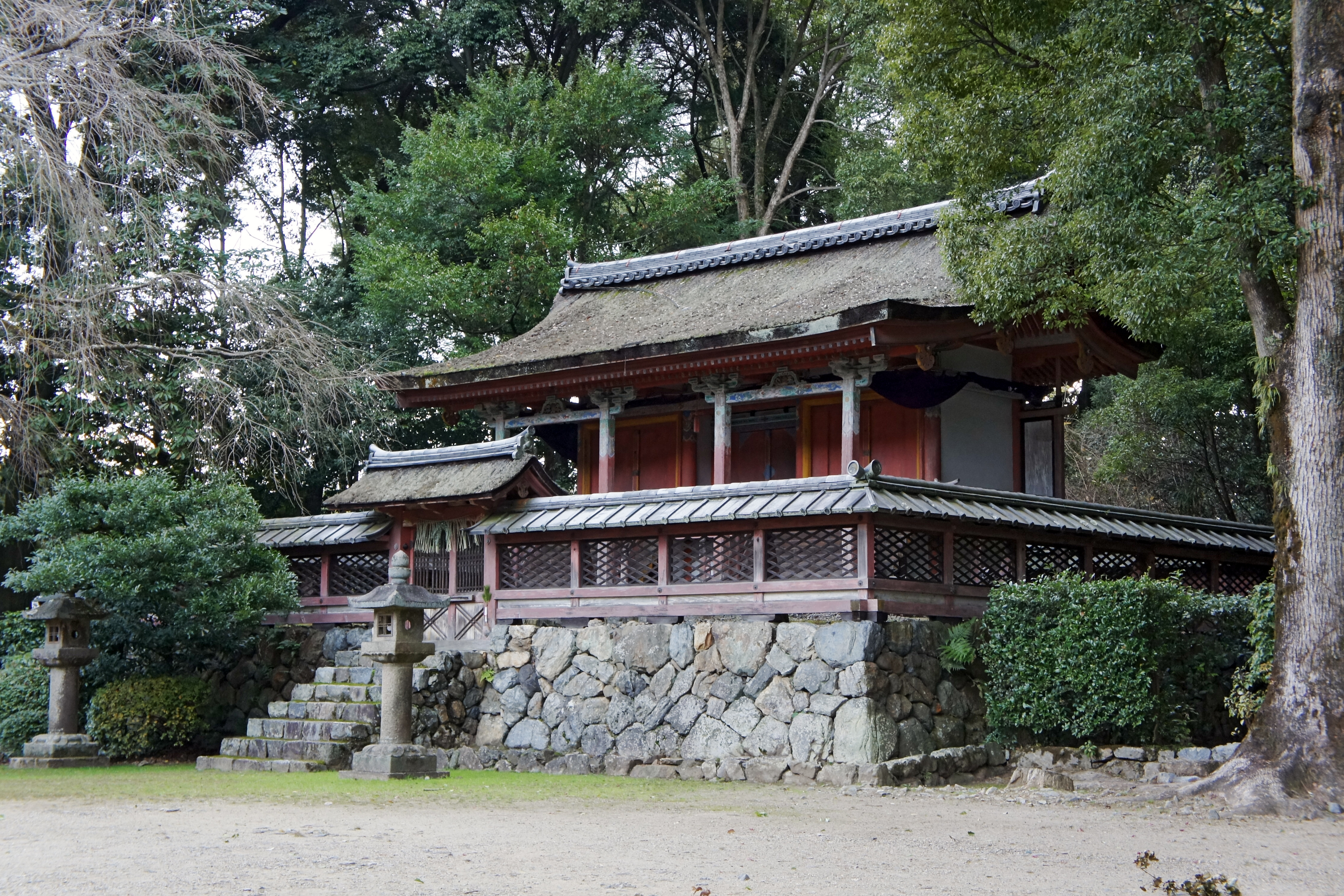
Seiryu-gu Honden（ICP）

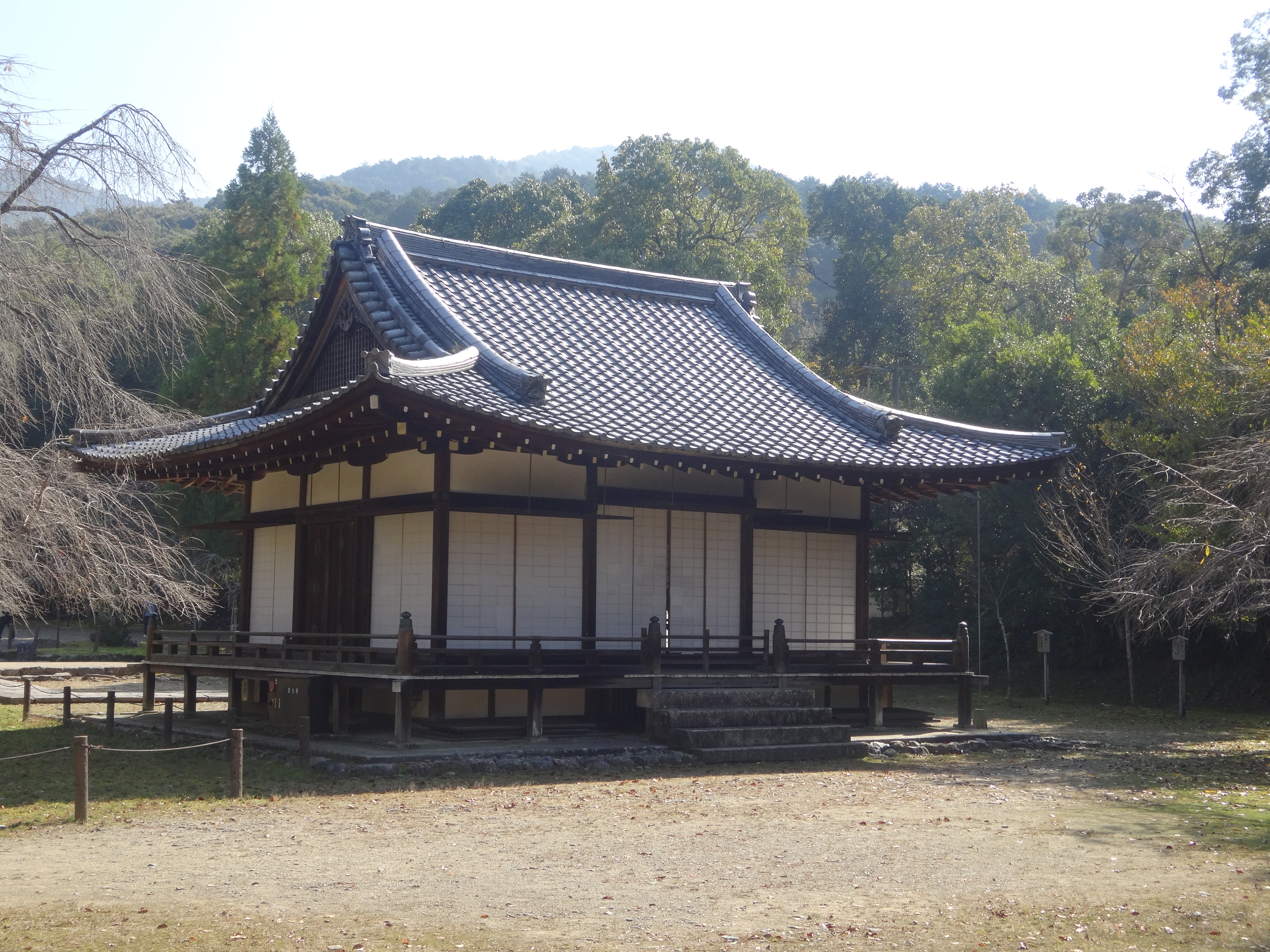
Seiryu-gu Haiden

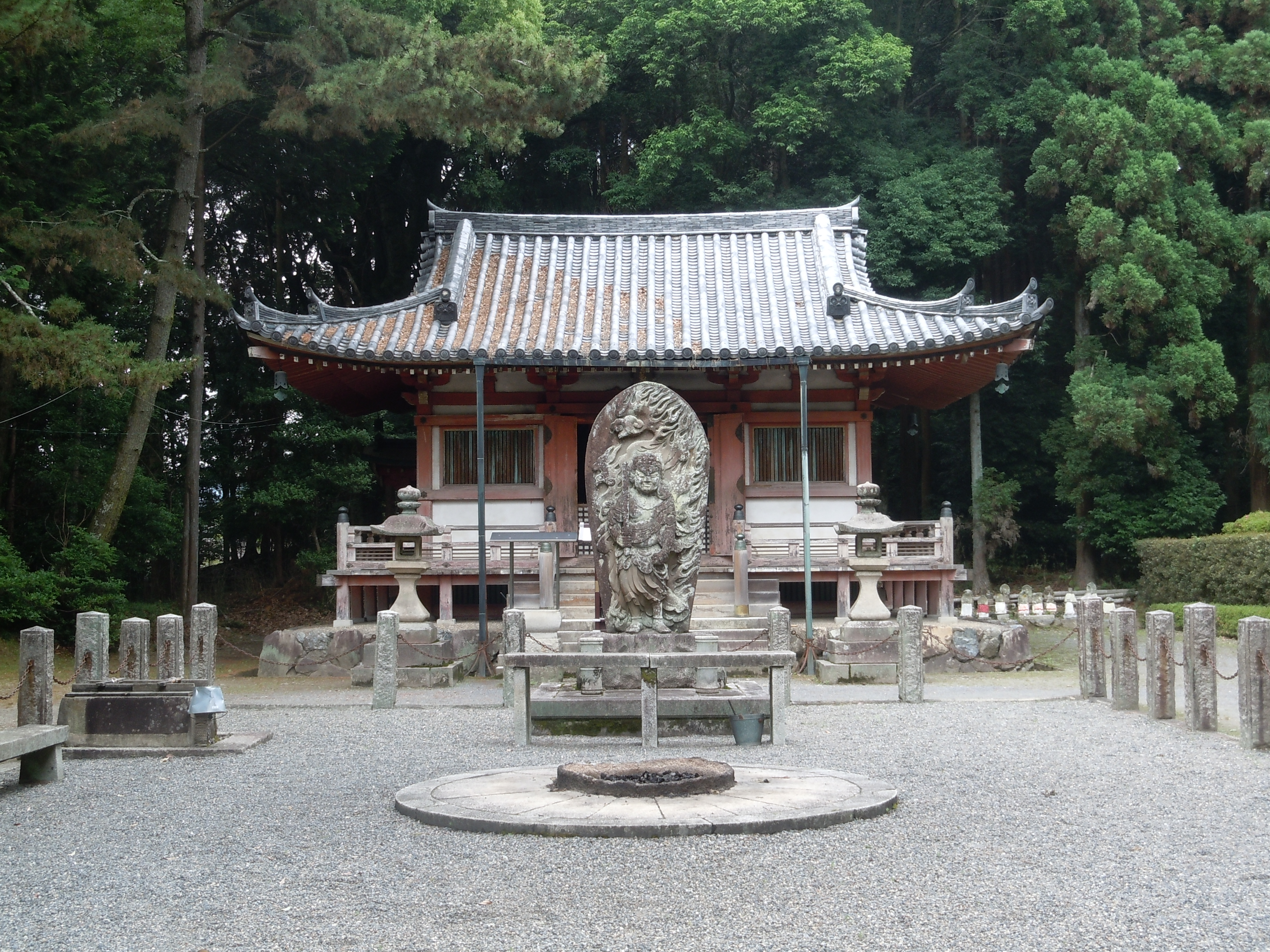
Fudō-dō

Shinnyo Sammaya-dōo

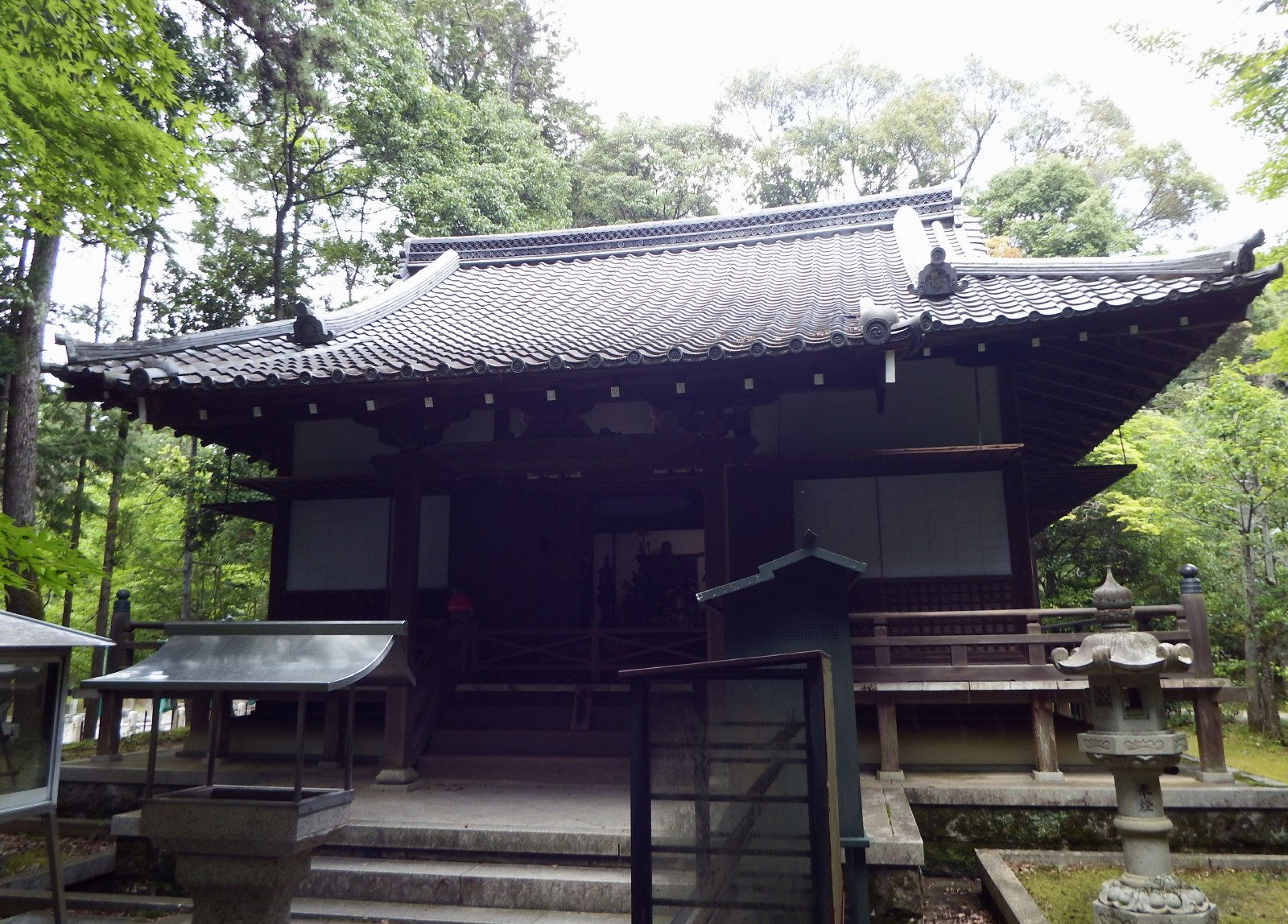
Soshi-dō

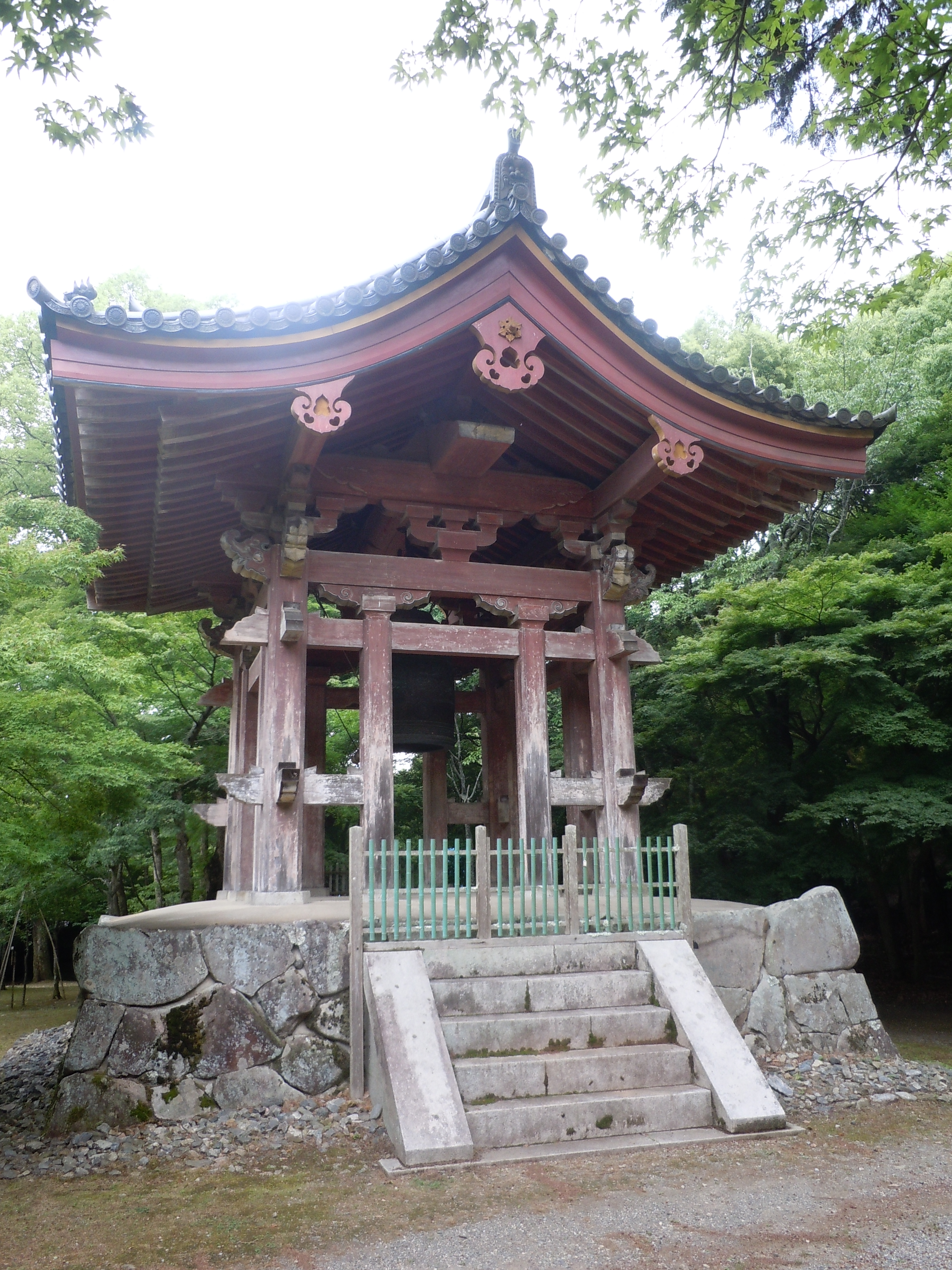
Shōrō

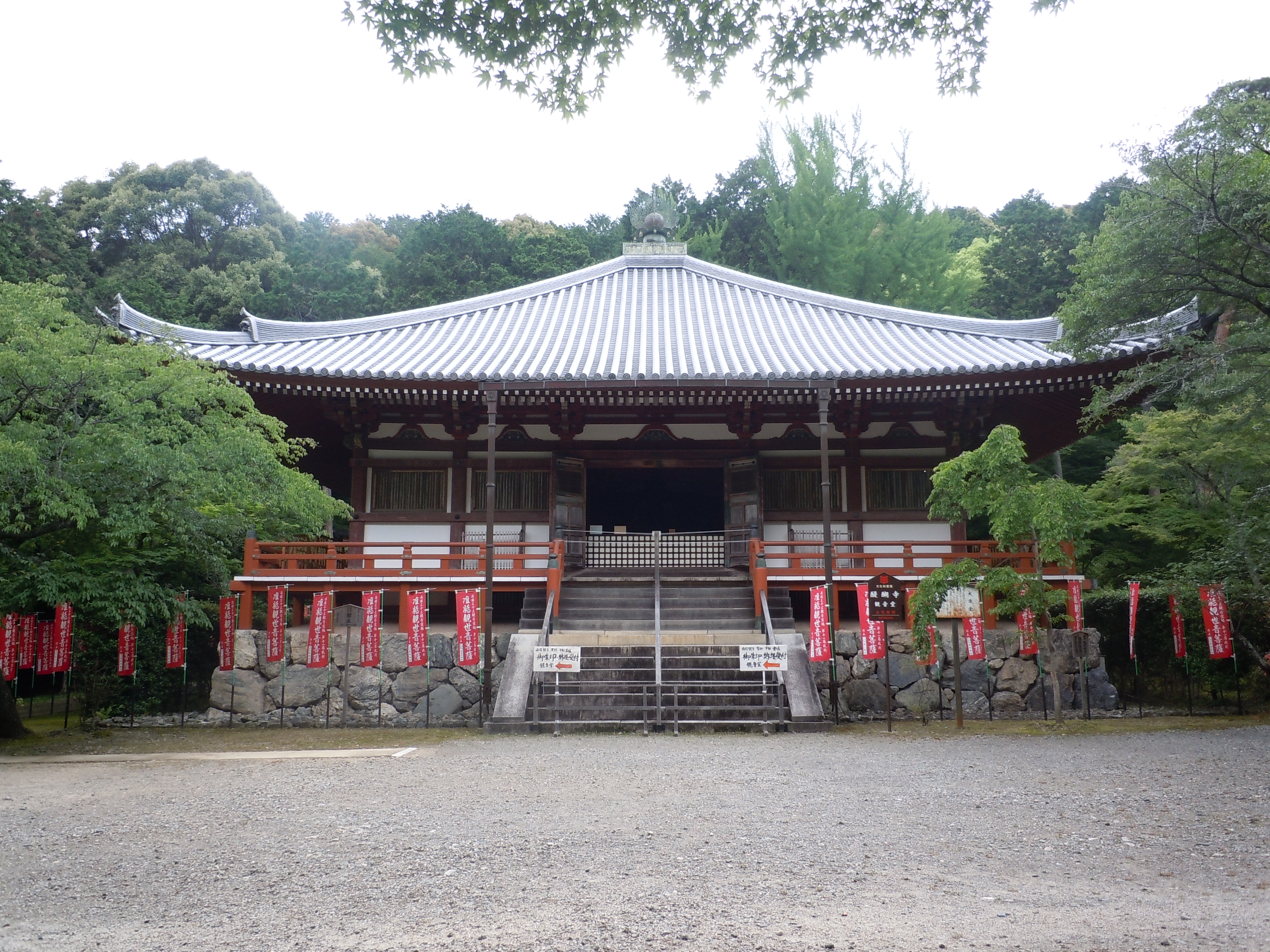
Kannon-dō

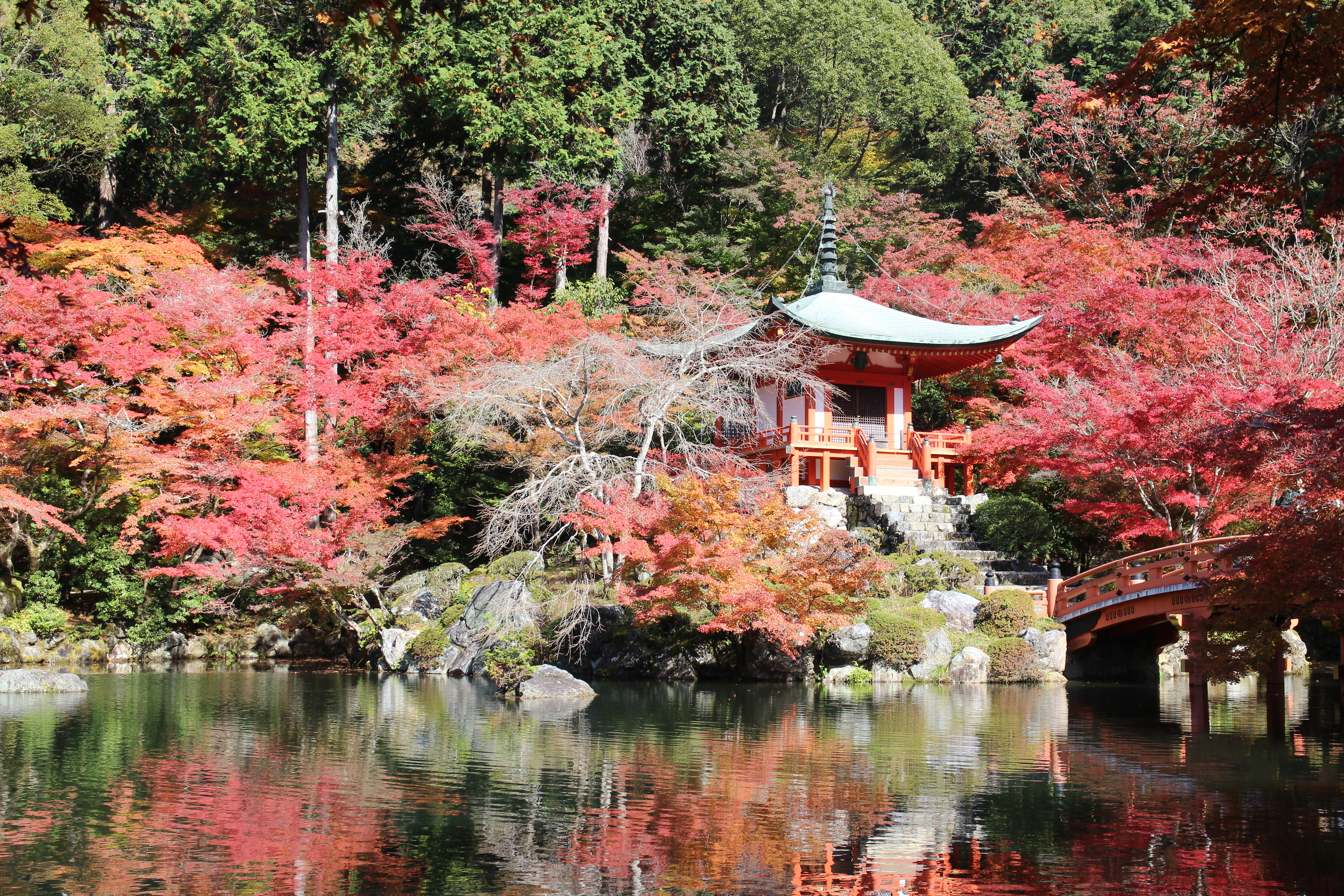
Benten-dō in autumn

=== Kami-Daigo ===
The Kami-Daigo area is centered around the Kaisan-dō and Nyōirin-dō further up the mountain, (450m above sea level), and contained the Juntei-dō, the 11th of the Saigoku Pilgrimage route. It was founded by Shōhō in 876 along with the Nyōirin-dō. The Juntei-dō was destroyed by fire, most recently in 2008, and the Nyōirin-dō (Important Cultural Property) was rebuilt in 1606 by Toyotomi Hideyori. It is a suspended structure. The Kaisan-dō (Important Cultural Property) was founded in 911 by Kanken, the first abbot of Daigo-ji. It was rebuilt during the Kamakura period but fell into disrepair and rebuilt again in 1606 by Toyotomi Hideyori. The inner sanctuary houses a seated portrait statue Shōhō and other items.

Other notable structures in this area include the Yakushi-dō (National Treasure) - Founded in 913 by Shōhō at the request of Emperor Daigo as a hall of imperial prayer. The current hall was rebuilt in 1121. It has a gabled roof and a cypress bark roof. It has 5 bays in front and 4 bays on the sides. Of the 4 bays between pillars on the sides, the 2 central bays are narrow, while the 1 bay at the front and 1 bay at the back are wide, which is unusual. Inside were enshrined statues of the Yakushi Triad (National Treasure), Enma, Taishaku-ten, and Senju Kannon (all Important Cultural Properties), but these have all now been moved to the Reihokan Museum in Shimo-Daigo.

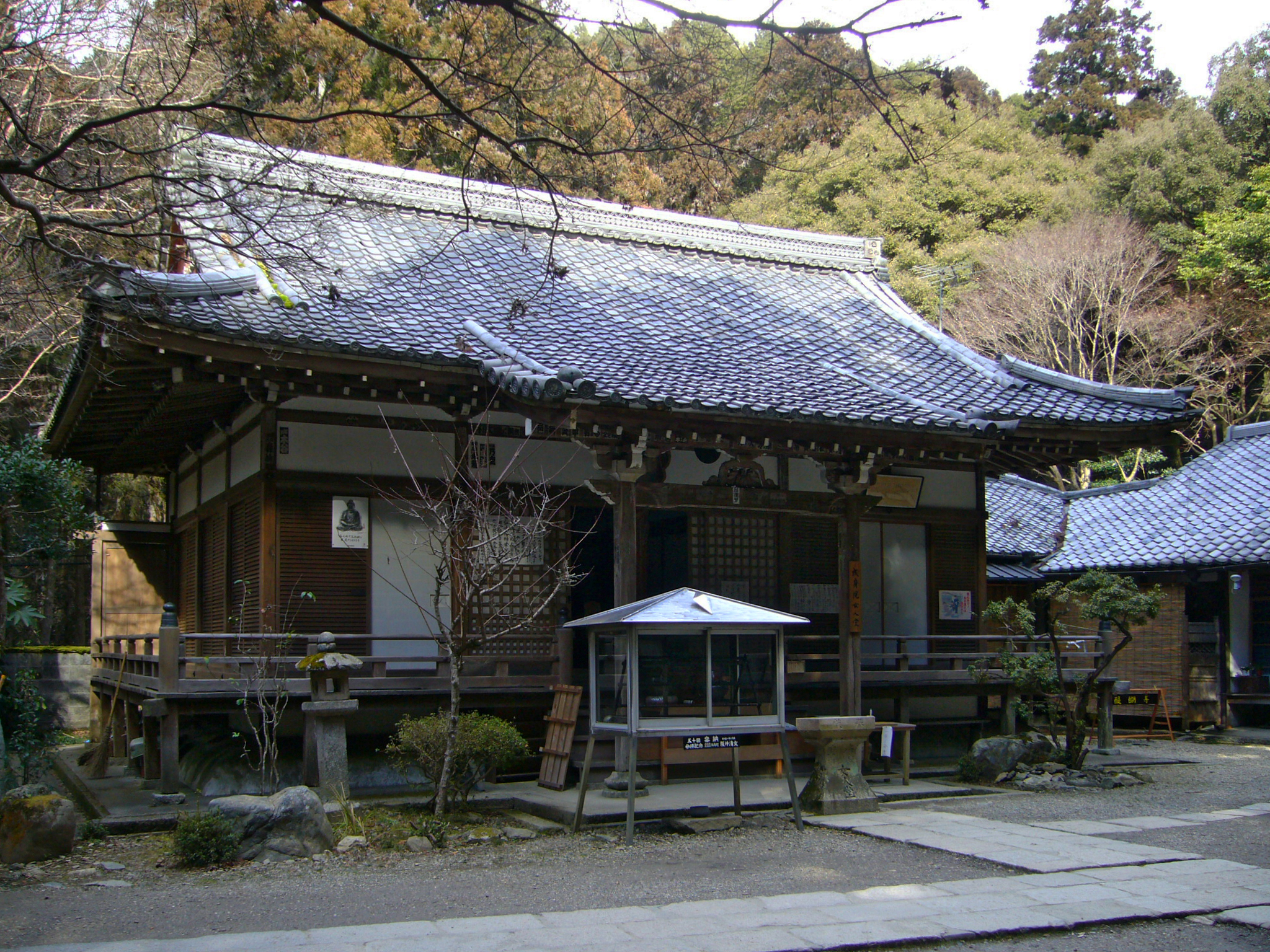
Nyonindō

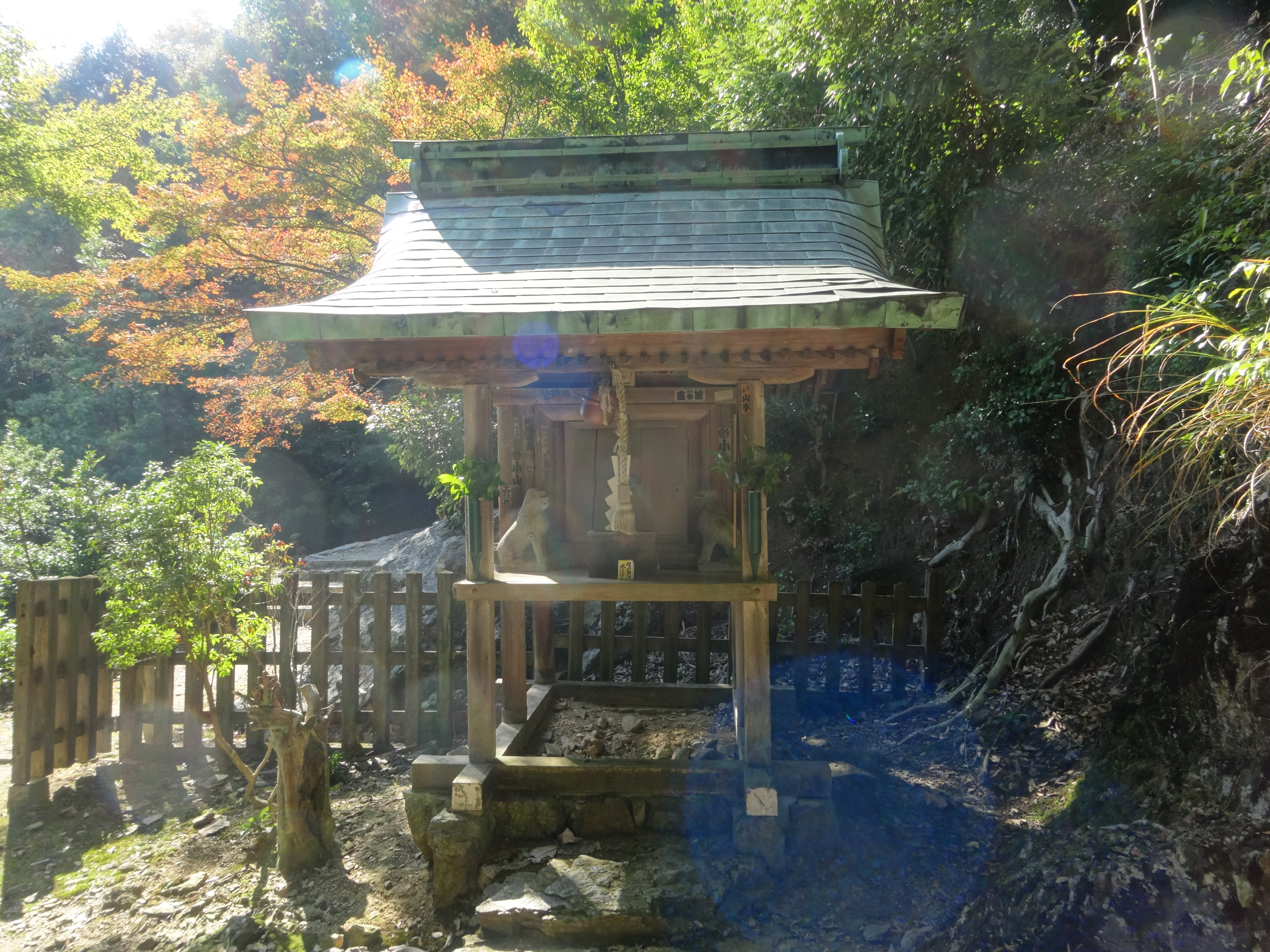
Yokoo Daimyōjin

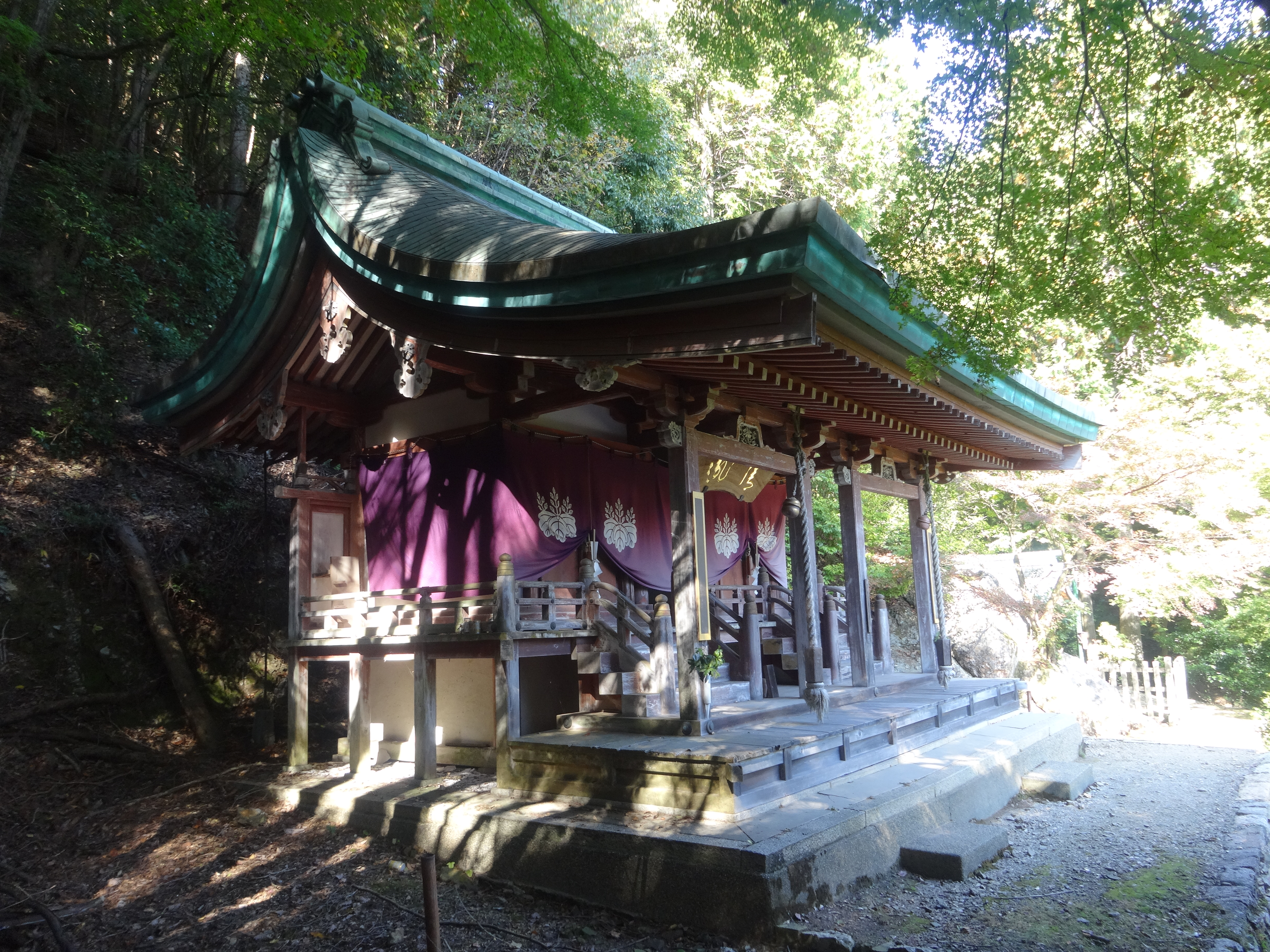
Seiryu-gu Honden

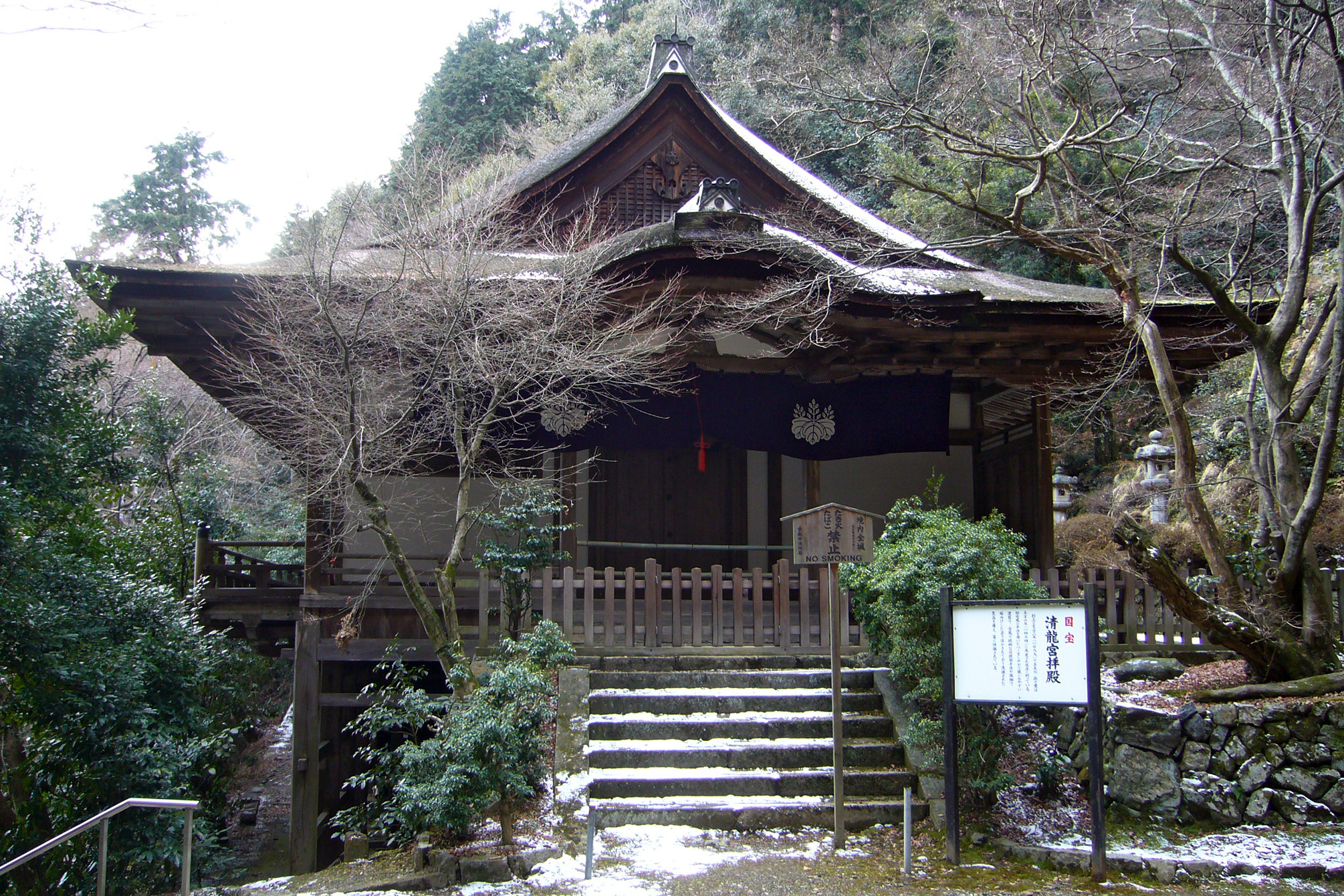
Seiryu-gu Haiden（NT）

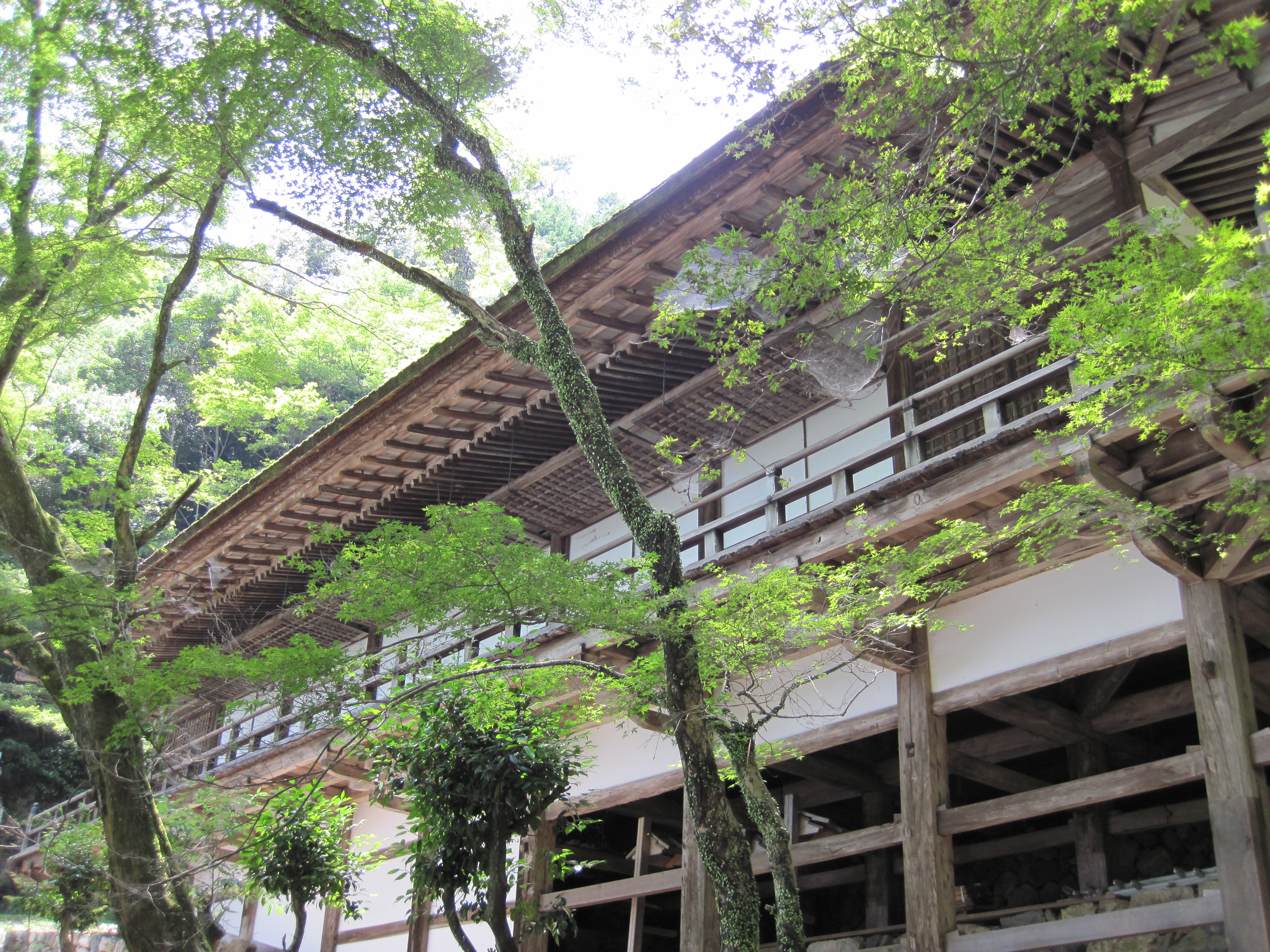
Seiryu-gu Haiden（NT）from south

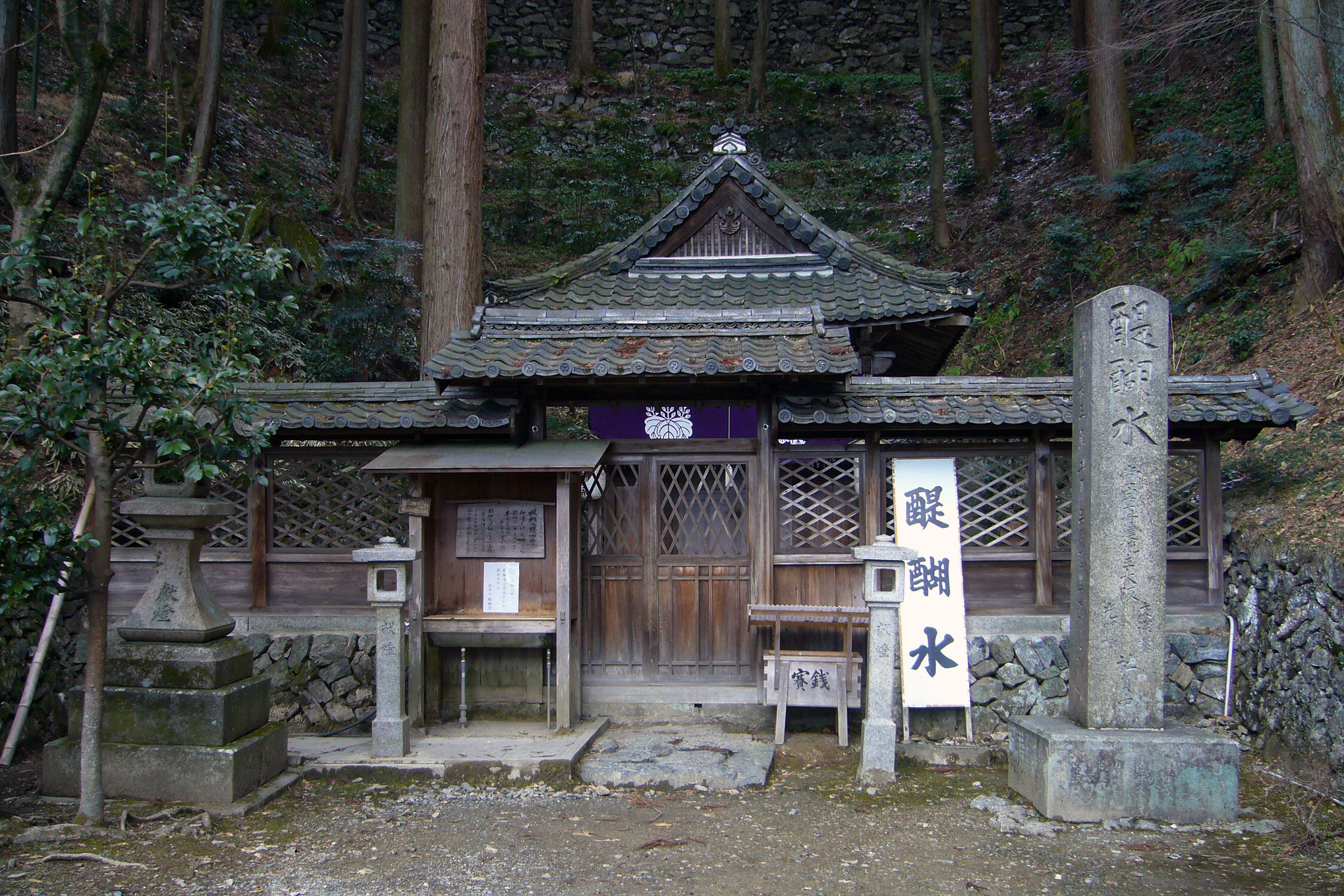
Daigo-sui

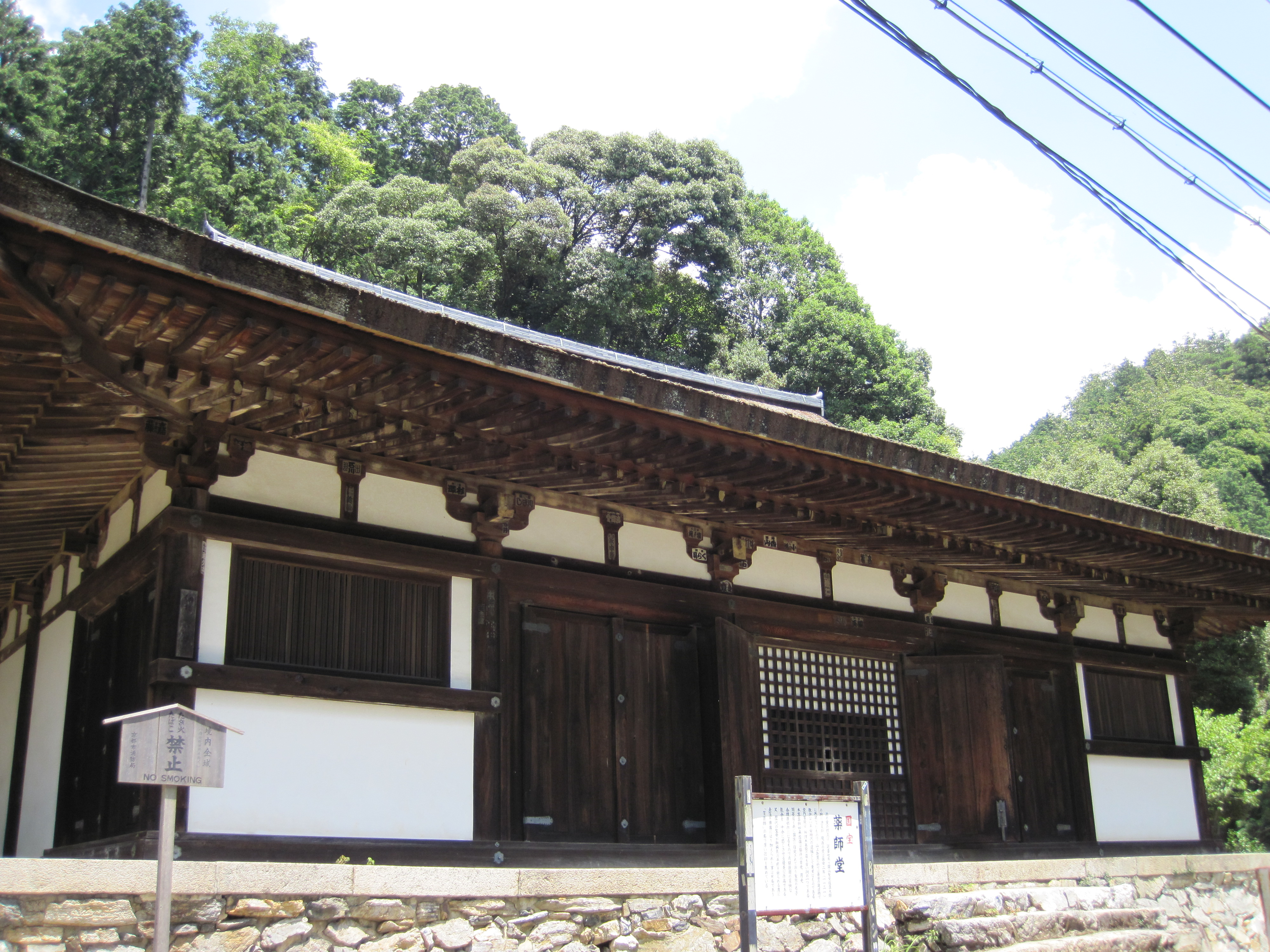
Yakushi-dō（NT）

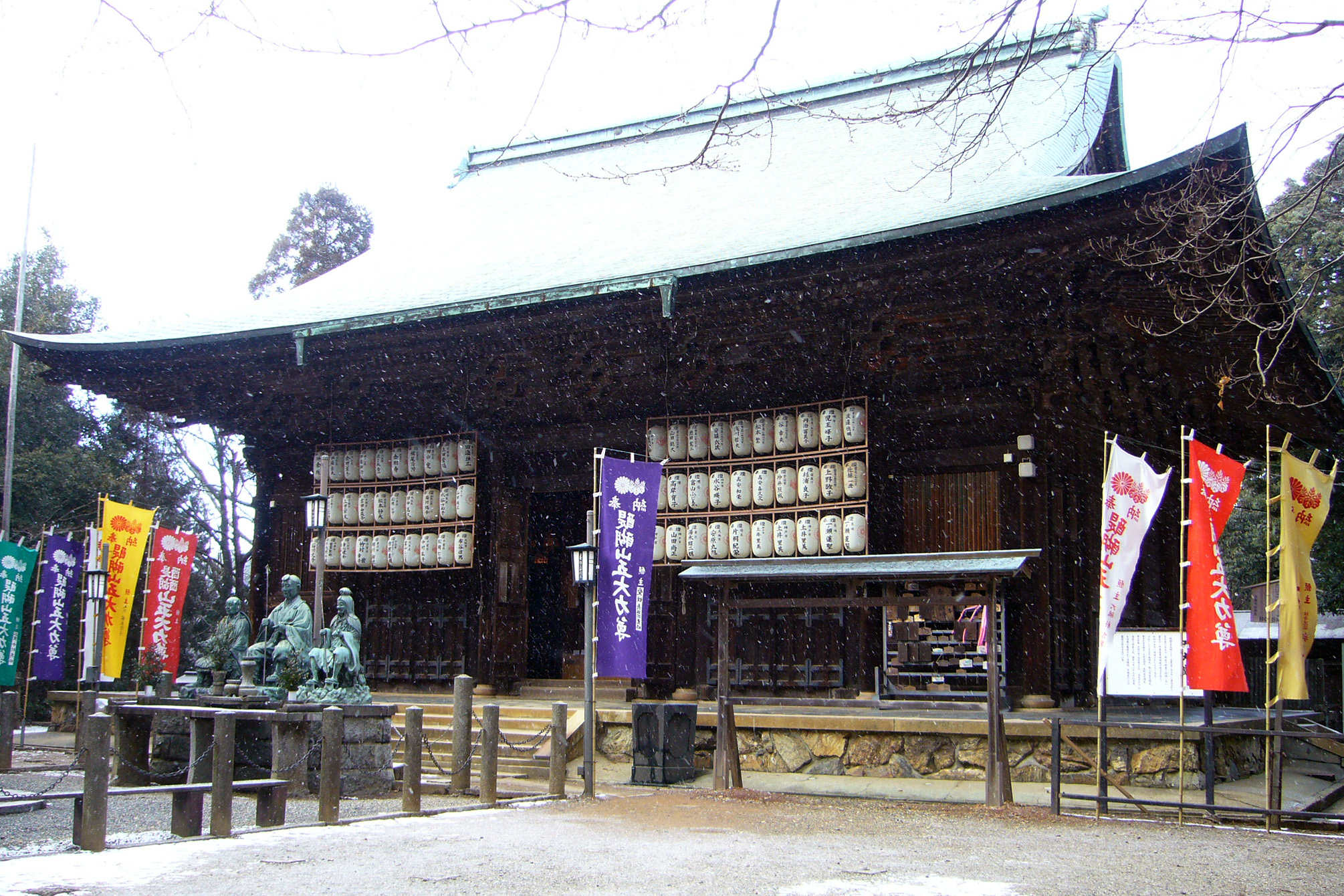
Godai-dō

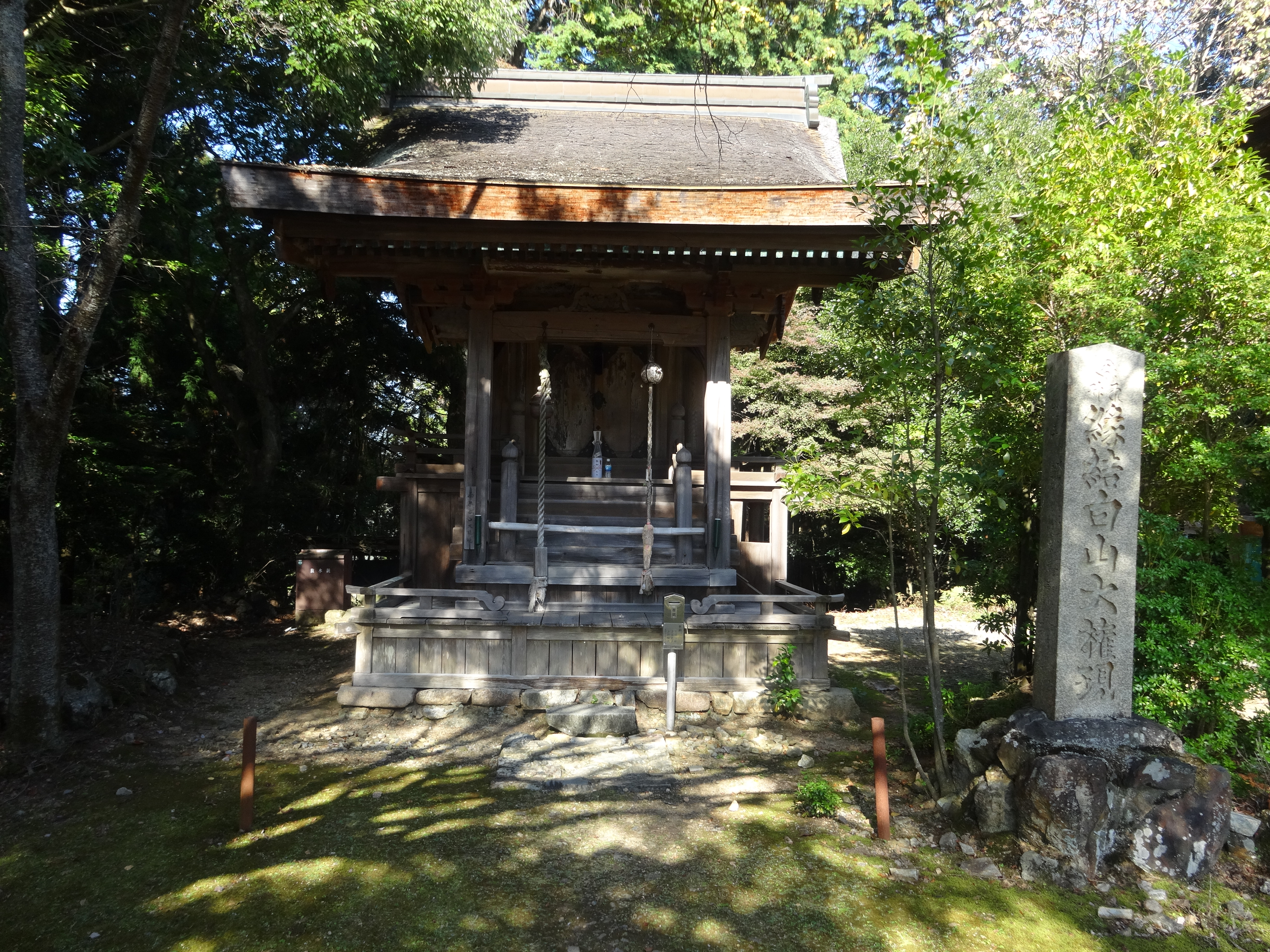
Enmusubi Hakusan Daigongen

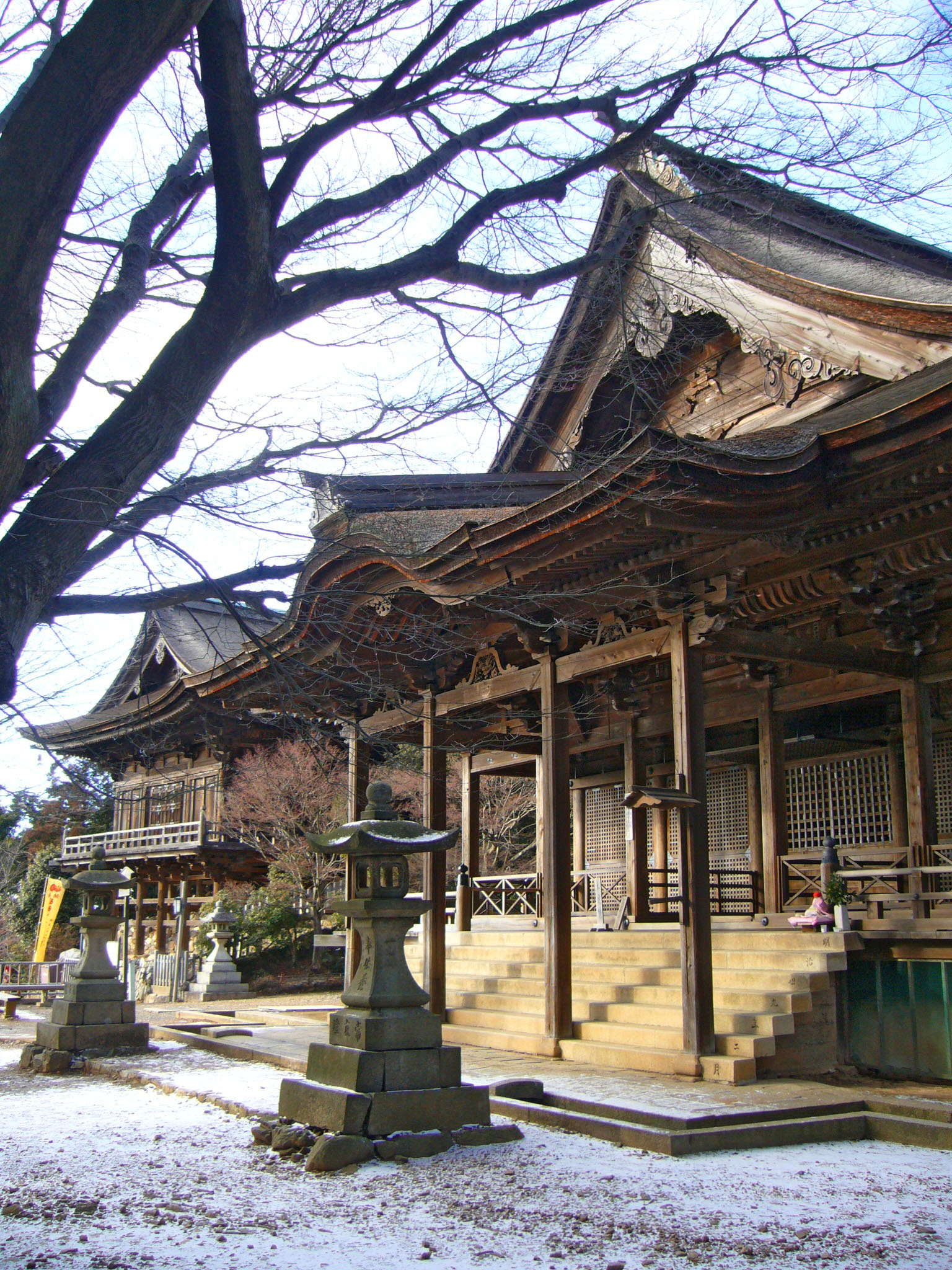
Nyōirin-dō and Kaisan-dō

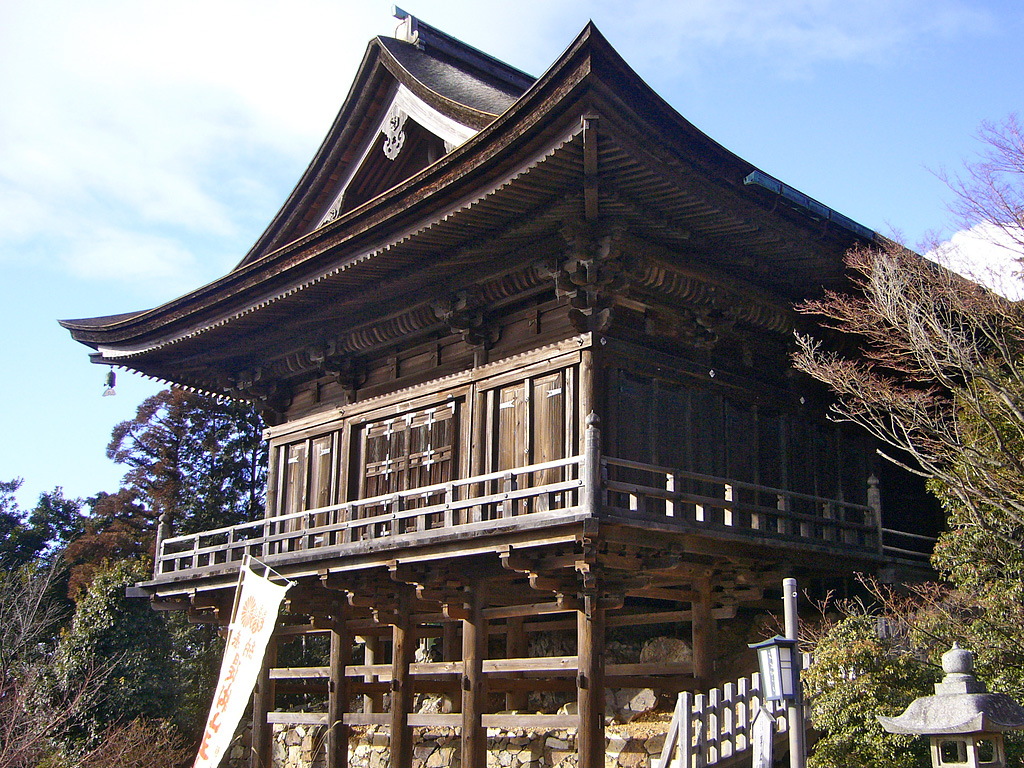
Nyōirin-dō（ICP）

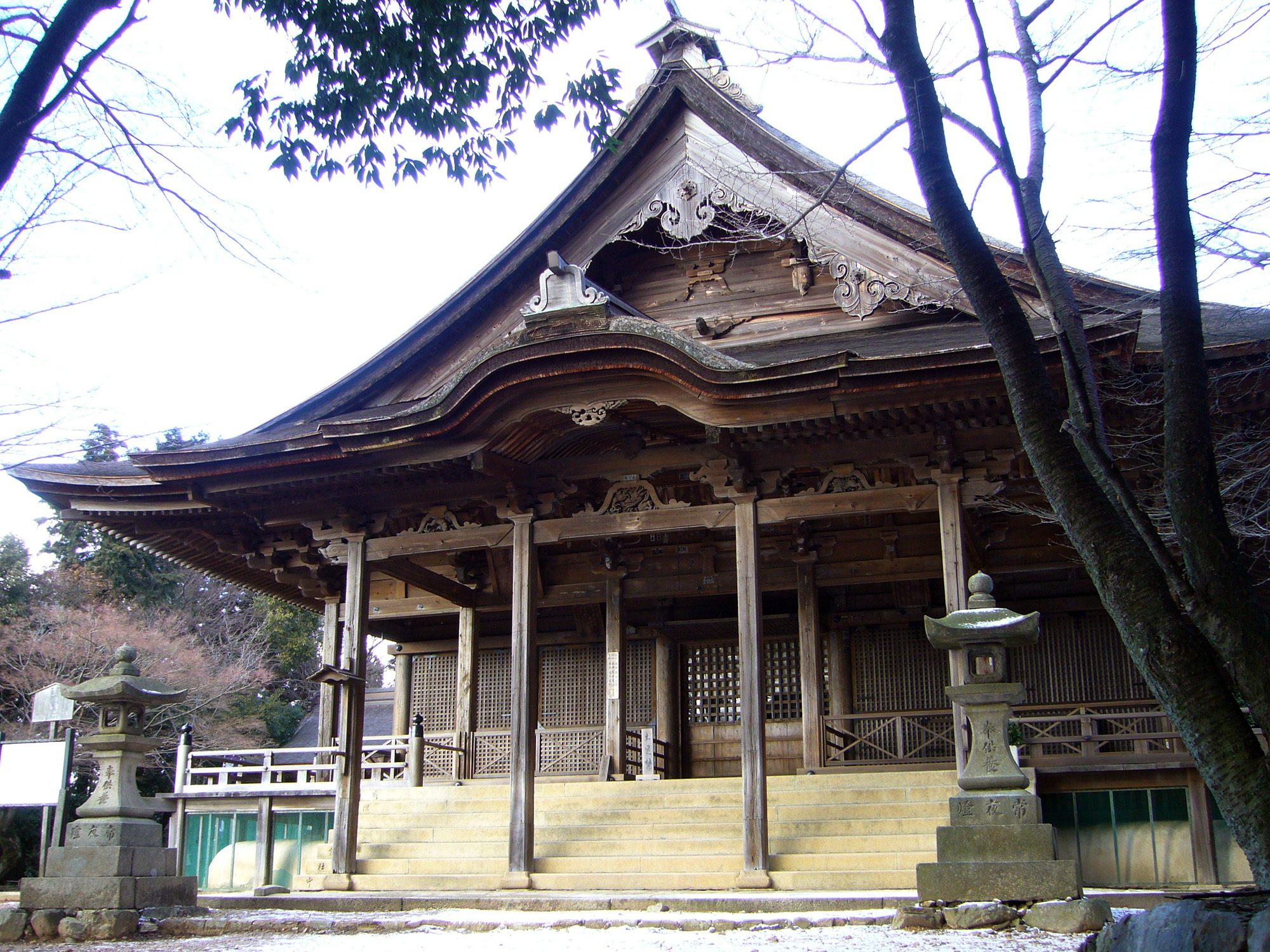
Kaisan-dō（ICP）

== Sanbō-in Garden ==
More than seven centuries after its founding, Toyotomi Hideyoshi held a famous cherry blossom viewing party called Daigo no hanami in 1598 at the Sambō-in sub-temple.

The bright colors of maple leaves attract tourists and others in the autumn season. Emperor Suzaku's mausoleum, known as Daigo no misasagi, is located near Daigo-ji.

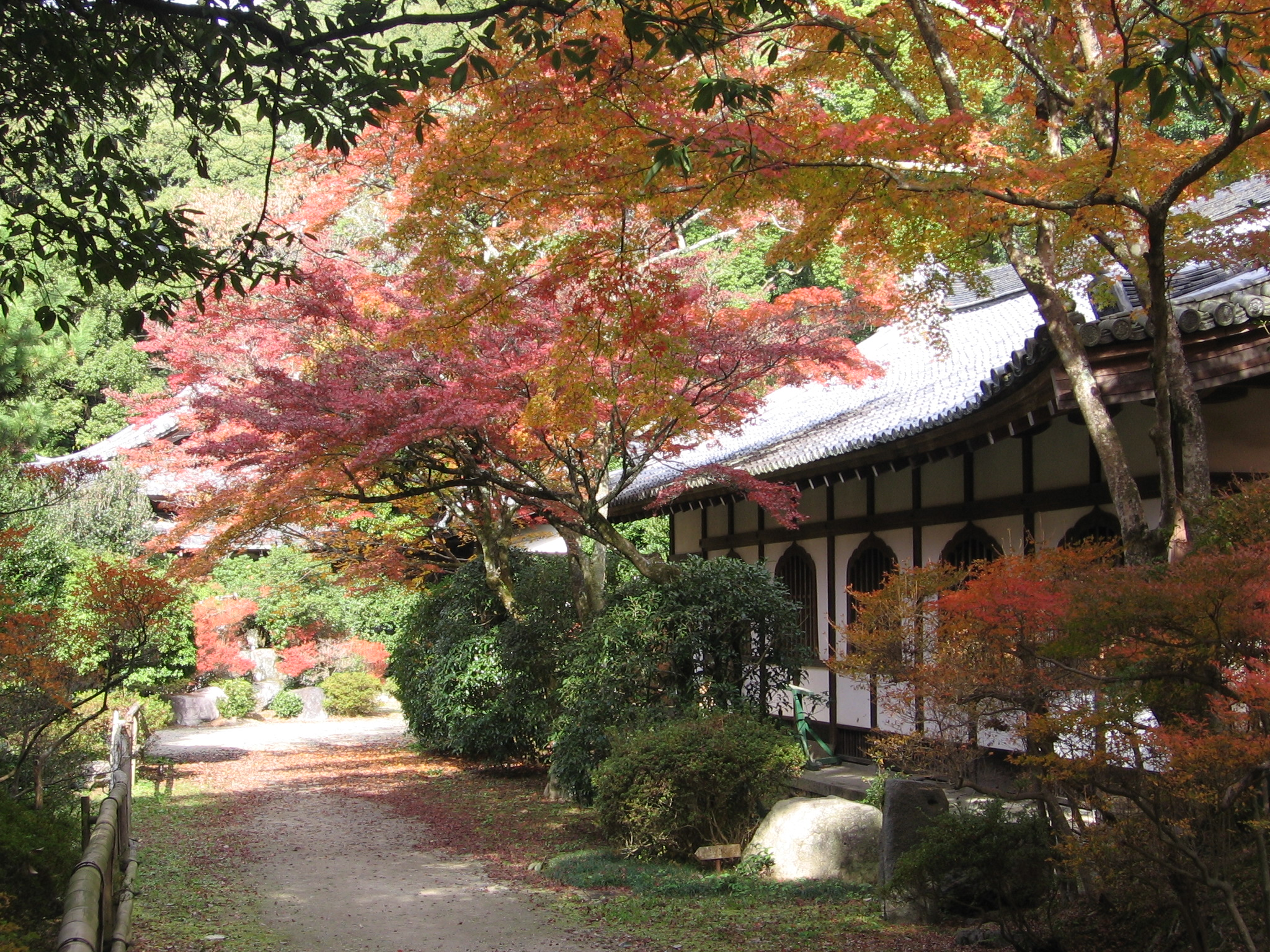
Autumn color from Acer palmatum (momiji) at Daigo-ji

Within Sambō-in, the Momoyama-period strolling pond garden laid out under Toyotomi Hideyoshi in 1598—and further developed in the early Edo period—was designed for viewing from the Omote-shoin and combines chisen-kaiyū and karesansui elements around a central pond with islands, bridges and a multi-stage waterfall. The Sambō-in garden is designated by the Japanese government as both a Tokubetsu shiseki (Special Historic Site) and a Tokubetsu meishō (Special Place of Scenic Beauty): it was first listed as a Historic Site/Place of Scenic Beauty in 1927 and elevated to "Special" status in 1952.

== Cultural Properties ==
=== Structures ===
- Daigo-ji Kondō (醍醐寺金堂), late Heian period (1086–1184)
- Daigo-ji Five-Story Pagoda (醍醐寺五重塔), mid-Heian period (952);
- Daigo-ji Seiryu-gu Haiden (清滝宮拝殿（上醍醐）), mid-Muromachi period (1434)
- Daigo-ji Yakushi-dō (醍醐寺薬師堂), late-Heian period (1121);
- Sanbo-in Karamon (三宝院唐門), Azuchi-Momoyama period (1573–1614);
- Sanbo-in Ura-Shoin (三宝院表書院), Azuchi-Momoyama period (1598);

=== Paintings ===
- Colored silk painting of Five Great Buddhas (絹本著色五大尊像), Kamakura period;
- Colored silk painting of Monju Bosatsu Nautical Map (絹本著色文殊渡海図), Kamakura period;
- Colored silk painting of Kishibojin (絹本著色訶梨帝母像), Kamakura period;
- Colored silk painting of Enma-ten (絹本著色閻魔天像), Kamakura period;
- Murals in Five-story Pagoda (五重塔初重壁画(板絵著色)), Heian period (951); 18 panels
- Silk painting of the Two Worlds Mandala (両界曼荼羅図), Kamakura period; 4 pcs central pillar cover panel painting, 7 panel paintings
- Colored illustrated sutra of Cause & Effect (紙本著色絵因果経), Nara period;

=== Statuary ===
- Wooden statue of standing Kokuzō Bosatsu (木造虚空蔵菩薩立像), Heian period
- Wooden statues of Yakushi Nyorai and attendants (木造薬師如来及両脇侍像（薬師堂安置）), Heian period;

=== Other ===
- Preface to the Mahavairocana Sutra, written by Kobo Daishi (大日経開題 弘法大師筆), Heian period;
- Emperor Go-Uda's Letter of Admonitions to the Master of the School of Shoryu (後宇多天皇宸翰当流紹隆教誡（三通)), Kamakura period; three letters
- Emperor Go-Daigo's Shinkan Tencho Inshin (waxcloth) (後醍醐天皇宸翰天長印信（蠟牋）), Nanboku-cho period (1339)
- Tanuki brush offering inscription, said to have been written by Kobo Daishi (狸毛筆奉献表 伝弘法大師筆), Heian period
- Rigen Daishi handwritten disposition (理源大師筆処分状), Heian period (907)
- Daigo-ji Documents (醍醐寺文書聖教), Heian-Meiji period; 69393 items
- Sung edition of complete canon (宋版一切経), South Sung Dynasty (12th century); 6,102 volumes in 604 boxes

== See also ==
- List of Buddhist temples in Kyoto
- List of National Treasures of Japan (temples)
- List of National Treasures of Japan (ancient documents)
- List of National Treasures of Japan (paintings)
- List of National Treasures of Japan (sculptures)
- List of National Treasures of Japan (writings)
- List of Historic Sites of Japan (Kyoto)
- List of Places of Scenic Beauty of Japan (Kyoto)
