= Makimuku ruins =

Ruins in Japan

Makimuku Site
- 纒向遺跡 (Japanese)
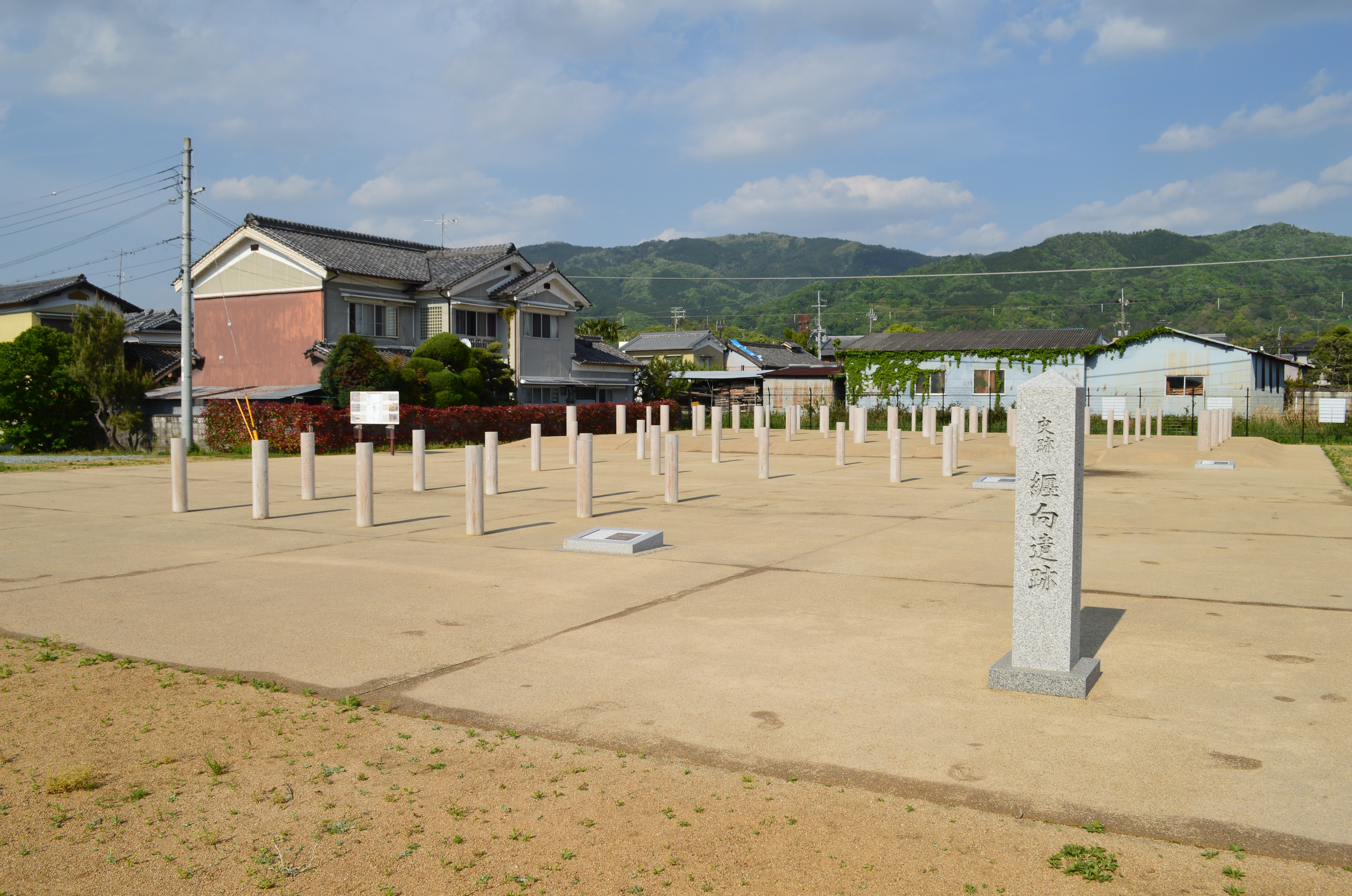
- Makimuku Site

- Fukuichi site Makimuku ruins (Japan)
- Interactive map of Makimuku Site
- 34°32′45.81″N 135°50′24.71″E
- Type: Settlement trace
- Periods: Yayoi - Kofun period
- Location: Sakurai, Nara, Japan
- Region: Kansai region

Site notes
- Public access: Yes

The Makimuku ruins (纒向遺跡, Makimuku iseki) is an archaeological site with the traces of a late-Yayoi period (2nd century) to early-Kofun period (4th century) settlement located at the northwest foot of Mount Miwa of the city of Sakurai, Nara Prefecture, in the Kansai region of Japan. It was designated a National Historic Site in 2013.

Some researchers consider the area to be the birthplace of the Kofun system. There is a theory that they are the center of Yamatai, and six ancient burial mounds such as Hashihaka Kofun are distributed.

== Location and site outline ==
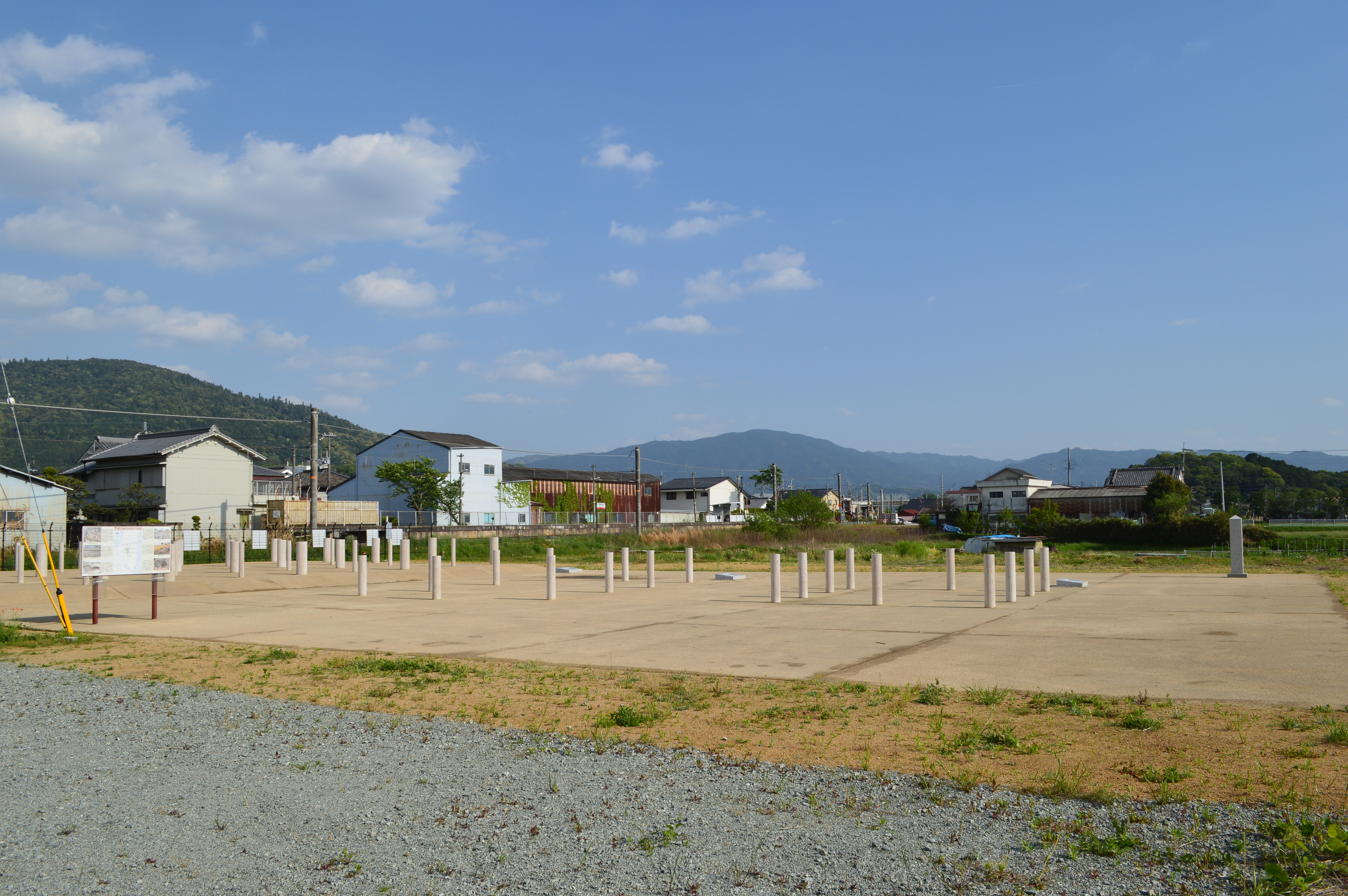
Tsuji District, distant viewJR Sakurai Line Makimuku Station at the back of the building remains. To the rear left is Mount Miwa and to the far right is the Hashihaka Kofun.

Located in Ota, Tsuji, and Higashida neighborhoods of Sakurai, this large settlement was located on an alluvial fan formed by the Makimukagawa River, a tributary of the Hatsuse River. In the Tsuji area to the east, there were two artificial ditches, 5 meters wide and one meter deep, that merged midway and had a weir. In some places, the banks were protected by driving sheet piles into the ground, and in other places, water collection basins were built, and a large amount of earthenware from the early Kofun period has been excavated from the ditches. In addition to the above, there are many excellent wooden vessels such as boat-shaped and bird-shaped wooden vessels, agricultural tools, and discs with complex arc patterns. Since 1971, the Kashihara Archaeological Institute has conducted surveys and confirmed the existence of six settlements and tomb groups connected by a single water system within an area of 2.5 kilometers east to west and 2 kilometers north to south. There are over 40 prehistoric storage pits and linear waterways on the fringes of the settlements. The bottoms of the pits reach the spring water layer, and excavated pottery and wooden artifacts from these pits is thought to have been used in agricultural rituals, weaving tools, winnowing baskets, burnt wood, and large amounts of rice husks. some 30% of the early Kofun period remains are from other regions, such as eastern and western Tokai, Hokuriku, Sanin, the Osaka Bay coast, central and western Setouchi, and Kyushu, indicating diverse exchanges with each region. The site contains fragments of dotaku bronze bells and large number of Yayoi pottery fragments from the middle and late Yayoi periods and the remains of pit dwellings and post-hole buildings into the Asuka period. Only a small portion of the site has been excavated.

Adjacent to these two areas are the Yazuka Kofun and Ishizuka Kofun, whose moats have yielded a large amount of pottery, and the shape of the moat indicates that it is a scallop-shaped keyhole-shaped kofun measuring approximately 90 meters in length. Together with other nearby tombs, it forms the Makimuku Kofun Cluster, which and some researchers believe (together with the Hashihaka Kofun located approximately one kilometer to the south), to be linked to Yamataikoku or the "Early Yamato Government."

== Excavations ==
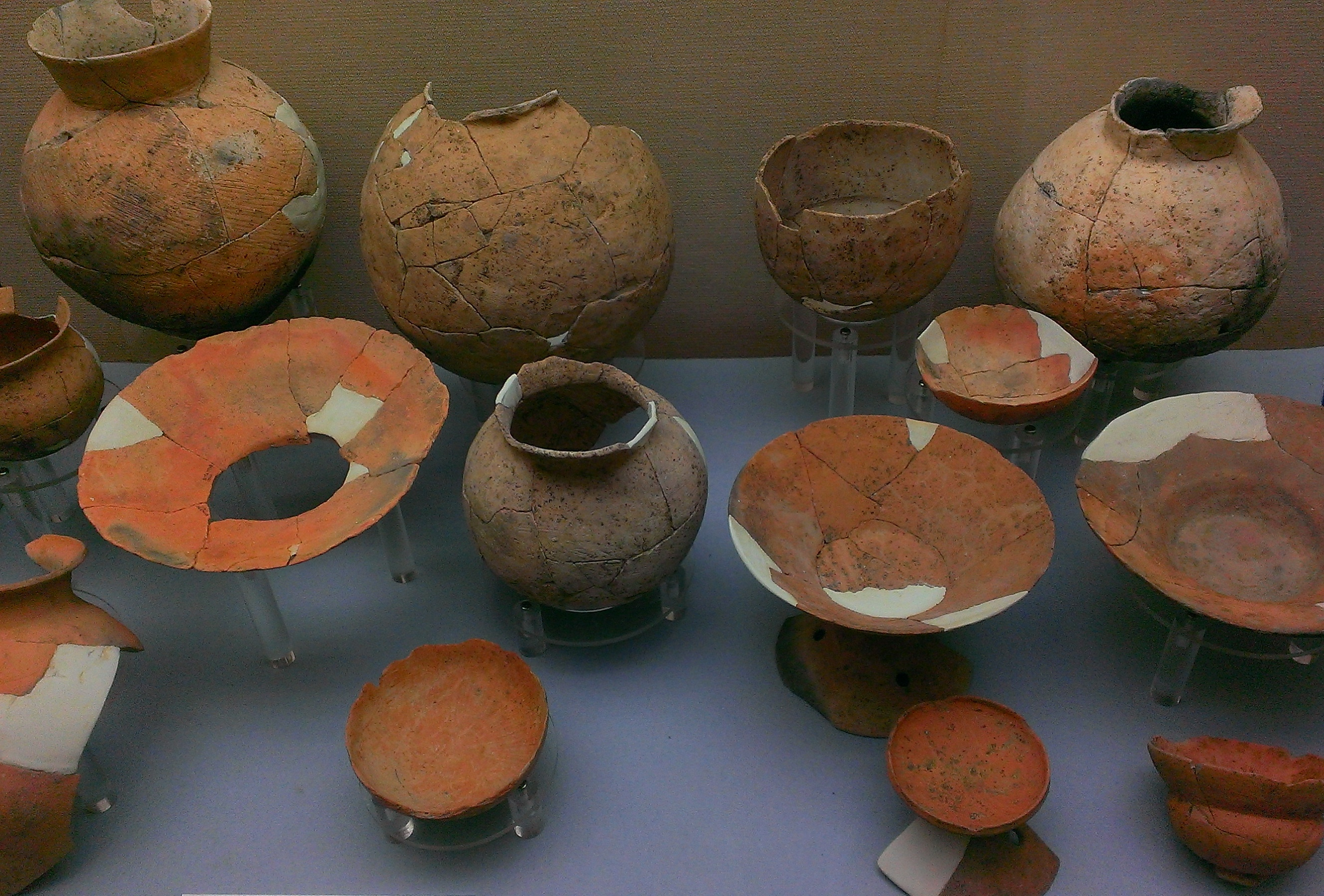
Artifacts from the early Kofun period excavated in the 174th survey (2012). Sakurai City Archaeological Center Exhibition

The site of Makimuku was first introduced by Minoru Doi in 1937 as the "Ohta Site" in "Yamato Shi". Before it was called by its present name, it was known to the academic world as the "Ota Site" and "Katsuyama Site", and was recognized by researchers as one of a group of small sites, and did not attract any particular attention However, a plan to build prefectural housing and a primary school to promote the employment of coal mine leavers was brought up, which led to a preliminary survey by Archaeological Institute of Kashihara to carry out a preliminary survey. As a result, a canal-like structure with a width of 5m, a depth of 1m, and a total length of more than 200m was found, and local Man'yōshū researcher Yoshinobu Yoshioka and others suggested that it might be the remains of the Makimukugawa River, which appears in the Man'yōshū. From the remains of the river, special vessel bases were excavated, which have been found at the Kibi Tate Tsuki and Miyakizaka sites. After the fifteenth survey in 1977, the research was transferred from the Archaeological Institute of Kashihara to the Sakurai As of December 2008, only 5% of the site had been excavated.

In 2009 (Heisei 21), several Buildings were detected, and it has become clear that the site seems to be part of a City surrounded by fortifications.

On 17 September 2010, the Board of Education of Sakurai City, Nara Prefecture, announced that about 2,000 peach seeds were found in an oval-shaped "clay pit" (4.3 meters north–south, 2.2 meters east–west, 80 centimeters deep) dug in the 3rd century, about 4 meters south of the remains of a large building. Peach seeds are used as offerings in ancient rituals and are often found in Yayoi period ruins, but this is the largest number of seeds unearthed in one place in Japan. In 2011, more than six types of fish bones and scales were found at the site, including red seabream, horsefish, mackerel and common carp. They also announced that they had found over a thousand animal bones, including those of wild boars, deer, and ducks.

=== Main Detected Remains ===
It is about 10 times larger than the Karako-Kagi site and larger than the Taga Castle site, which was a major military base in the Tohoku region. There are also traces of urban planning throughout the site.

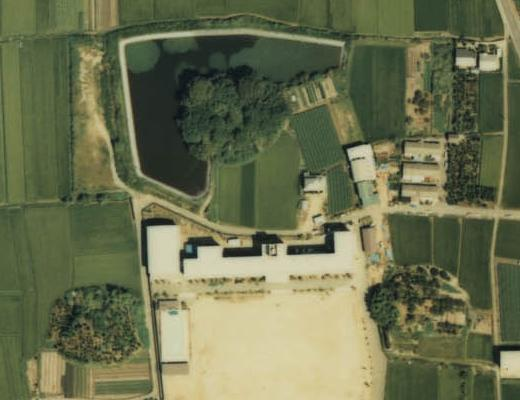
The three tumuli are surrounded by the Makimuku Katsuyama tumulus (top), the Yatsuka tumulus (bottom left) and the Ishizuka tumulus (bottom right), and the Makimuku Elementary School is located between them.

- Two huge linear waterways, 5m wide and 1m deep, revetted with sheet piles and known as the "North Ditch" and "South Ditch".

- South ditch: extends from the Makimuki River near the tip of the protruding part of the Hashihaka Tomb in a northwesterly direction towards the present-day Garoshi Elementary School. The source of the water is the circumference moat of the Hashihaka Tomb. Behind the moat is the Kunizu Shrine, which reaches the present-day Makimuki River.
- North Ditch: extends from the former Anashi River in the north-east towards the south-west. The source of the water is the old Makimuki River.
The confluence of the two ditches is located on the grounds of the Makimuku Elementary School, and is estimated to be 2,600m long. It connects with the Yamato River, which in turn connects to the distant open sea.

- Spring water was found at the bottom, and the interior is divided into three main layers. About 150 irregularly shaped circular pits with one side protruding, about 3m in diameter and 1.5m deep, were found.
- The remains of dugout pillar buildings and the remains of accompanying buildings (a building of the first half of the Kofun period with a floor space of about 23 m^{2} in 2×3 rooms, the remains of a collapsed house and wooden products with black lacquered arcs, a small house of 1×1 rooms and a total pillar building of 2×2 rooms and wooden products with black lacquered arcs, a stone monument of the former site of the Tamaki Palace in Tamaki, and the existence of a palace residence are suspected. In addition, 17 dugout pillar buildings were found.)
- Pit-house

However, there were not many pit dwellings, and it is likely that the buildings were built on stilts.

- V-shaped compartmental ditch with arcaded panels, earthworks and fence rows
- Remains of a water-conducting facility (possibly a palace drainage facility)
- Ritual site (a jasper jade, a cusp, a tubular jade, a small glass jade, and pottery from the second half of the 4th century were excavated from the traditional site of Emperor Keiko's palace in Anashi-Doyodo district)
- Iron-making site – Metalsmith site with Tsukushi-shaped blowpipe. It is estimated to date from the late 4th century, when iron was smelted in the Kinai region.
- Fences around the settlement.
- Ancient burial mounds scattered around the site (Makimuku Kofun Group)

There is also the possibility that many buried tombs, which cannot be seen above ground, are buried underground.

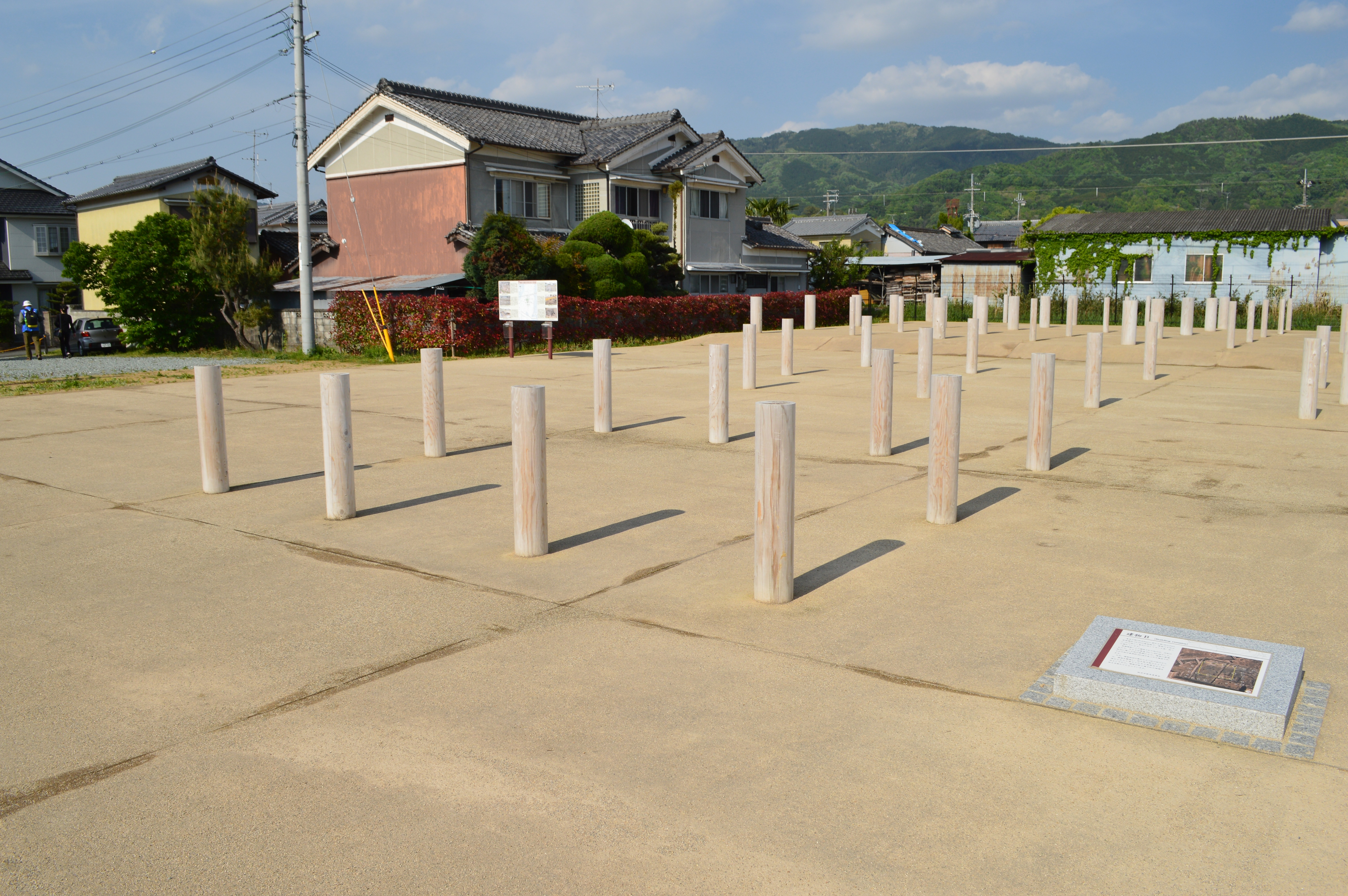
Tsuji Area Building B

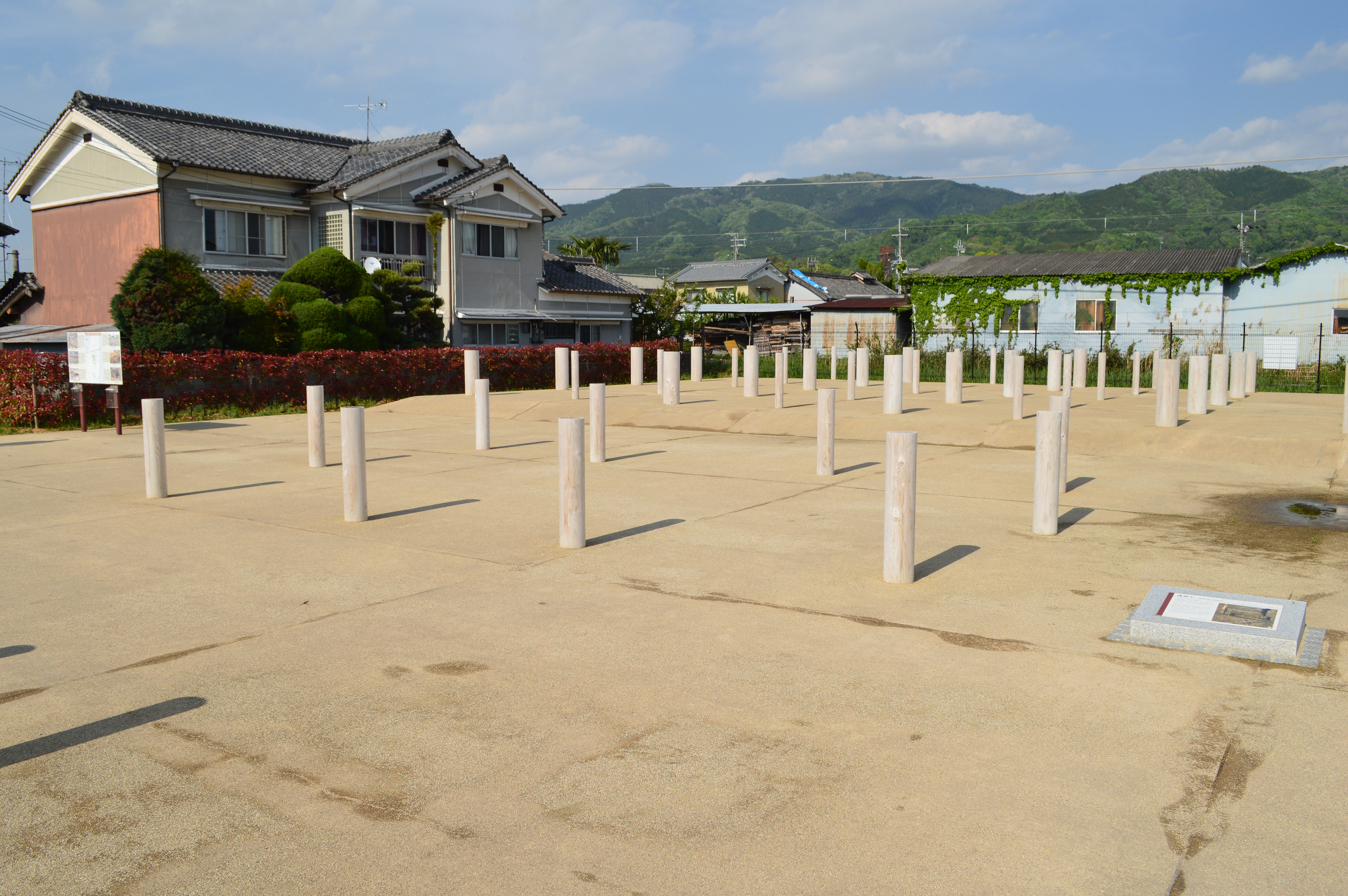
Tsuji Area Building C

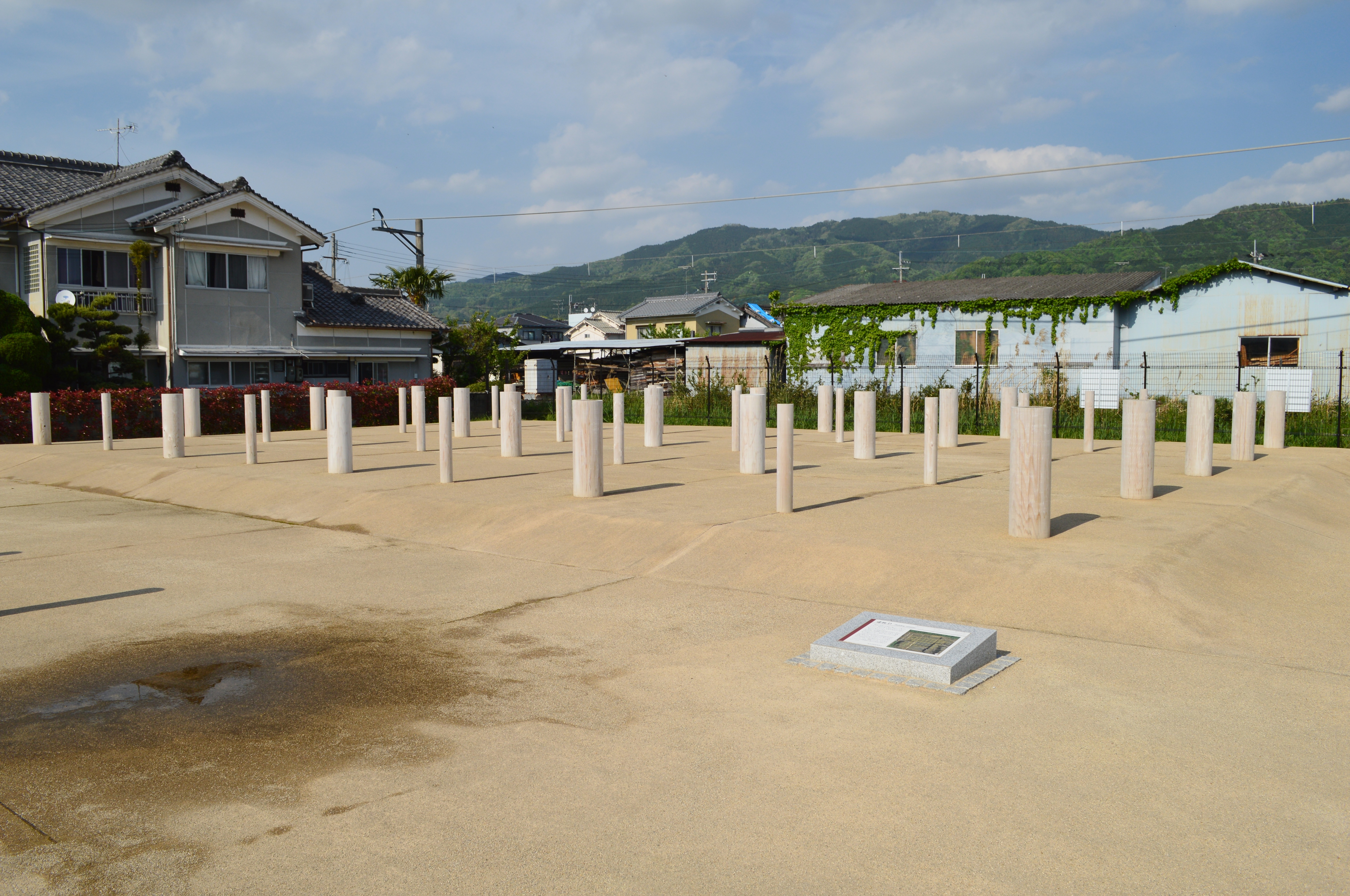
Tsuji Area Building D

=== Main excavated artifacts ===
- Earthenwares from the late Yayoi period to the early Kofun period were excavated, and the Yayoi potteries and Haji pottery. According to them, the five periods are Yayoi pottery style V (Makimuku 1), Shonai pottery (Makimuku 2, Makimuku 3 and Makimuku 4) and Nururu I (Makimuku 5). However, the dates are based on the C14 dating method, which may be more than 100 years old.
- Vermilion-painted chicken-shaped wooden product
- A wooden product known as an 'arc-shaped circular plate', with a design combining straight and curved lines, believed to have its origins in the Kibi region.
- Drawstring bag made of silk However, silk was not produced in the Kinai region until the 4th century.
- Tiled earthenware (Pottery fragments were excavated in 1996 (Heisei 8). Analyses of the composition of the clay components confirmed in 2001 that the pottery was unique in Japan, and that it was made using techniques from the Korean Peninsula.
- A miniature boat
- Wooden arrowheads
- Iwami-type shield-shaped wooden wares
- a large number of imported pottery (exotic pottery).

However, there is a lack of conclusive evidence to date the site, such as the absence of bronze mirrors, swords, jade beads and iron objects, so it is not possible to say definitively that this was the site of the Yamatai Kingdom.

Proportion of the area of origin of the pottery brought in
Ise and Tokai region	49%
Hokuriku and San-in region	17%
Kawachi region	10%
Kibi region	7%
Omi region	5%
Kanto region	5%
Harima region	3%
Western Seto Inland Sea region	3%
Kii region	1%

Artifacts have been unearthed from all over Japan, but most of them were made in Ise Province, which is adjacent to Yamato Province and has had a close relationship with the country since ancient times. Ise Province, which was adjacent to Yamato Province and had close relations with Ise Bay, and Owari Province, which is located to the east across Ise Bay. In addition to the pottery brought in, there is a large amount of pottery that was made in Yamato but is said to have regional characteristics, and the proportion of such pottery is higher at Ritual-related sites (30% of all pottery excavated at many sites). In addition, although these exotic pottery and artifacts are found from Kyushu to Kanto and the Sea of Japan side, there is very little pottery of Kyushu or Korean origin, suggesting that this site had little trade with the continent.

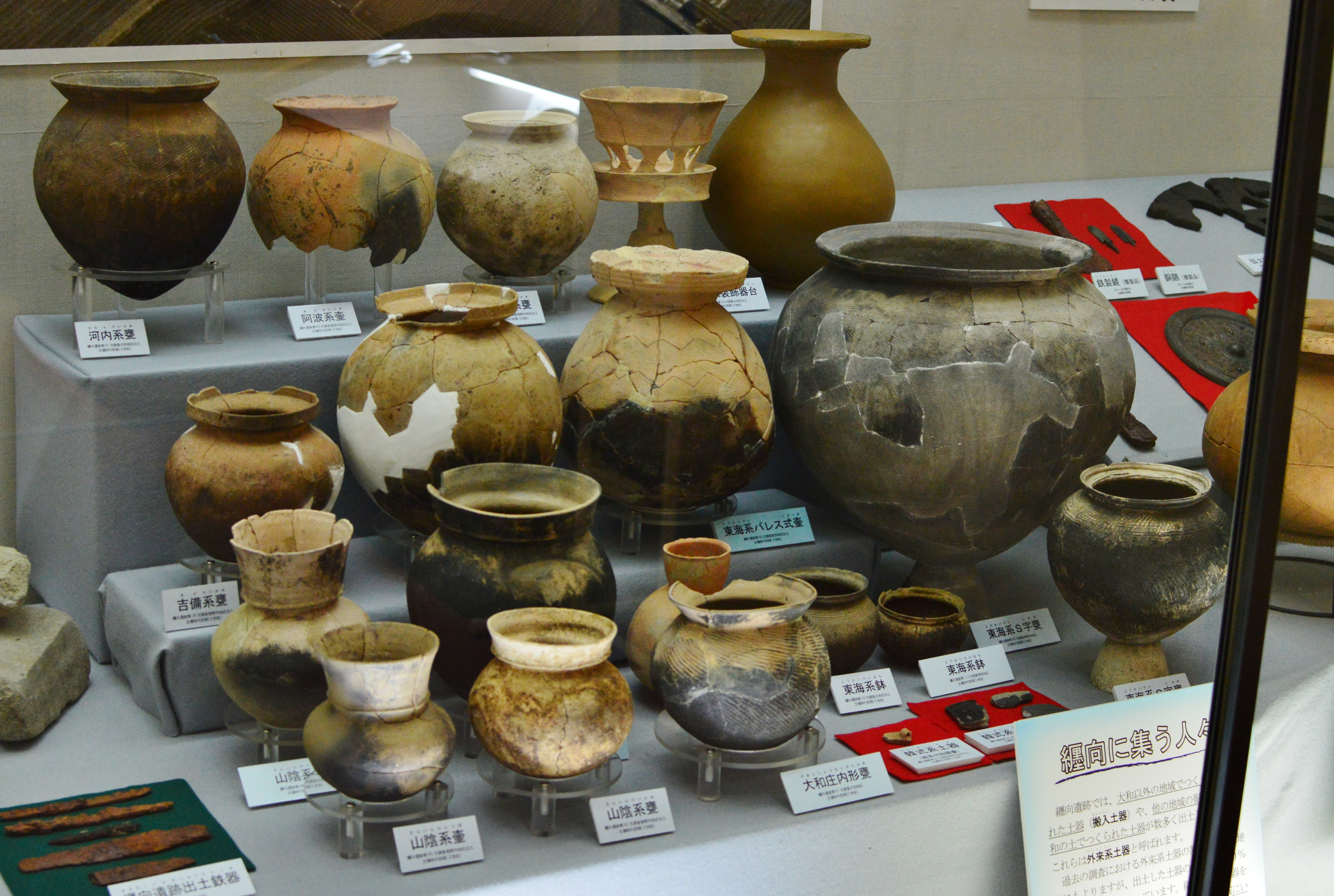
Group of excavated earthenware

=== The main tombs of the Makimuku site ===
- Makimuku Ishizuka Kofun
- Makimuku Katsuyama Kofun
- Makimuku Yazuka Kofun
- Higaida-ōtsuka Kofun
- Hokenoyama Kofun
- Hashihaka Kofun

=== A peculiar site ===
- Although the site is said to be a large settlement, the remains of an inhabited settlement have not been found. All that can be seen today are ritual buildings, earthen mounds, ritual implements such as arcane discs and chicken-shaped wooden products, and large and small ditches (canals) protected by cypress sheet piles for distribution. Many scholars believe that the site was not a residential area, but rather a place for frequent gatherings of people and goods, and for rituals to Mount Miwa around the Hashihaka Kofun.
- In the Tsuji/Torii-mae area, a 2 × 3 m long digout pillar building and a row of fences running east–west to the south of it have been found; in the Ota Minami Tobizuka area, the remains of a collapsed house have been found; and in the Makinochi Ietsura area, a small 1 × 1 m long house and a 2 × 2 m long building with full columns have been found. In addition, 17 dugout pillar buildings have been found in the Ota Meguri area, and pit dwelling remains have been found in the Higashida Kakinoki and Ota Tobizuka areas.
- According to Hironobu Ishino, this is "a large settlement site that suddenly appeared at the end of the 2nd century and suddenly disappeared in the middle of the 4th century".

=== Excavation Report ===
- Ishino Hironobu, Sekikawa Naokoh, "Garments," Sakurai City Board of Education, September 1976.
- Sekikawa, Naokoh and Matsunaga, Hiroaki, "Summary of Excavations at the Garoshi Site," The Archaeological Institute of Kashihara, 1984.
- Naokoh Sekikawa and Hiroaki Matsunaga, "An Overview of the Excavation of the Garoshi Archaeological Site," The Archaeological Institute of Kashihara, Nara Prefecture, 1985.
- "Report on the Excavation of the Makimuku Site", Sakurai Municipal Archaeological Center, Excavation Report 28, 2007.
- "Makimuku Ruins", Sakurai City Board of Education, Education Division, 1981.
- "Sakurai City Excavation Report by the National Treasury Subsidy in 2015", Sakurai Municipal Archaeological Heritage Excavation Report 46, 2017.

== Characteristics of the site ==
- The site dates from the late Yayoi period to the early Kofun period.
- It is one of the largest settlement sites of its time, covering a vast area.
- The Hashihaka Kofun, which has Tradition as the tomb of Himiko, is a huge 280-metre-long mound. The preceding mound, the Makimuku-type post-frontal-yen mound, with a mound length of around 90 m, is also the largest mound in the Japanese archipelago in the 3rd century, and is the first great royal tomb of the Yamato Kingship. It is thought that the two tombs were politically linked, as they were also built in other parts of Japan.
- Himiko, the queen of the Yamataikoku Kingdom, according to one theory.

Kazuo Higo introduces the view of Shinya Kasai in the Taisho period. According to it, Kasai assigned Himiko to Momosohime, and her brother Emperor Sujin to Emperor Sujin. The rationale for this is as follows.
1. Emperor Sujin's year of death in the Chinese zodiac was Boshin, close to the year of Himiko's death.
2. It is clear that Himiko was a kind of priestess from the legend of her marriage to the deity of Mt. Miwa, and from the story of Nichiya Hitosaku, Yaya Kamisaku.

She was the aunt of Emperor Sojin, but from the point of view of a Chinese writer, she could have been mistakenly wrong as his nephew and brother.

Although there are many skeptics of this theory, some archaeologists believe that it is not unnatural for the Hashihaka Tomb to be Himiko's tomb, as the oldest giant anterior-posterior mound is the Hashihaka Tomb (the view of Shiraishi Taichiro and others). On the other hand, the size of the posterior circle of the Hashihaka Kofun, which is about 160m in diameter, may not match the description of Himiko's tomb in the Wajinden. It is written in Wajinden that "Heimyako died in a large tomb, which is about a hundred paces away from the tomb", which means that the size of the tomb is about 30m in the case of the short ri used in Wajinden, which means that the Hashihaka Tomb is too big. Furthermore, the size of the burial mound was described in terms of diameter in the Wei Shi Wajin Den, so it is thought to be a round burial mound or similar. Therefore, there is a question mark over the use of the Hashihaka Tomb as the tomb of Himiko. (However, there is a theory that the front part of the tomb was additionally constructed in later times.)

- In 2013, more than 100 potholes were found in a building that is believed to have been constructed in the 3rd century. It is thought that the building was built and demolished many times.
- Although pottery was brought in throughout the 3rd century, about 15% of the total excavated earthenware is made up of pottery brought in from Suruga, Owari, Ise, Omi, Hokuriku, San'in, Kibi and other areas, but there is little pottery from northern Kyushu. The proportion of ritual-related remains is about 30%, but there are very few bronze mirrors and swords, which indicate exchange with the continent. This suggests that at that time there was a local royal power in this area which had little to do with Kitakyushu or the continent.
- There are no Han mirrors, later Han mirrors or swords found at this site to prove that Himiko Cao Wei and others interacted with the continent. In addition, no iron arrowheads were excavated. According to Sekikawa Naokoh, "According to the Book of Wei, Himiko frequently sent messengers to Wei, and from Wei also came messengers and soldiers, so there was active exchange with the peninsula and the continent. Therefore, the active exchange with the peninsula and Korea as shown in the Heian-period Japanese history has not been proven and the site is not the site of the Yamatai.

=== The Royal Capital of the Yamato Kingdom ===
Kaoru Terasawa, in his book "The Birth of the Yamato Kingdom: The Royal Capital, the Makimuku Site and its Kofun Tombs", lists six features and peculiarities of the Makimuku Site

1. It appeared suddenly at the beginning of the 3rd century. It is a very well planned settlement and large in size.
2. The site is the largest in the Japanese archipelago and had a municipal function. The site was the largest in the Japanese archipelago and had a municipal function.
3. There are few domestic utensils and civil engineering tools are conspicuous, and a huge canal was built and large-scale civil engineering works for city construction were carried out.
4. Water-conducting facilities and ritual facilities are royal rituals. Royalty-related buildings. Arcuate designs originating from the royal tombs of Kibi, special vessel bases and jars.
5. The Hashihaka Kofun, which was stylised on the edge of the habitation space, and the garnet-shaped posterior frontal burial mound that preceded it.
6. Ironware production. (No ironware has been found at the Garoshi site).

In addition, there is a pottery with "Oichi" written in ink from the early Heian period, and this site is considered to correspond to the "Ohoichi" township described in "Wamyō Ruijushō". Kiki", it is known that the city had a municipal function until later times, and furthermore, the Emperor Suinin and Emperor Keiko's Shiki-no-mizukaki-no-miya, Emperor Suinin, and Tamaki-no-Hishiro-no-Miya, folklore are described as having existed.

After saying this, Terasawa concluded, "There is no other huge settlement in the Japanese archipelago in the third century that has such a total of archaeological and philological features. Therefore, it is highly probable that the third-century site of Gengen was the city where the capital palace of the first kingship of the archipelago, called the Yamato Kingdom, was located".

Hironobu Ishino also argues that it was not a naturally occurring village but an artificially built city, based on the discovery of a large ditch and a ritual site with a seawall leading to the Yamato River, the unusually large number of pottery artifacts from outside the Kinki region, and the fact that at least one out of every five people at Gengen is estimated to have come from outside the Yamato region.

The following remarks also reinforce the view that the site is the birthplace of the Yamato Kingship or the royal capital of the Yamato Kingship.

- In the surrounding area, there are also palaces such as Nagase Asakura Palace of Emperor Yūryaku in the 5th century, and Shiki (Isogi) Shima Omiya (Kinshiku) Palace of Kinmei in the 6th century.
- The Man'yoshu also contains many poems about the place name.

=== Birthplace of the Zenpokoenfun ===
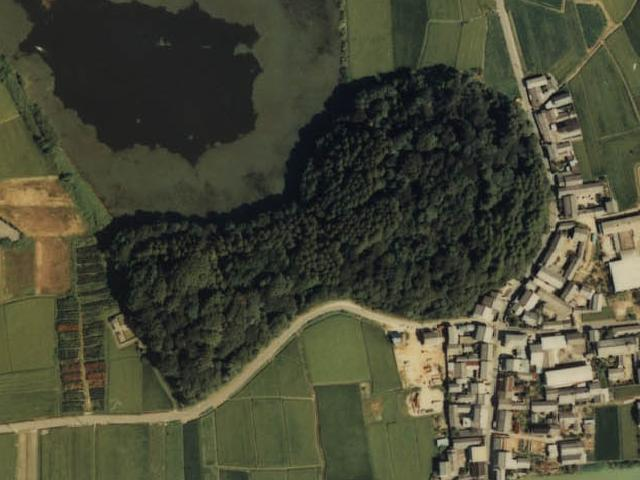
Hashihaka Kofun

The Hashihaka Kofun located at the site is generally considered to be the beginning of the stylized Zenpokoenfun system. Kaoru Terasawa considers the tombs belonging to the Makimukushizuka tumulus that preceded the Hashihaka Kofun, such as the Makimukushizuka tumulus, using the concept of "Makimukushizuka-type post-frontal-round tumulus", and places them in the emergence-period tumulus

Katsuyama Kofun is a Scallop Kofun with some elements indicating it was tranditional between that type and later Zenpokoenfun.

== See also ==
- Yamato Kingship
- Yamatai
- Yamatai Honshu Theory
- Hashihaka Kofun
