= Makimuku Ishizuka Kofun =

Ancient Japanese tomb

- ホケノ山古墳 (Japanese)
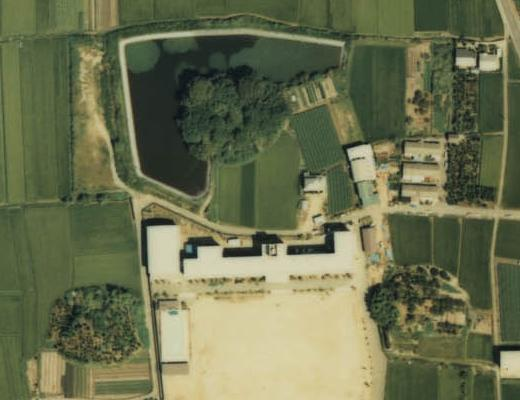
- The three tumuli are surrounded by the Makimuku Katsuyama tumulus (top), the Yatsuka tumulus (bottom left) and the Ishizuka tumulus (bottom right), and the Makimuku Elementary School is located between them

- Makimuku Ishizuka Kofun Makimuku Ishizuka Kofun (Japan)
- Interactive map of Makimuku Ishizuka Kofun
- 34°32′46.5″N 135°50′9.9″E
- Type: Kofun
- Periods: early Kofun period
- Location: Sakurai, Nara, Japan
- Region: Kansai region

History
- Built: c.2nd century

Site notes
- Public access: Yes (no facilities)

Makimuku Ishizuka Kofun (纒向石塚古墳) is an early Kofun period burial mound and one of the tumuli in the Makimuku Kofun Cluster and is located in the Ota neighborhood of the city of Sakurai Nara Prefecture, Japan. It is a kofun of Makimuku ruins. Collectively with the other tumuli in the Makimuku Kofun Cluster, it was designated a National Historic Site of Japan in 2006. It is dated to around 180CE, with the nearby Makimuku Katsuyama Kofun (纒向勝山古墳) being dated to around 200AD.

== Overview ==
The Makimuku Ishizuka Kofun is a hotategai-gata kofun (帆立貝形こふん)-style scallop-shaped tumulus 96 meters long, with a 64 meter diameter posterior circular mound, and a 34 meter wide rectangular anterior portion. The narrow part connecting the two portions is 15–16 meters wide. The moat is about 20 meters wide. The posterior mound is an irregular circle, 59 meters east-to-west and 45 meters north-to-south, and the front is curves open like a shamisen plectrum. No fukiishi roofing stones or clay haniwa were used. The top of the mound was leveled at the end of the Pacific War, and the remains of the foundations of an anti-aircraft gun emplacement remain in situ.'. At that time, no burial chamber was found, and no artifacts were excavated. However, it was the first kofun excavated from Makimuku ruins, and was where some of the earliest Haji pottery was found. In subsequent post-war excavations, late Yayoi pottery to early Kofun period pottery has been excavated from the surrounding moat. Other excavated items include arc-patterned disks (a ritual artifact often excavated in the San'yō region), vermilion-painted wooden products in the shape of a chicken, wooden hoes and shovels, mallets, water tanks, wooden building materials, and Haji ware pottery. Experts differ on whether this tumulus dates from the early third century to the middle 4th century. A hinoki cypress board recovered from the bottom of the moat was dated by dendrochronology to 177 AD; however, it was only a portion of a piece of wood which may have been felled up to two centuries after that date.

There are no historical records or traditions about the person for whom this tumulus was constructed. However, considering that the estimated construction date mentioned above is just before the outbreak of the Civil War of Wa, around 178-184 AD, as recorded in Chinese historical records, an unsupported theory exists that it is related to a male king who is said to have reigned for over 70 years before the war mentioned in the Book of the Later Han.

== Religious significance ==
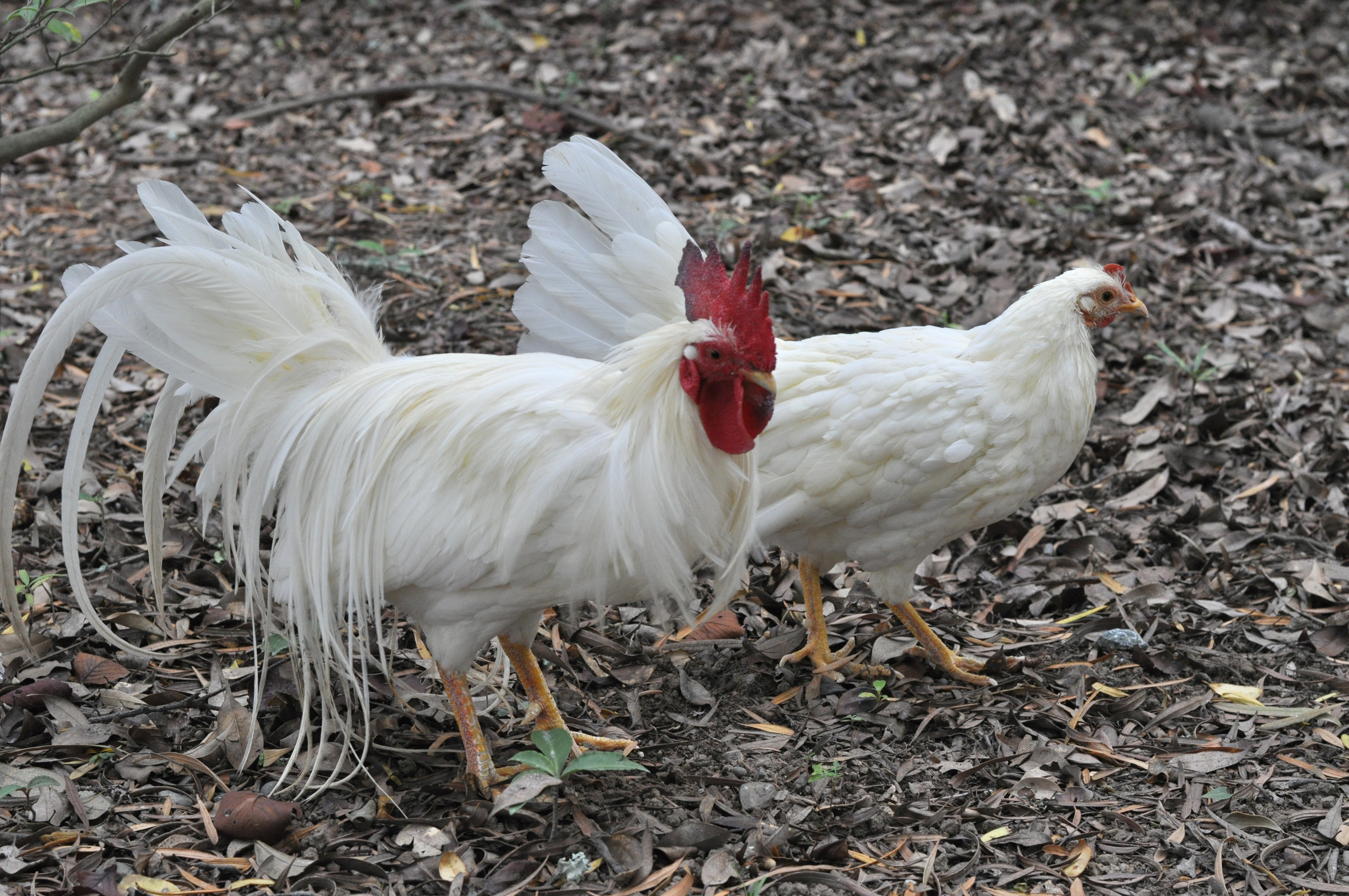
Chickens at Ise Grand Shrine. Parishioners believe they are messengers of Amaterasu.

Archaeological evidence indicates rituals were performed in the tomb. Wooden pillars 20 cm in diameter were erected within its moats. Wooden roosters painted in vermilion lacquer were discovered in the moat surrounding the mound's circular section. The bird carving is 39 centimeters long. Historians and archaeologists believe these roosters might have been part of ceremonies aimed at praying for the resurrection of the deceased. Similar wooden and clay figures resembling roosters have been found in other early Kofun period tombs. Roosters are the animal messengers of Amaterasu.

The birds may symbolize the soul's journey. These items were found in peat at the Ikegami-sone site in Izumi City, Osaka. The Yamato-takeru story mentions a white bird flying between tombs. This story relates to the found items. It shows ancient beliefs about life and the soul.

The tomb faces Mount Miwa, a sacred mountain. The Kojiki, says the god Ōmononushi wanted people to worship him on this mountain. There is a complex narrative about Emperor Sujin and the establishment of worship in the region. with some interpreting the god as being Yamato-no-Okunitama one of the two gods previously worshipped in the Imperial palace alongside Amaterasu. The tomb's direction shows that the Makimuku area's rulers and people respected Mount Miwa deeply. Buildings at the Makimuku site also face Mount Miwa on purpose. This shows their religious link to the mountain.

== See also ==
- List of Historic Sites of Japan (Nara)
