= Makimuku Kofun Cluster =

Group of kofun burial mounds in Japan

Makimuku Kofun cluster
- 纒向古墳群 (Japanese)
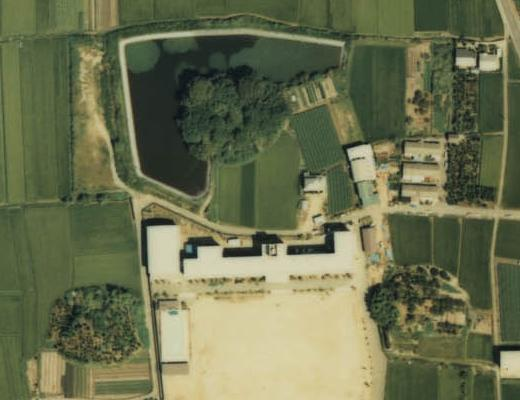
- Makimuku Katsuyama Kofun (top), Makimuku Yazuka Kofun (bottom left), Makimuku Ishizuka Kofun (bottom right), and the Makimuku Elementary School in between

- Makimuku Kofun cluster Makimuku Kofun Cluster (Japan)
- 34°32′48.1″N 135°50′09.8″E
- Type: kofun
- Periods: Kofun period
- Location: Sakurai, Nara, Japan
- Region: Kansai region

History
- Built: 3rd to 4th century AD

Site notes
- Public access: Yes (no public facilities)

Makimuku Kofun cluster (纒向古墳群, Makimuku Kofun gun) is group of kofun burial mounds located in the Ota, Higashida, and Hashinaka neighborhoods of the city of Sakurai, Nara in the Kansai region of Japan. It is part of the Ooyamato Kofun Cluster (Yamato-Yanagimoto Kofun Cluster Group), at the western foot of Mount Miwa. It is considered to be the birthplace of the zenpō-kōen-fun (前方後円墳)-style of tumuli. The cluster was designated a National Historic Site of Japan in 2006.

== Overview ==
Located in the southeastern part of the Nara Basin, this group of ancient tombs dates back to the early days of the Yamato government, and is located very close to the Hashihaka Kofun managed by the Imperial Household Agency. The cluster consists of five tumuli, all with a distinctive hotategai-gata kofun (帆立貝型古)-style unique to this site, so much so that they are also called Makimuku-style Kofun (纒向形古墳, Makimuku-gata gun). Considered the predecessors of the true zenpō-kōen-fun, these tumuli are characterized by:

- The front part is significantly smaller and lower than the rear circular mound.
- The ratio of the total length of the mound, the diameter of the rear circular mound, and the length of the front part is exactly 3:2:1 as a rule.
- The rear circular mound is oblate, inverted egg, or irregularly circular, not a perfect circle.
- The tombs with a moat have a narrow front part.

In terms of Haji ware pottery style, the construction period of these five tumuli is thought to be between the end of the Yayoi period to the beginning of the early Kofun period, or the latter half of the 3rd century to the 4th century. Agricultural and civil engineering tools, ritual implements, and building materials have been excavated from the moats surrounding the tumuli, and Hokenoyama Tomb has a burial facility with an unusual structure of stacked stones around a wooden coffin, in which grave goods such as a painted belt with a divine beast bronze mirror and iron weapons were buried. There are similar burial mounds from Kyushu to Kanto, but this group of tumuli is large in scale, suggesting that a political alliance had already been formed around the chief of the Yamato region. On the other hand, the wooden products excavated from the moats, the burial facility of Hokenoyama Kofun, and the grave goods such as bronze arrowheads, iron arrowheads, swords, and painted belt with a divine beast mirror are not seen in later standardized keyhole-shaped tumuli, and are characteristic of a burial mound from the end of the Yayoi period.

== Gallery ==
Makimuku Yazuka Kofun

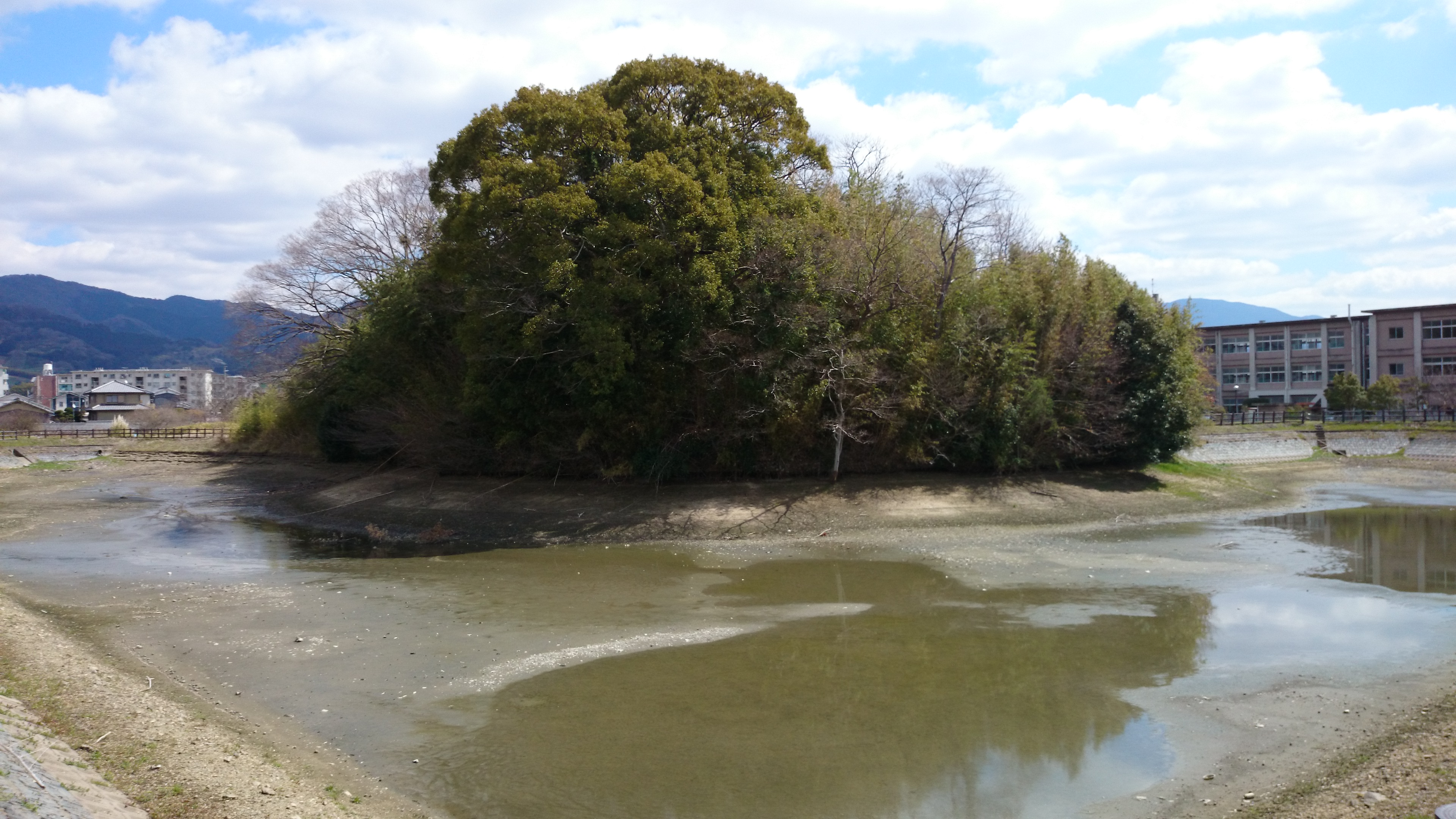
Makimuku Katsuyama Kofun

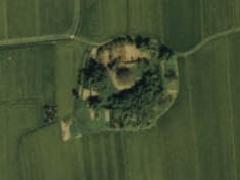
Higashida Otsuka Kofun

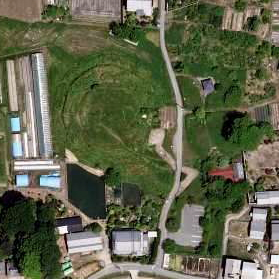
Hokenoyama Kofun

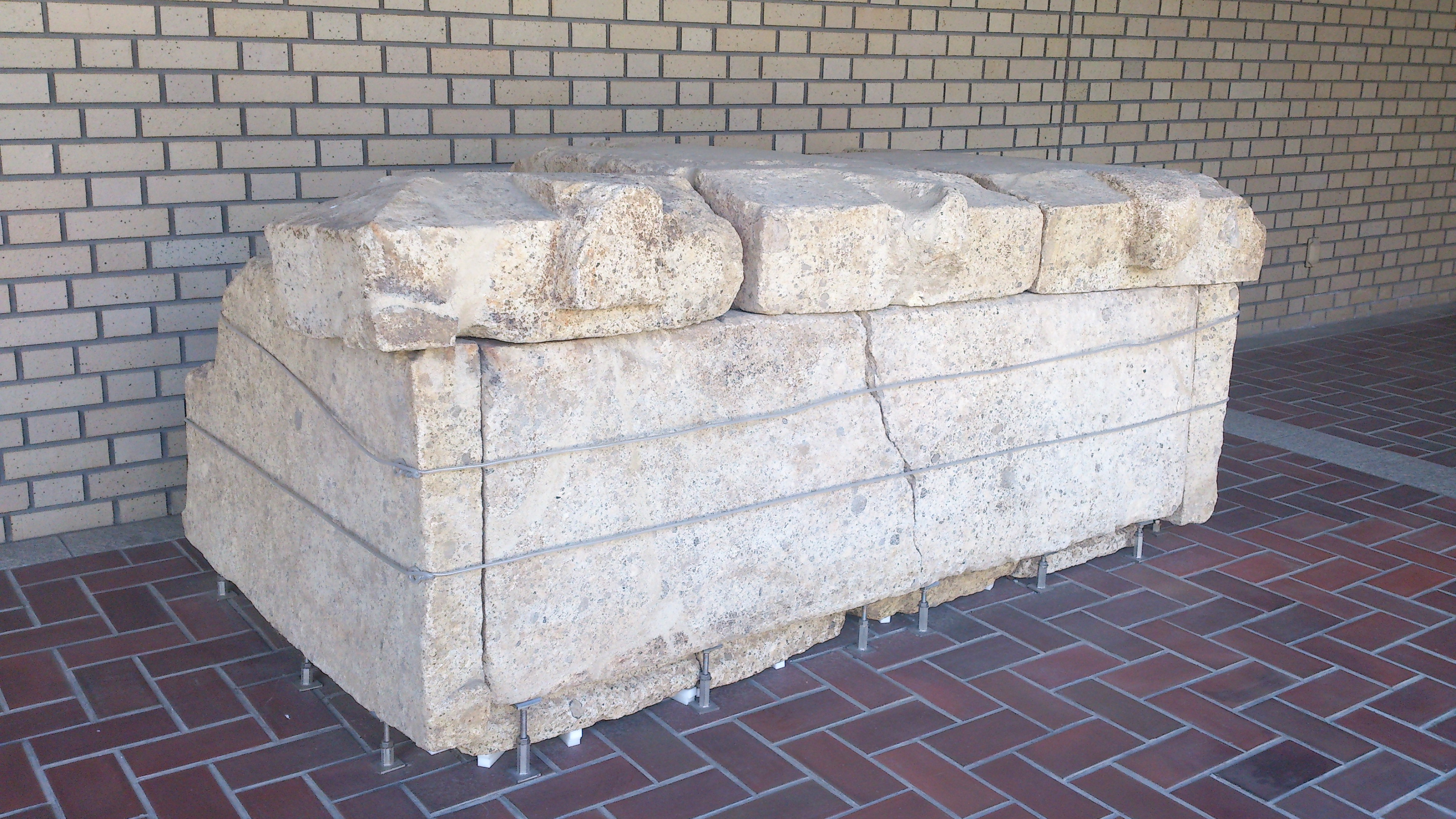
Sarcophagus from the Hokenoyama Kofun

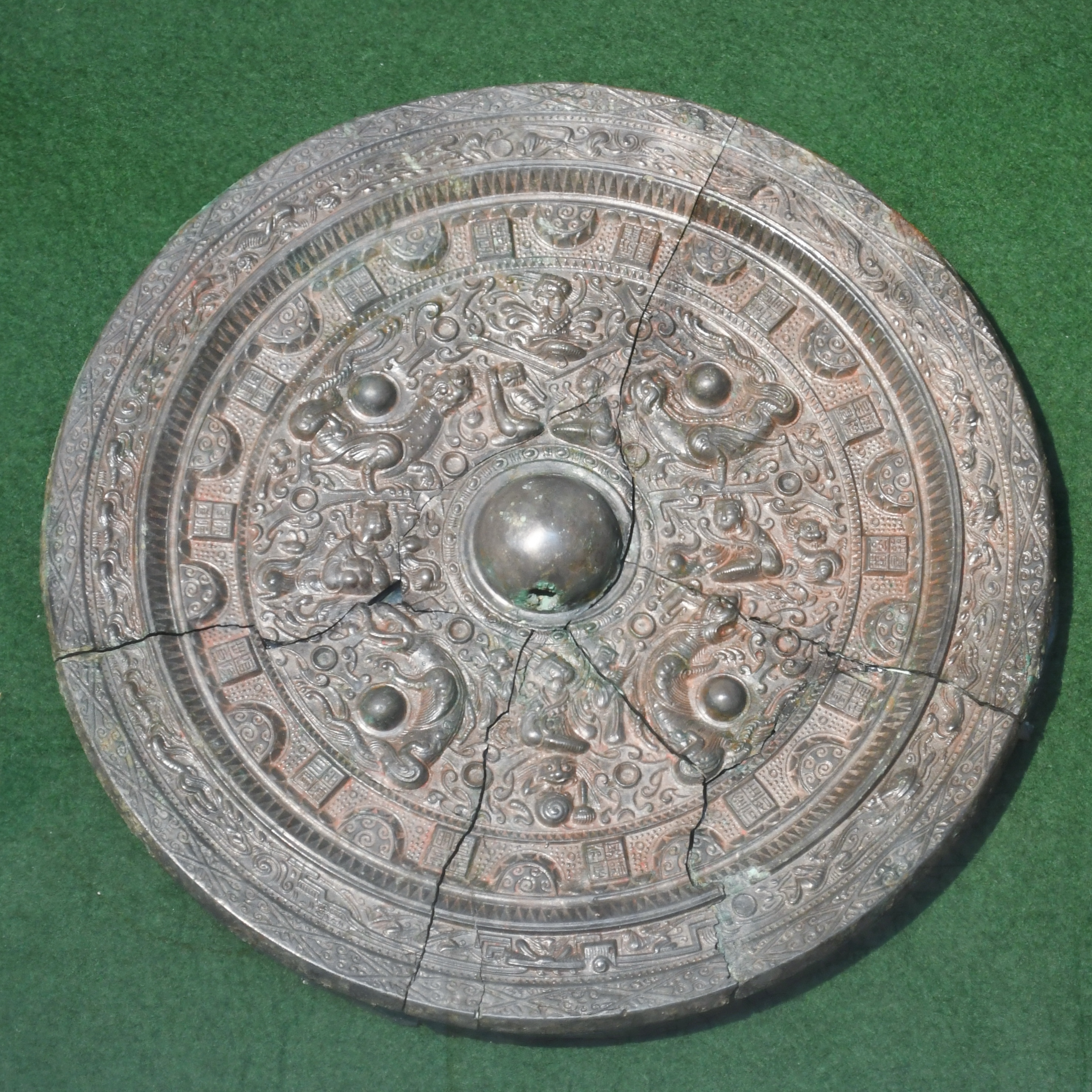
bronze mirror from the Hokenoyama Kofun

Mikuriyama Kofun group
Name	Location	Coordinates	Type	Size	Artifacts	Date
Makimuku Ishizuka Kofun (纒向石塚古墳)	Ota	34°32′46.5″N 135°50′9.9″E	Scallop	length = 96m	late 2nd to 3rd century	
Makimuku Yazuka Kofun (纒向矢塚古墳)	Higashida	34°32′56″N 135°50′1.8″E	Scallop	length = 96m	mid 3rd century	
Makimuku Katsuyama Kofun ([纒向勝山古墳)	Higashida	34°32′50.7″N 135°50′5.2″E	Scallop	length = 110m	3rd century	
Higashida Ōtsuka Kofun (東田大塚古墳)	Higashida	34°32′36.7″N 135°50′0.20″E	Scallop	length = 120m	early 3rd century	
Hokenoyama Kofun (ホケノ山古墳)	Hashinaka	34°32′23.5″N 135°50′41.6″E	Scallop	length = 80m	mid-3rd century	

== See also ==
- List of Historic Sites of Japan (Nara)
- Makimuku Site, late Yayoi period to early Kofun period settlement ruins associated with the Makimuku Kofun Cluster.
