= Hokenoyama Kofun =

Ancient Japanese tomb

- ホケノ山古墳 (Japanese)
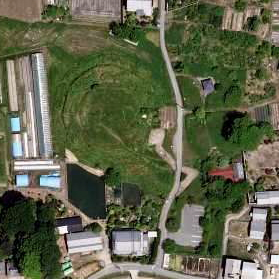
- Hokenoyama Kofun

- Hokenoyama Kofun Hokenoyama Kofun (Japan)
- Interactive map of Hokenoyama Kofun
- 34°32′24″N 135°50′42″E
- Type: Kofun
- Periods: early Kofun period
- Location: Sakurai, Nara, Japan
- Region: Kansai region

History
- Built: c.2nd century

Site notes
- Public access: Yes (no facilities)

Hokenoyama Kofun is an early Kofun period burial mound and one of the tumuli in the Makimuku Kofun Cluster in the Hashihaka neighborhood of the city of Sakurai Nara Prefecture, Japan. Collectively with the other tumuli in the Makimuku Kofun Cluster, it was designated a National Historic Site of Japan in 2006. A portion of the artifacts excavated from the tumulus are collectively designated a National Important Cultural Property. It is believed to have been constructed around 250 AD.

== Overview ==
The Hokenoyama Kofun is located to the east of the Hashihaka Kofun. It has a distinctive hotategai-gata kofun (帆立貝形こふん)-style scallop-shaped design. The tumulus measures approximately 80 meters in length, with a posterior circular diameter of 60 meters, built in three tiers, with a height of 8.5 meters. The anterior rectangular section is only 3.5 meters high and 20 meters long, and the tumulus is orientated to the southeast. The tumulus is surrounded a moat 10.5 to 17 meters wide (wider on the west side). Over time, certain details of its angular contours have become less distinct due to natural wear and erosion. The exterior has fukiishi roofing stones from the Makimuku river, but no trace of haniwa. A road cuts through its southeast extension as can be seen in the image to the right.

The burial facility in the center of the circular mound at the rear of the tumulus consists of a stone burial chamber with walls made of piled river stones and a wooden ceiling. The 1995 archaeological excavation found a stone sarcophagus enclosing wooden coffin and a stone paved floor. The stone sarcophagus is large, approximately 6.5 meters long and 2.6 meters wide, and contains a five-meter long, hollowed-out "split-bamboo" shaped wooden coffin made from Japanese cedar. The inside was once painted with vermillion. Decorated jar-shaped earthenware is arranged at the top of the coffin, but it had fallen into the coffin as the wood had decayed. Although it had been partially looted in the past, remaining grave goods included a complete picture-and-text-belted divine beast bronze mirror that was buried with the tomb, as well as 23 fragments of a deliberately broken picture-and-text-belted divine beast bronze mirror and an inner-circle floral pattern bronze mirror, as well as numerous bronze arrowheads, iron arrowheads, swords, tools, and other iron products. From these artifacts, it has been determined that the tumulus was built in the mid-3rd century. Grave goods included pottery from the local area but also from the Tōkai region and Seto Inland Sea. A bronze mirror from the tumulus is kept in Ōmiwa Shrine. The mid-third century dating of this tumulus corresponds to the postulated period of Queen Himiko and the Kingdom of Yamataikoku, as described in the Records of the Three Kingdoms. The Ōmiwa Shrine also asserts without any physical evidence that this tumulus is the grave of Toyosukiiri-hime, a daughter of Emperor Sujin, and chief priestess of the Ise Grand Shrine.

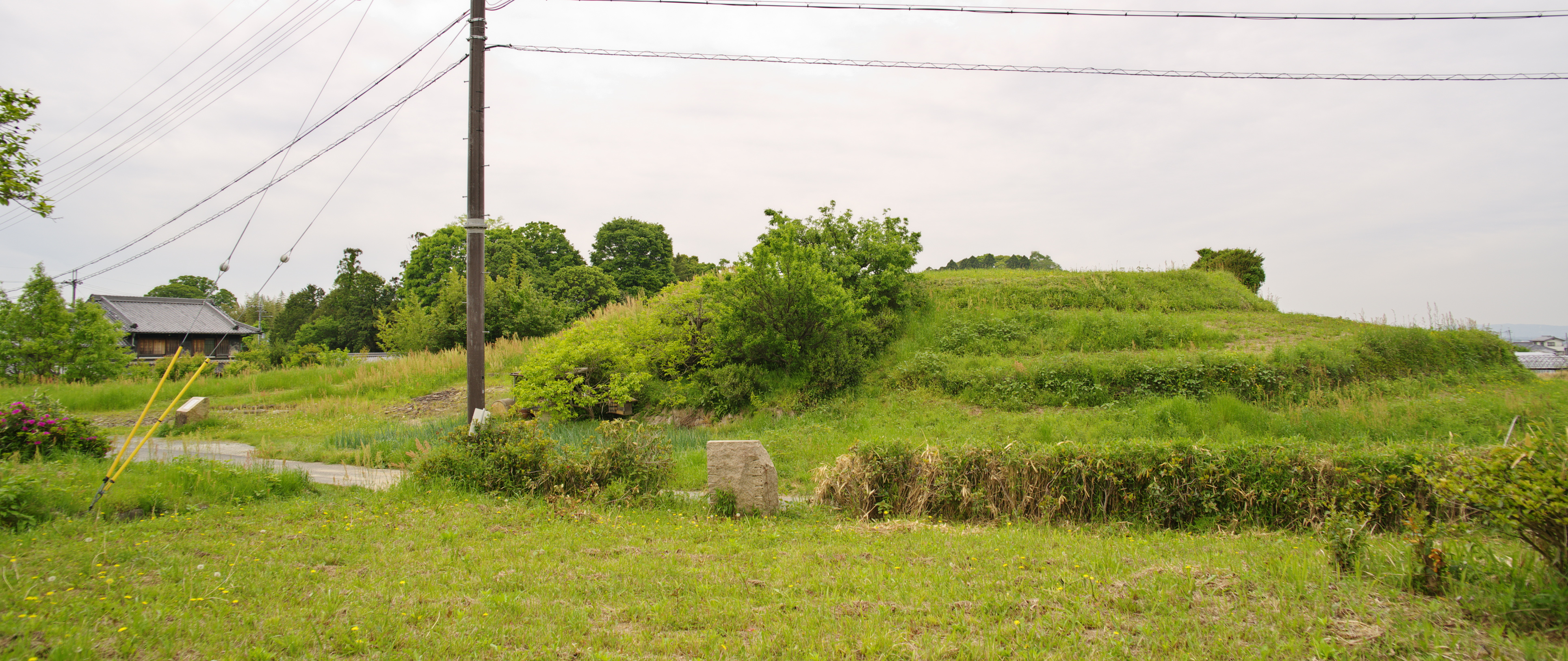
Side view of the tumulus

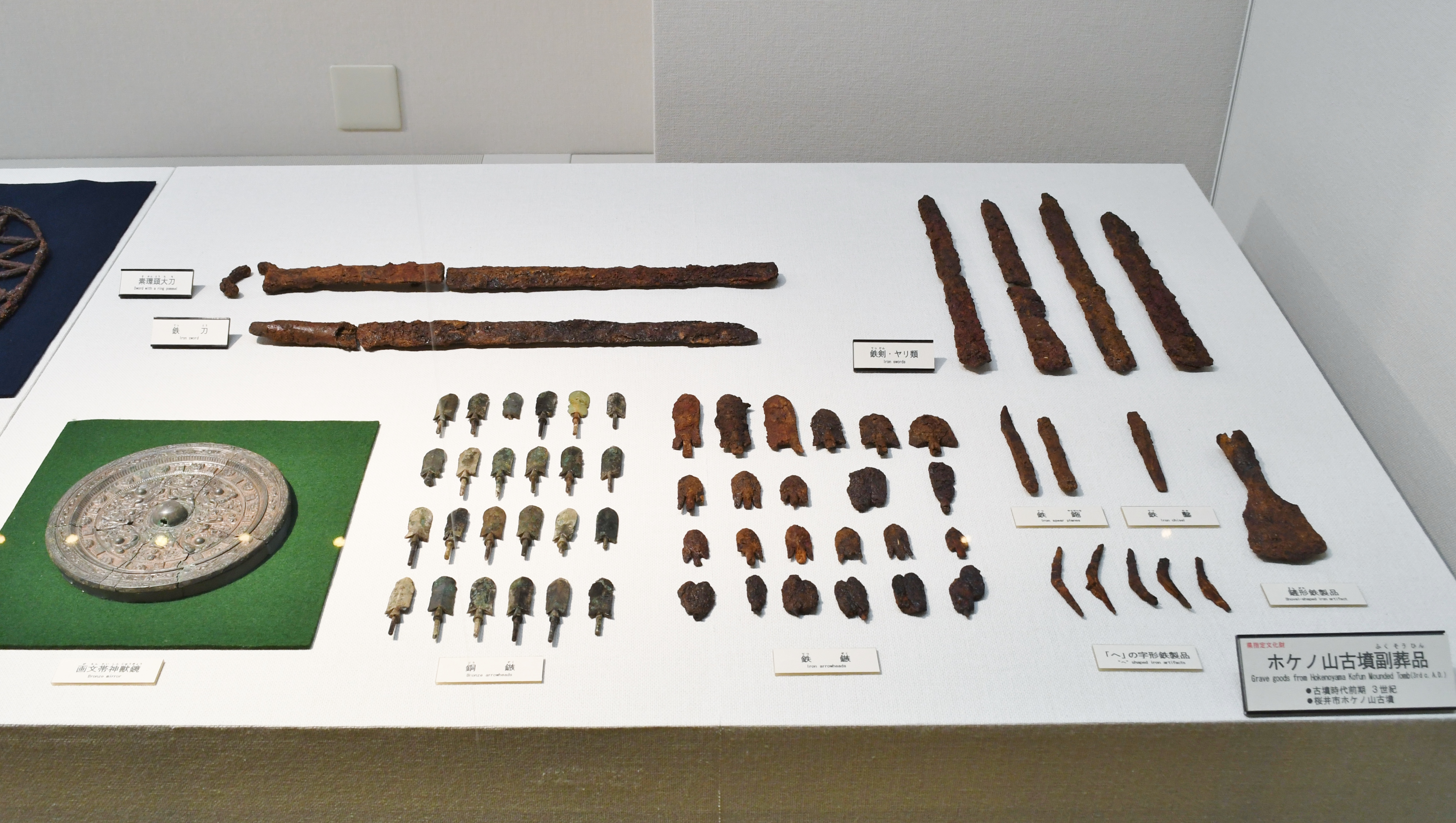
Excavated Items
Displayed at the Nara Prefectural Kashihara Archaeological Institute Museum.

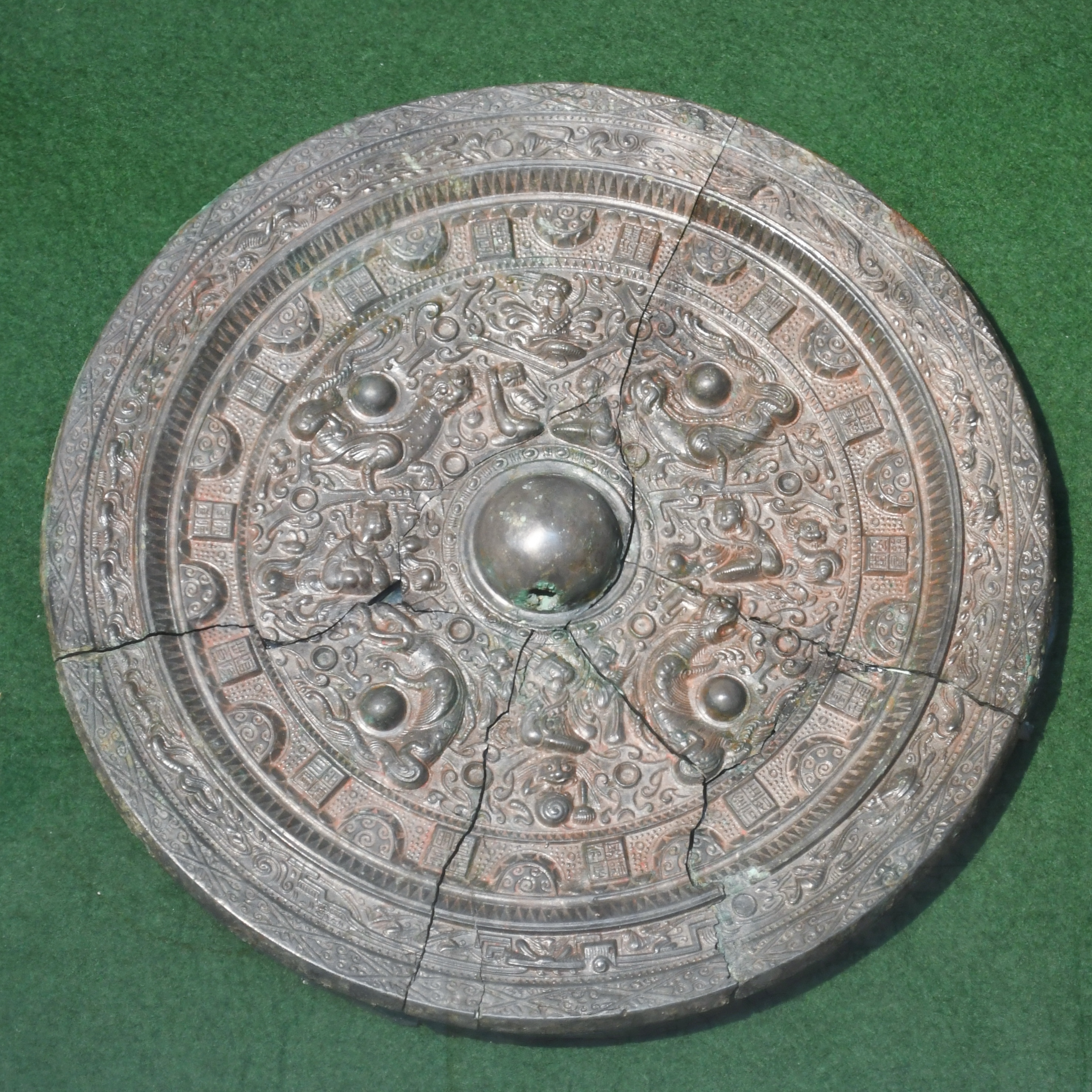
Excavated Bronze Mirror
Displayed at the Nara Prefectural Kashihara Archaeological Institute Museum.

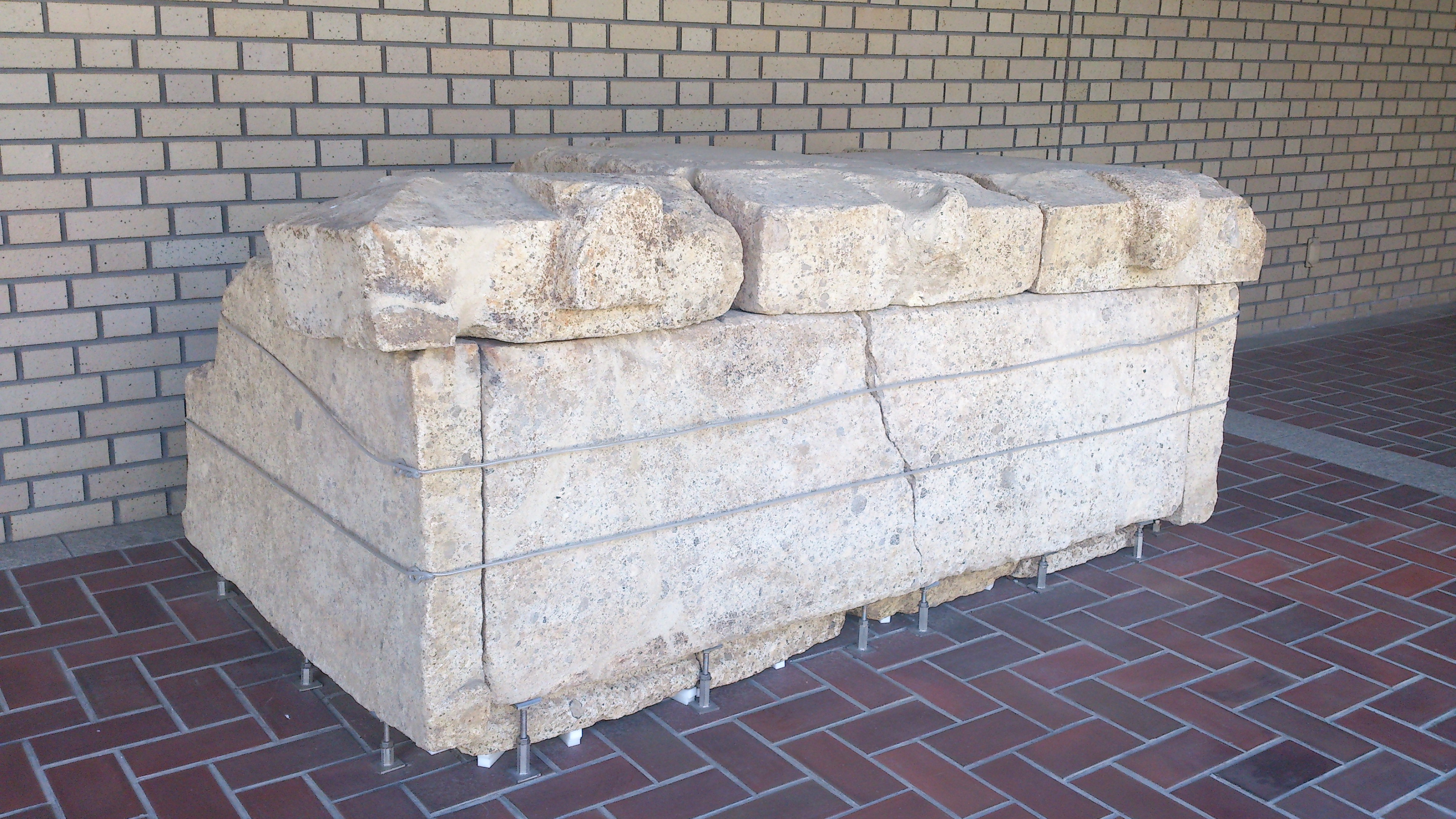
sarcophagus from the kofun

A second wooden coffin was found in the anterior rectangular portion, and a simple direct burial was found in the narrows connecting the two halves of the tumulus. In addition, there is second stone burial chamber on the west side of the circular tumulus, which was a subsequent burial from around the end of the 6th century, making use of the pre-existing burial mound.

== See also ==
- List of Historic Sites of Japan (Nara)
