= Higashida Ōtsuka Kofun =

Ancient Japanese tomb

- 東田大塚古墳 (Japanese)
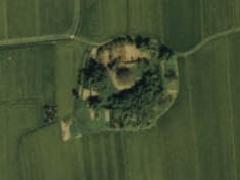
- Higashida Ōtsuka Kofun

- Higashida Ōtsuka Kofun Higashida Ōtsuka Kofun (Japan)
- Interactive map of Higashida Ōtsuka Kofun
- 34°32′36.7″N 135°50′0.2″E
- Type: Kofun
- Periods: early Kofun period
- Location: Sakurai, Nara, Japan
- Region: Kansai region

History
- Built: c.3rd century

Site notes
- Public access: Yes (no facilities)

Higashida Ōtsuka Kofun (東田大塚古墳) is an early Kofun period burial mound and one of the tumuli in the Makimuku Kofun Cluster in the Higashida Ōtsuka neighborhood of the city of Sakurai Nara Prefecture, Japan. Collectively with the other tumuli in the Makimuku Kofun Cluster, it was designated a National Historic Site of Japan in 2006.

== Overview ==
The Higashida Ōtsuka Kofun has a distinctive hotategai-gata kofun (帆立貝形こふん)-style scallop-shaped design, with a total length of approximately 120 meters. It is an example of a "Makimuku-type keyhole-shaped tomb" with a ratio of the circular rear section to the front section of 2:1. The posterior circular portion is approximately 68 meters in diameter, with a height of nine meters, and the anterior rectangular section has a length of 50 meters. Currently, the front part extending to the southwest has been largely removed. The tumulus is surrounded by a moat with width of 21 meters and depth of 1.3 meters. No traces of fukiishi roofings stones or haniwa have been found.

The interior of the tumulus has never been excavated; however, jar burial was found on the outer bank of the moat, which may predate the construction of the kofun, which is believed to date from the late 3rd century.

== See also ==
- List of Historic Sites of Japan (Nara)
