= Makimuku Yazuka Kofun =

Ancient Japanese tomb

- 纒向矢塚古墳 (Japanese)
- Makimuku Yazuka Kofun

- Makimuku Yazuka Kofun Makimuku Yazuka Kofun (Japan)
- Interactive map of Makimuku Yazuka Kofun
- 34°32′56″N 135°50′1.8″E
- Type: Kofun
- Periods: early Kofun period
- Location: Sakurai, Nara, Japan
- Region: Kansai region

History
- Built: c.3rd century

Site notes
- Public access: Yes (no facilities)

Makimuku Yazuka Kofun (纒向矢塚古墳) is an early Kofun period burial mound and one of the tumuli in the Makimuku Kofun Cluster in the Higashida neighborhood of the city of Sakurai Nara Prefecture, Japan. Collectively with the other tumuli in the Makimuku Kofun Cluster, it was designated a National Historic Site of Japan in 2006.

== Overview ==
The Makimuku Yazuka Kofun has a distinctive hotategai-gata kofun (帆立貝形こふん)-style scallop-shaped design, with a total length of approximately 60 meters. It is an example of a "Makimuku-type keyhole-shaped tomb" with a ratio of the circular rear section to the front section of 2:1. The posterior circular portion of oval, approximately 64 meters east–west, approximately 56 meters north–south, with a height of five meters, and anterior rectangular section had length of 32 meters, now truncated to 28 meters. The tumulus has a moat 17 to 23 meters in width, but only 0.6 meters deep and only surrounding the rear circular mound. It is orientated to the west. The interior of the tumulus has never been excavated, but since slabs of stone are exposed at the top of the mound, it is thought have a pit-type stone burial chamber and/or a box-type stone coffin. The excavated artifacts include haniwa clay figures, Sue ware pottery, and roof tiles, but none of these are associated with the remains. The tumulus is believed to date from the mid-third century.

== See also ==
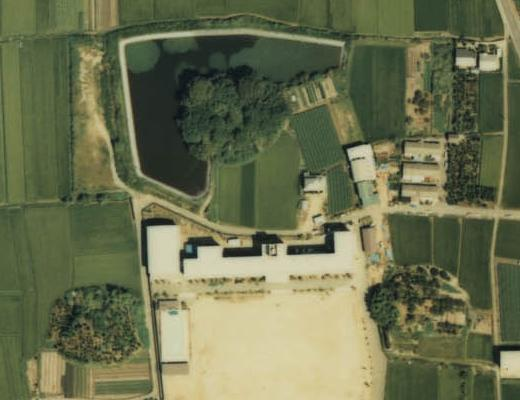
Makimuku Katsuyama Kofun (top), Makimuku Yazuka Kofun (bottom left), Makimuku Ishizuka Kofun (bottom right), and the Makimuku Elementary School in between

- List of Historic Sites of Japan (Nara)
