= Makimuku Katsuyama Kofun =

Ancient Japanese tomb

- 纒向勝山古墳 (Japanese)
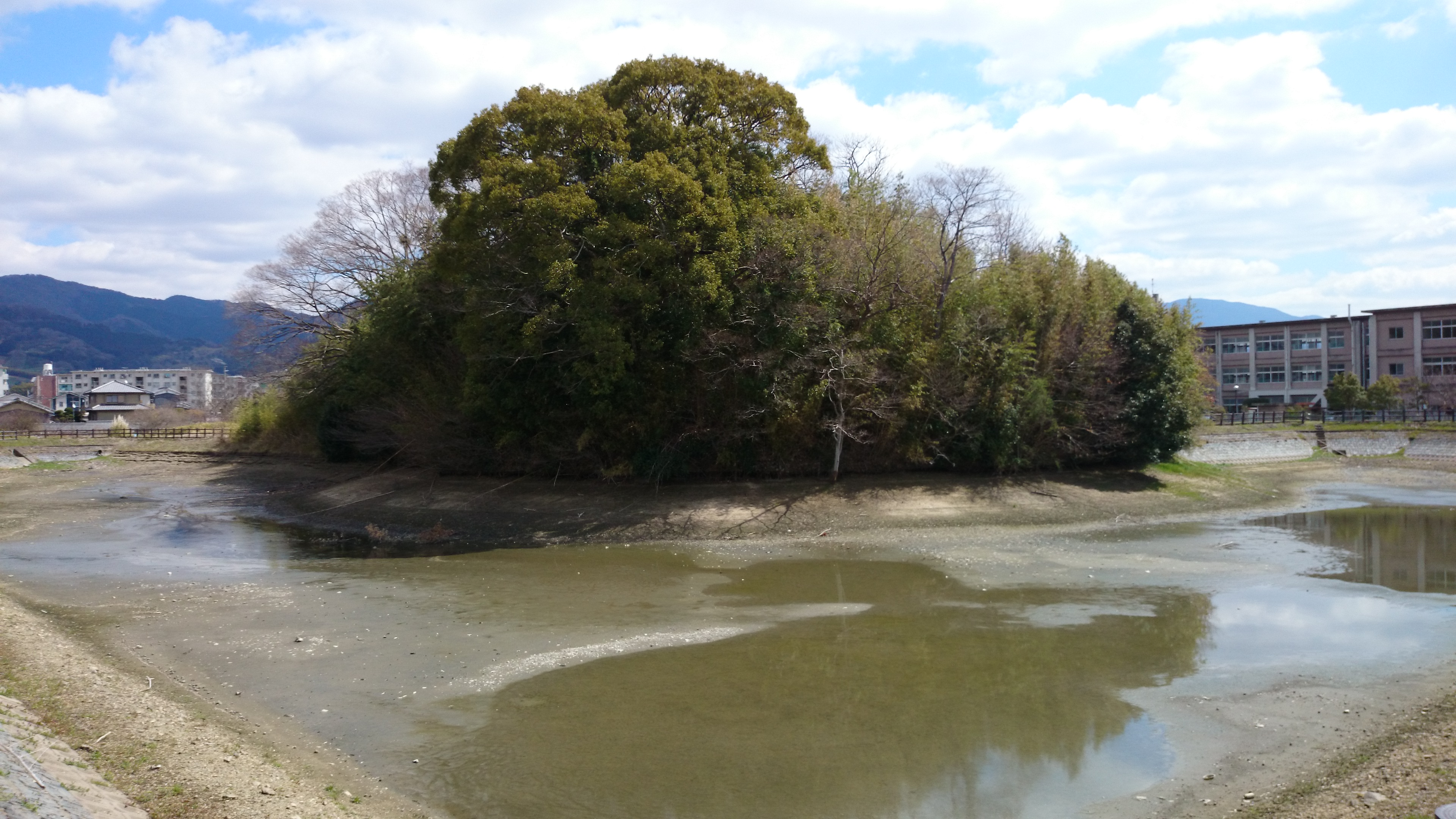
- Makimuku Katsuyama Kofun

- Makimuku Katsuyama Kofun Makimuku Katsuyama Kofun (Japan)
- Interactive map of Makimuku Katsuyama Kofun
- 34°32′56″N 135°50′1.8″E
- Type: Kofun
- Periods: early Kofun period
- Location: Sakurai, Nara, Japan
- Region: Kansai region

History
- Built: c.3rd century

Site notes
- Public access: Yes (no facilities)

Makimuku Katsuyama Kofun (纒向勝山古墳) is an early Kofun period burial mound and one of the tumuli in the Makimuku Kofun Cluster in the Higashida neighborhood of the city of Sakurai Nara Prefecture, Japan. Collectively with the other tumuli in the Makimuku Kofun Cluster, it was designated a National Historic Site of Japan in 2006.

== Overview ==
The Makimuku Katsuyama Kofun has a distinctive hotategai-gata kofun (帆立貝形こふん)-style scallop-shaped design, with a total length of approximately 115 meters. It is an example of a "Makimuku-type keyhole-shaped tomb" with a ratio of the circular rear section to the front section of 2:1. The posterior circular portion of oval, approximately 70 meters in diameter, with a height of seven meters, and anterior rectangular section had length of 46 meters, and width of 26 meters. It is surrounded by an inverted trapezoidal pond around it, which seems to be a trace of a horseshoe-shaped moat. The interior of the tumulus has never been excavated, but artifacts recovered from the moat include a large amount of earthenware shards and wooden objects. The earthenware is of various types, including jars, bowls, and high cups used in daily life, and originated from Kibi, San'in region, Kawachi, Ōmi, Tōkai region, and Hokuriku regions. The wooden objects included one wooden hoe that is thought to have been used in civil engineering work, but the rest are red-painted sword handles and sheaths, a fan that is thought to have been used in ceremonies, a fire mortar, a tub-like container, and a boat-shaped vessel, and other items that are thought to be related to festivals and ceremonies rather than everyday tools. In 2001, hinoki cypress planks found in the soil at the narrow end of the moat were determined to date to 210AD by dendrochronology Nara National Research Institute for Cultural Properties' Buried Cultural Properties Center; however, this is the date at the time of felling, and it is unclear whether it is related to construction of the tumulus or the disposal of older material. Prior to tree-ring dating, the date was determined using pottery chronology based on the earthenware shards found in the moat, which date to around 300 AD.

== See also ==
- List of Historic Sites of Japan (Nara)
