= Hashihaka Kofun =

Megalithic tomb in Japan

Coordinates: 34°32′21.16″N 135°50′27.96″E

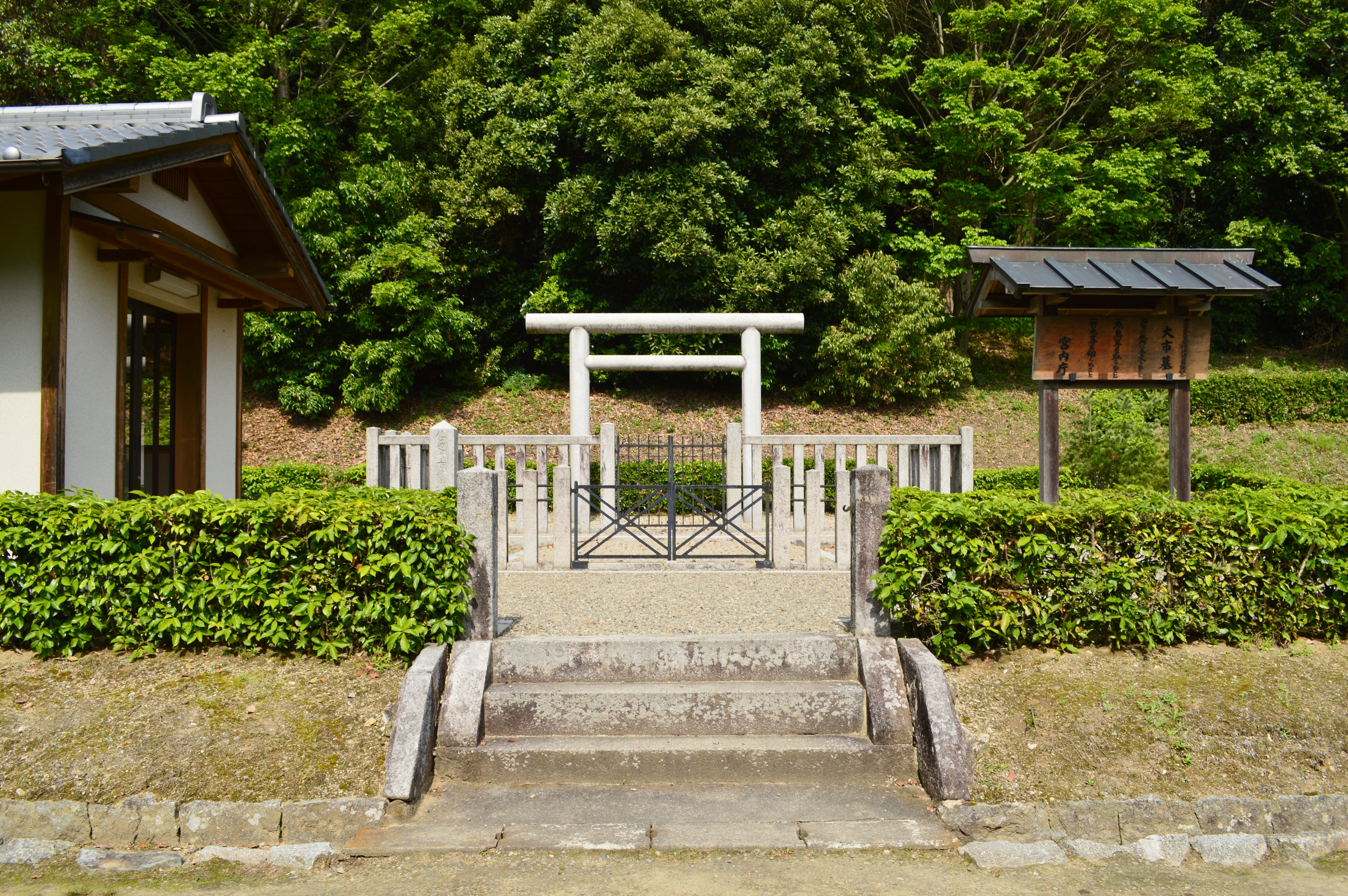
Princess Yamato Totohi Momoso Oichi Cemetery

The Hashihaka kofun (箸墓古墳) is a megalithic tomb (kofun) located in Sakurai, Nara Prefecture, Japan. The Hashihaka kofun is considered to be the first large keyhole-shaped kofun constructed in Japan and is associated with the emergence of the Yamato Kingship.

The Imperial Household Agency designates the Hashihaka kofun as the tomb of Princess Yamato Totohi Momoso, the daughter of the legendary Emperor Kōrei. Researchers in 2013 conducted the first-ever on-site survey of the Hashihaka kofun after being granted access by the Imperial Household Agency. The actual burial site is unknown, but the Imperial Household Agency has designated it as the tomb of Oichi no Haka, the seventh Kōrei princess, Princess Yamato Totohi Momoso. Also, since the research of Shinya Kasai, there is a theory that it may be the tomb of Himiko, the queen of Yamatai (Yamataikoku). The moat around the site has been designated as a historic site by the government, Part of the pond has been selected as one of the 100 best reservoirs as "Chopenaka Great Pond.

The name Hashihaka translates as "chopstick grave" and refers to a mythical love affair between Princess Yamato Totohi Momoso and the kami of sacred Mount Miwa, which ended with the princess stabbing herself to death with a chopstick.

== Overview ==
It is the main tumulus of the Alluvial fan zone at the northwestern foot of Miwa in the southeastern Nara Basin, and is located in the Chopashinaka district of the Garimuku site. It is located in the city. It is considered to be one of the oldest burial mounds of the emergence period.

The date of construction was determined by archaeological dating of earthenware (Doji pottery) excavated from the surrounding dugouts and by radiocarbon dating. According to Yamataikoku, there is a theory that places the date in the middle to late 3rd century, close to the year of death of Himiko (not far from 248) in the Yamataikoku. On the other hand, some date it to the mid-4th century or later, because recent carbon-14 dating methods have shown that the date is estimated to be 50–100 years older than the actual date, and because the size and style of the tomb is different from that described in the Wajinden (Treatise on the Wa People).

Currently, the Imperial Household Agency manages the tomb as a mausoleum, and researchers and the public are not allowed to enter the tumulus freely. Wajaku-no-Tsukihime-no-Mikoto is the sister of Emperor Kōgen, the grandfather of Emperor Sujin in Nihon Shoki (The Chronicles of Japan). Oichi is the name of the place where the tomb is located. In the Kojiki (Records of Ancient Matters or An Account of Ancient Matters), she is named Yamato Tomomosobime.

In the world of archaeology, the theory that "Queen Himiko = Wajaku-no-Hyakusohime-no-mikoto" was proposed by Shinya Kasai, who had advocated the theory of the Yamatai Internal Theory since the Taishō period, and later developed into the theory that "the tomb of Chopstick Tomb = Himiko's tomb", which was pioneering research leading to the discussions of today.

== Etymology ==
The origin of the name is based on a legend that a chopstick pierced the pubic region of Princess Hyakuso, causing her to die. In the Nihon Shoki, Soshin, September 10, there is a story as follows. It is generally referred to as the legend of Mount Miwa.

Yamato-totohi-momoso-hime-no-Mikoto became the wife of Ōmono-nushi-no-Kami. However, the deity never appeared during the day, coming only at night.

Yamato-toto-hime spoke to her husband, saying:

“My lord, you are never seen by day, but come only at night. Thus I am unable to behold clearly your noble countenance. I humbly ask that you remain a while. Tomorrow morning, I would look upon your beautiful and majestic form.”

The great deity replied:

“Your reasoning is most sound. Tomorrow morning I shall enter and abide within your comb box. I ask only that you not be startled at my form.”

Yamato-toto-hime secretly harbored suspicion in her heart, yet she waited until morning. When she opened the comb box, there was indeed a most beautiful little serpent inside. Its length and thickness were about that of a garment cord.

Startled, she cried out.

Ashamed, the great deity transformed into human form and said to his wife:

“You could not restrain yourself and have shamed me. Now I shall return the shame to you.”

Thereupon he ascended into the great sky and departed to Mount Mimoro.

Yamato-toto-hime looked up after him, and in remorse collapsed to the ground.

It is said that she pierced her private parts with a chopstick and died.

She was buried at Ōichi. Therefore, people of that time called her tomb Hashihaka — “Chopstick Tomb.”

The Nihon Shoki also describes the construction as follows.

The tomb was built by people during the day, and by the gods at night.

By day, stones from Mount Ōsaka were carried and used in its construction. From the mountain all the way to the tomb, people stood in lines, passing the stones from hand to hand as they transported them.

The people of that time sang:

On Ōsaka, the stone-clusters piled one upon another— if we pass them hand to hand, might we not be able to pass them all across?

There is also a theory by Hiroshi Tsuchihashi that the tombs of the Haji clan, a group that created ancient burial mounds, became Hashihaka Kofuns from the tombs of the Haji clan, or Haji tombs, because of the large gap between the introduction of chopsticks to Japan (7th century) and myths about them.

== Tomb shape and size ==
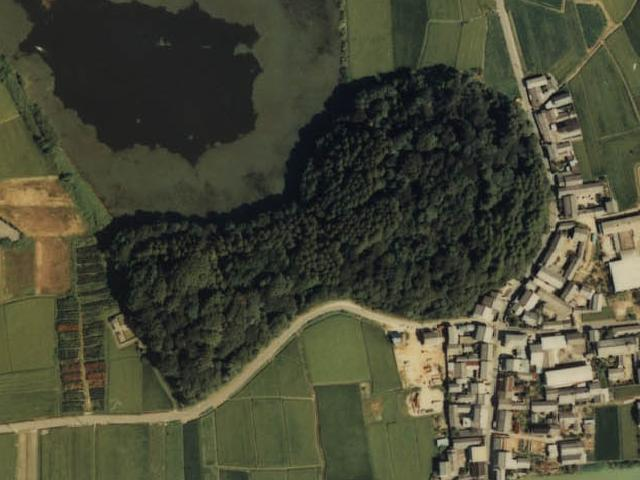
Based on aerial photographs from the Geospatial Information Authority of Japan's Map and Aerial Photograph Browsing Service, Ministry of Land, Infrastructure, Transport and Tourism.

In 1968, Yoshiro Kondo pointed out that the front part of an old stage front-recessed circular mound opens wide from the middle, and the Hashihaka Kofun, which has this mound shape, is now considered to be an old burial mound. The contour lines on the survey map indicate that the frontal part was wider than it is now. Other burial mounds with a repellent-shaped frontal opening include the Yakuyama No. 1 burial mound in the city of Tatsuno, Hyogo Prefecture, the Gongenyama No. 51 burial mound in the same prefecture, the Tsubaki-Otsukayama burial mound in Kizugawa, Kyoto Prefecture, and the Urama Chausuyama burial mound in Okayama, Okayama Prefecture. The Urama Chausuyama burial mound is said to be one-half the size of the Hashihaka Kofun burial mound, both in length and width, but with a difference in the shape of the apex of the frontal portion: a horizontal rectangle and a trapezoidal shape.

The current size of the mound is approximately 278 m (912 ft) long, with the rear portion measuring approximately 150 m (490 ft) in diameter and 30 m (98 ft) high, and the front portion measuring approximately 130 m (430 ft) wide and 16 m (52 ft) high. The volume is approximately 370,000 m^{3} (13,000,000 cu ft). Based on the results of a survey of the surrounding area, it is possible that it was originally larger.

Some researchers (e.g., Yoshiro Kondo) have pointed out that the posterior portion was built in four stages, with a small hill (about 44–46 m (144–151 ft) in diameter and 4 m (13 ft) high) placed on top of the four-stage construction, which is thought to have contained a special vessel platform. The front part is said to have four steps in front, although the side steps are not clear. Incidentally, five-tiered construction (four-tiered construction with a small circular hill on the rear part) is only found in the Hashihaka Kofun mound, while four-tiered construction (three-tiered construction with a small circular hill on the rear part) is found in the Nishidonotsuka tomb (Yamato tumulus group), Andonyama tumulus (Yanagimoto tumulus group), Shibuyamukiyama tomb (Yanagimoto tumulus group), Sakurai Chausuyama tomb (Torimiyama tumulus group), Mesuriyama tumulus (Torimiyama tumulus group), and Tsukiyama. All other tombs in the emperor's mausoleum class are considered to have been built in a three-tiered construction (both the rear circle and the front part are built in a three-tiered construction). This may indicate the rating of the person buried in the tomb.

The Museum, Archaeological Institute of Kashihara, Nara Prefecture and the Sakurai City Board of Education have conducted archaeological excavation The discovery of a 10 m (33 ft) wide shelter at the foot of the mound and a part of an outer bank more than 15 m (49 ft) wide on the outer side of the shelter. In the moat area on the southeast side of the rear circle, a causeway with fukiishi (roofing stones) piled up on both sides was found.

Archaeological excavation conducted from 1994 to 1995 confirmed the existence of a large depression, called the "outer moat-like structure," about 2 m (6 ft 7 in) deep and 50 m (160 ft) wide, on the outer side of the outer moat, surrounding the mound, moat, and outer moat. It is estimated that the site is located in the same area. This is presumed to be a depression topography caused by earth removal from the mound from which the soil used to build the mound was collected.

== Surface facilities and artifacts ==
A fukiishi made of Kawahara stone has been identified on the northern slope of the mound at the tip of the anterior part. Although Haniwa rows did not yet exist at this time, the Miyayama-type special vessel base and special jar by the Imperial Household Agency staff and the Miyayama-type special vessel base and special jar, and the Miyazuki-type cylindrical Haniwa (the oldest Haniwa) by (Note: Shiraishi and others, were found in Kibi (present Okayama Prefecture) It is believed to have come from the eastern part of Hiroshima Prefecture.) and other items have been collected, and there is no doubt that these were placed on the mound. In addition, while special vessels and jars, which were probably brought from the Okayama area, were found only on the posterior part of the mound, jar-shaped Doji pottery with a double rim and a hole in the bottom were collected on the anterior part, suggesting that the placement position of the vessels may have been differentiated according to the type of vessel. Based on the excavation of a special vessel stand and a special jar, it is believed that the mound was constructed in the early Kofun period.

The burial facility is unknown, but a basalt slab was found at the foot of the mound, suggesting that a pit-type stone chamber may have been constructed, and if this burial mound is Himiko's tomb, it contradicts the statement in Wajinden that "there is a sarcophagus, but no burial chamber". The stone is known to be from Shibayama in Kashiwara, Osaka Prefecture. Therefore, it is not the stone from Mount Osaka (Mount Nijō) mentioned in the Soshiniki.

== Construction period ==
Based on the shape of the mound and the contents of excavated artifacts, Taichiro Shiraishi and others have pointed out that it is the oldest class of posterior-frontal round mounds. Prior to the renovation of the levee on the west side of Chashinaka Pond, which is outside the designated area of the tomb, the Archaeological Institute of Kashihara, Nara Prefecture, conducted a preliminary survey and unearthed a large amount of Furu-zero-shiki earthenware from the bottom of the moat around the site. The Institute of Archaeological Research, Archaeological Institute of Kashihara, Nara Prefecture, estimated the actual age of these vessels to be 280–300 years (±10–20 years) based on carbon-14 dating.

However, the earthenware was not found in the tomb itself, and even if the carbonized material on the earthenware found at the bottom of the moat outside the designated mausoleum area is dated to the late third century, it does not represent the date of construction of the tomb, since there are remains from the Jōmon to Kofun periods at the site where this tomb was excavated, and even if it were the late 3rd century, it would be later than Himiko's death date.

=== Horse harness excavated from a ditch ===
Although the Wajinden describes the absence of oxen and horses, harnesses (abumi or wooden stirrups) have been excavated from the Zhou shelter.

During the 109th excavation of the Garui Site conducted by the Sakurai City Board of Education in 2000, a wooden wheel stirrup (harness) was found in the upper layer of the overlying soil (plant layer) inside the moat. The Nunome I earthenware excavated at the same time dates it to the early 4th century, which may have contributed to the influx of equestrian culture into the Japanese archipelago and to the East Asia, the understanding of the spread of equestrian culture in the region is now older and more revised than before. The excavation is not directly related to the chronology of the construction of the tomb itself, since it was excavated from the soil layer deposited after the moat had ceased to function and had begun to be buried.

The oldest stirrups that can be identified are only on one side of the Terracotta Warriors excavated from burial mounds in Sianbei and Eastern Jin in 302 and 322. Thus, the stirrup was invented around 290–300. The Chinese character for stirrup, "金編に登", derives from the fact that early stirrups were made of metal and used only as a foothold for horse riding. Wooden stirrups appeared after iron stirrups. The oldest known wooden stirrup is said to be a wooden-core, iron-plated stirrup from Cheonan Doi-dong in the early Baekje period (early 4th century) on the Korean peninsula. Onoyama Setsu, in his book Early Horse Equipment Discovered in Japan, classifies wooden-core, iron-plated stirrups into two types: old-style and new-style. According to this classification, the stirrup excavated from the moat around the tomb of Hashihaka Kofun cannot be confirmed because the lower part is missing, but judging from the remaining parts, the stirrup is considered to be of the new style.

- The handle is elongated
- The head of the handle is angular

The first half of the 4th century was shortly after the invention of the stirrup in China, and small iron stirrups can be found in Terracotta Armies from this period, but they functioned only as footrests for horse riding. The oldest wooden stirrups excavated on the Korean peninsula, dating from the Baekje period (first half of the 4th century), show dramatic improvements, such as the addition of iron plates to the wooden form, making them suitable for horse riding. Wooden stirrups are not found in mural tombs around Goguryeo, where they are thought to have been developed, until the 5th century or later. It is doubtful that the stirrups were introduced to the Korean peninsula in the first half of the 4th century, and since Baekje did not become a centralized state until the mid-4th century, it is more likely that the wooden stirrups were introduced in the mid-4th century or later. Furthermore, considering the time when these stirrups were introduced to Japan, it is preferable to date the wooden abumi from the Chopedombs burial mound to the late 4th or 5th century at the earliest, and the fact that they are later in date also supports this.

=== Opinions on age ===
The date of construction varies slightly depending on the chronology of the researcher. Kazuo Hirose places the date in the mid to late 3rd century. Taichiro Shiraishi places the date in the mid to late 3rd century, and says, "The mid-third century is the time of Himiko's successor, Taiyo, although she is dead. He also argues that "the mid-third century is after the mid-third century. Kaoru Terasawa places the date around 260–280 AD, and Hironobu Ishino places it in the fourth quarter of the late 3rd century, from 280 to 290 AD.

Although introduced as the oldest front-rear circular mound in Japan, there are many other front-rear circular mounds, including the Hokenoyama tumulus, the Garasu Katsuyama tumulus, the Garasu Yatsuka tumulus, the Kammon tumulus group (Kammon No. 5 and Kammon No. 4), and the Tsujihata tumulus. Unlike the shape of these mounds, which are known as the "garashiko-type front-recessed circular mounds," the Hashihaka Kofun Tumulus is a typical front-recessed circular mound with an enlarged square mound, and is generally considered to have been constructed from the late 3rd century to the early 4th century.

== Significance ==
The total length of the burial mound is about 280 m (920 ft), the height of the rear circle is about 30 m (98 ft), and the scale is such that you can think of it as a naturally formed small mountain. It is clearly different from the previous burial mounds, such as the fact that the excavated relics have Kibi-type pottery, which is the ancestral form of Haniwa. In addition, it is thought that the scale and Haniwa became a model of the tumulus after that, and many researchers evaluate the construction of this tumulus as the beginning of the Kofun period.

== Other ==
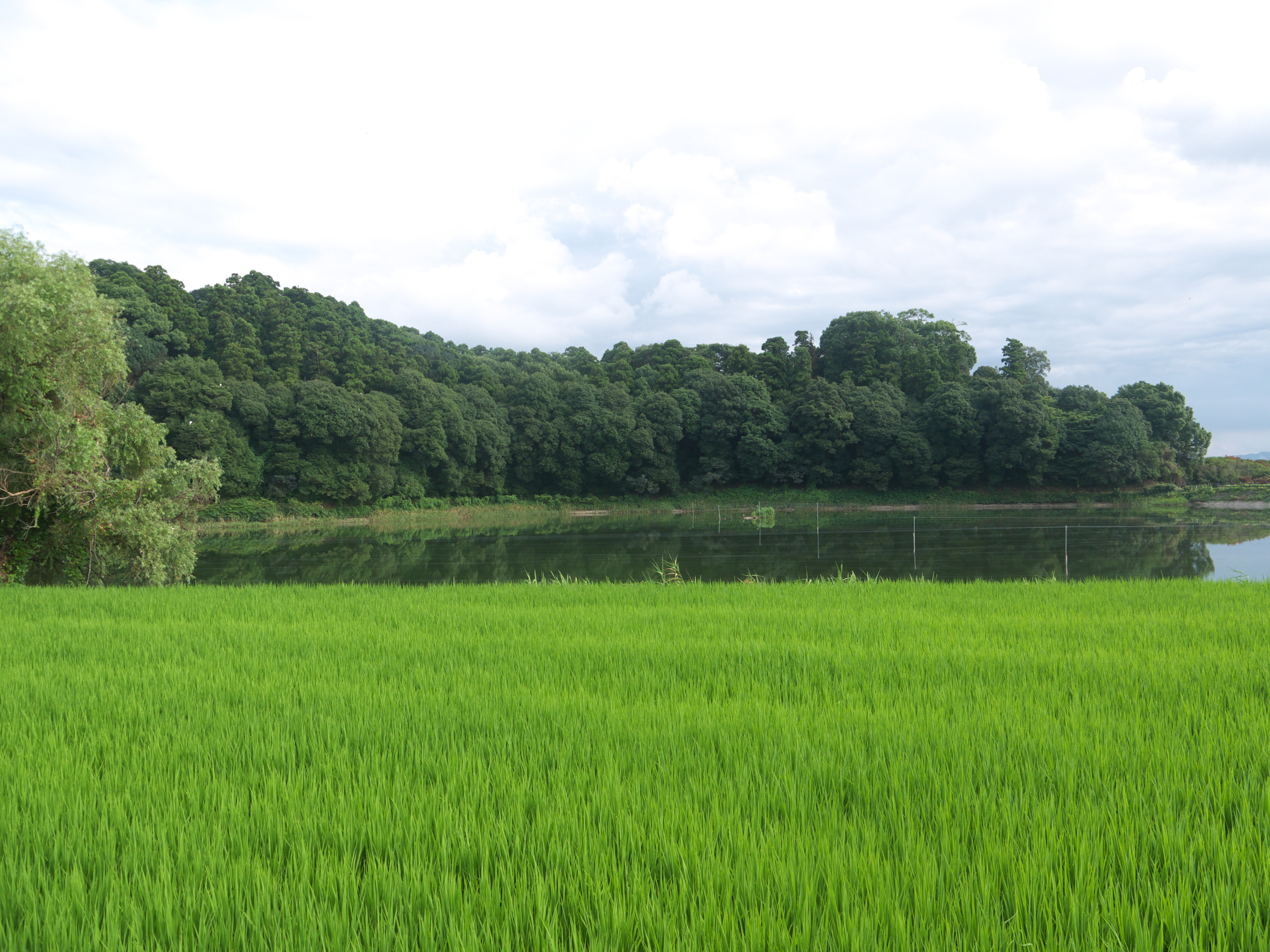
Oike Pond

On February 20, 2013, the first survey was realized at the request of the Japanese Archaeological Association and others.

In April 2018 (Heisei 30), the Archaeological Institute of Kashihara, Nara Prefecture, examined 26 jar-shaped earthenware and jar-shaped Haniwa terracotta figures excavated from the anterior section and 54 fragments of funerary ritual pottery excavated from the top of the posterior circle, and found that while the pottery in the anterior section is local soil, the soil in the posterior circle is very similar in character to that of the Kibi region. This suggests that the finished products manufactured in the Kibi area were arranged in the posterior part and that the power of the Kibi area was very powerful and played an important role in the construction of the Hashihaka Kofun tumulus.

=== Documentaries ===
- ETV special "Birth: Yamato Kingship – Now the Anterior Posterior Circular Tumulus Speaks Out" (March 27, 2021, NHK E-TV)

== Cultural property ==
=== National Historic Site ===
- Hashihaka Kofun Peripheral Moat – Designated February 9, 2017

== See also ==
- Kofun system
- Makimuku ruins
- Yamatai Honshu Theory
- Yayoi period

== Bibliography ==
- 笠井, 新也 (March 1922). "邪馬臺國は大和である". 考古学雑誌. 12 (7). 日本考古学会: 384–397. ISSN 0003-8075.
- 笠井, 新也 (April 1924). "卑彌呼卽ち倭迹々日百襲姬命". 考古学雑誌. 14 (7). 日本考古学会: 396–408. ISSN 0003-8075.
- 笠井, 新也 (July 1942). "卑弥呼の冢墓と箸墓". 考古学雑誌. 32 (7). 日本考古学会: 344–368. ISSN 0003-8075.
- 笠井, 新也 (March 1943). "箸墓古墳の考古學的考察". 考古学雑誌. 33 (3). 日本考古学会: 114–138. ISSN 0003-8075.
- 近藤, 義郎 (July 1968). "前方後円墳の成立と変遷（第14回総会研究報告）". 考古学研究. 15 (1). 考古学研究会: 24–32. ISSN 0386-9148.
- 梁, 方仲 (August 1980). "中国歴代度量衡変遷表". 『中国歴代戸口、田地、田賦統計』. 上海人民出版社. pp. 540–541. ISBN 7208011761.
- 白石, 太一郎 (April 1999). 古墳とヤマト政権-古代国家はいかに形成されたか-. 文春新書036. 文藝春秋. ISBN 4166600362.
- 寺沢, 薫 (December 2000). 王権誕生. 日本の歴史02. 講談社. ISBN 4062689022.
- 宝賀, 寿男 (September 2001). "卑弥呼の冢". 季刊・古代史の海 (25). 「古代史の海」の会. ISSN 1341-5522.
- 宝賀, 寿男 (2001-12-20). "卑弥呼の冢補論-祇園山古墳とその周辺-". 季刊・古代史の海 (26). 「古代史の海」の会: 62–96. ISSN 1341-5522.
- 寺沢, 薫 (October 2002). 箸墓古墳周辺の調査-国営農地防災溜池工事に伴う箸墓古墳周辺第7・9・10次発掘調査報告書-. 奈良県文化財調査報告書第89集. 橿原考古学研究所.
- 広瀬, 和雄 (July 2003). 前方後円墳国家. 角川選書355. 角川書店. ISBN 4047033553.
- 広瀬, 和雄 (2005). "第3回 転換期の考古学研究-弥生・古墳時代の畿内を一例として-（1）". 歴史地名通信（月報）. 49. 平凡社. ISSN 0916-0221.
- 橿原考古学研究所 (2008). ホケノ山古墳の研究. 橿原考古学研究所研究成果第10冊. 橿原考古学研究所. ISBN 978-4902777611.
  - 奥山, 誠義. "ホケノ山古墳中心埋葬施設から出土した木材の14C年代測定". ホケノ山古墳の研究. pp. 191–192.
  - 岡林, 孝作; 水野, 敏典; 北山, 峰生. "実年代について". ホケノ山古墳の研究. pp. 289–291.
- 石野, 博信 (2008). 邪馬台国の候補地 纒向遺跡. 遺跡を学ぶ051. 新泉社. ISBN 978-4787709318.
- 西本, 豊弘 (2009-01-01). "炭素年代測定による高精度編年体系の構築（巻頭言）" (PDF). 弥生農耕の起源と東アジア ニューズレター11号. 国立歴史民俗博物館: 3.
- 春成, 秀爾; 小林, 謙一; 坂本, 稔; 今村, 峯雄 (2011-03-31). "古墳出現期の炭素14年代測定". 国立歴史民俗博物館研究報告. 第163集. 国立歴史民俗博物館. pp. 133–176. ISSN 0286-7400.
- 白石, 太一郎 (2012). "箸墓古墳と大市墓". 天皇陵古墳を考える. 学生社. pp. 9–66. ISBN 978-4311203435.
- 白石, 太一郎 (2013). 古墳からみた倭国の形成と展開. 日本歴史私の最新講義07. 敬文舎. ISBN 978-4906822072.
- 桜井市文化財協会 (2014-01-16). Hashinaka-始まりの前方後円墳-（平成25年度特別展）. 桜井市立埋蔵文化財センター展示図録第40冊. 財団法人桜井市文化財協会.
