= Sharin-seki =

Type of Japanese archaeological artefact

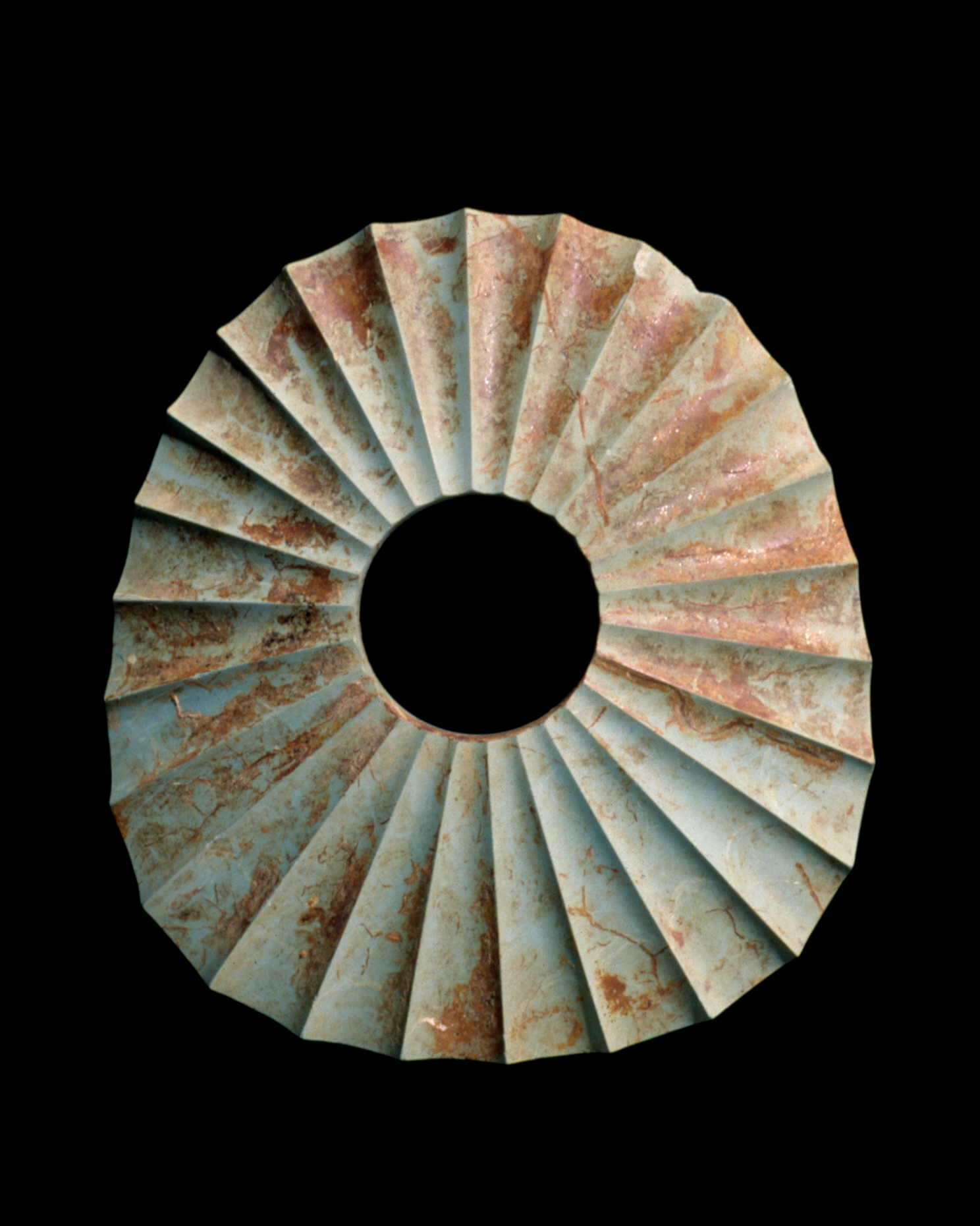
4th-century sharin-seki, carved from green tuff (21.6 by 19.4 by 2.9 centimetres (8.5 in × 7.6 in × 1.1 in)) (Metropolitan Museum of Art)

Sharin-seki (車輪石), sometimes translated literally as "carriage-wheel stones" or alternatively as "wheel-shaped stones", are a type of archaeological artefact known from early- to mid-Kofun period Japan.

== Overview ==
Sharin-seki take the form of a stone bracelet with radial fluting. They have been known as such since the Edo period, due to their resemblance to a spoked wheel. Their development has been traced back to the shell bracelets and/or armlets that originated in the Yayoi period, those of the Strombidae family from the seas to the south, around Amami Ōshima and the Ryūkyūs beyond, being particularly prized. Often made of jasper, they imitate shells such as those of Scutellastra optima, a limpet in the Patellidae family. Like shell "bracelets", bracelet-shaped stones may have been worn instead as pendants, although it is also possible these talismanic objects served primarily as grave goods. Similarities with Chinese jade bi may suggest continental influence, with glass bi known from northern Kyūshū.

Alongside kuwagata-ishi ("hoe-shaped stones") and ishi-kushiro ("stone bracelets"), sharin-seki are one of the three types of bracelet-shaped stone artefact known in large numbers from kofun of the early- to mid-Kofun period. Associating these objects with priests involved in kami-worship, archaeologist Shiraishi Taichirō suggests that, in burials where large numbers are found, where accompanied with little in the way of weapons and armour, these relate to "magical-religious" leaders, likely women, whereas where found alongside weaponry and armour in significant quantities, we are dealing with chieftains with "priest-like power". Their absence from later burials may relate to the increasing cultural influence of contemporary China and the arrival of Buddhism.

== National Treasures ==
A series of nineteen fourth-century jasper sharin-seki from Tōdaijiyama Kofun in Tenri, Nara Prefecture, is among the assemblage of objects (including the Tōdaijiyama Sword) from the tumulus designated a National Treasure in 2017 and now at Tokyo National Museum.

== Gallery ==
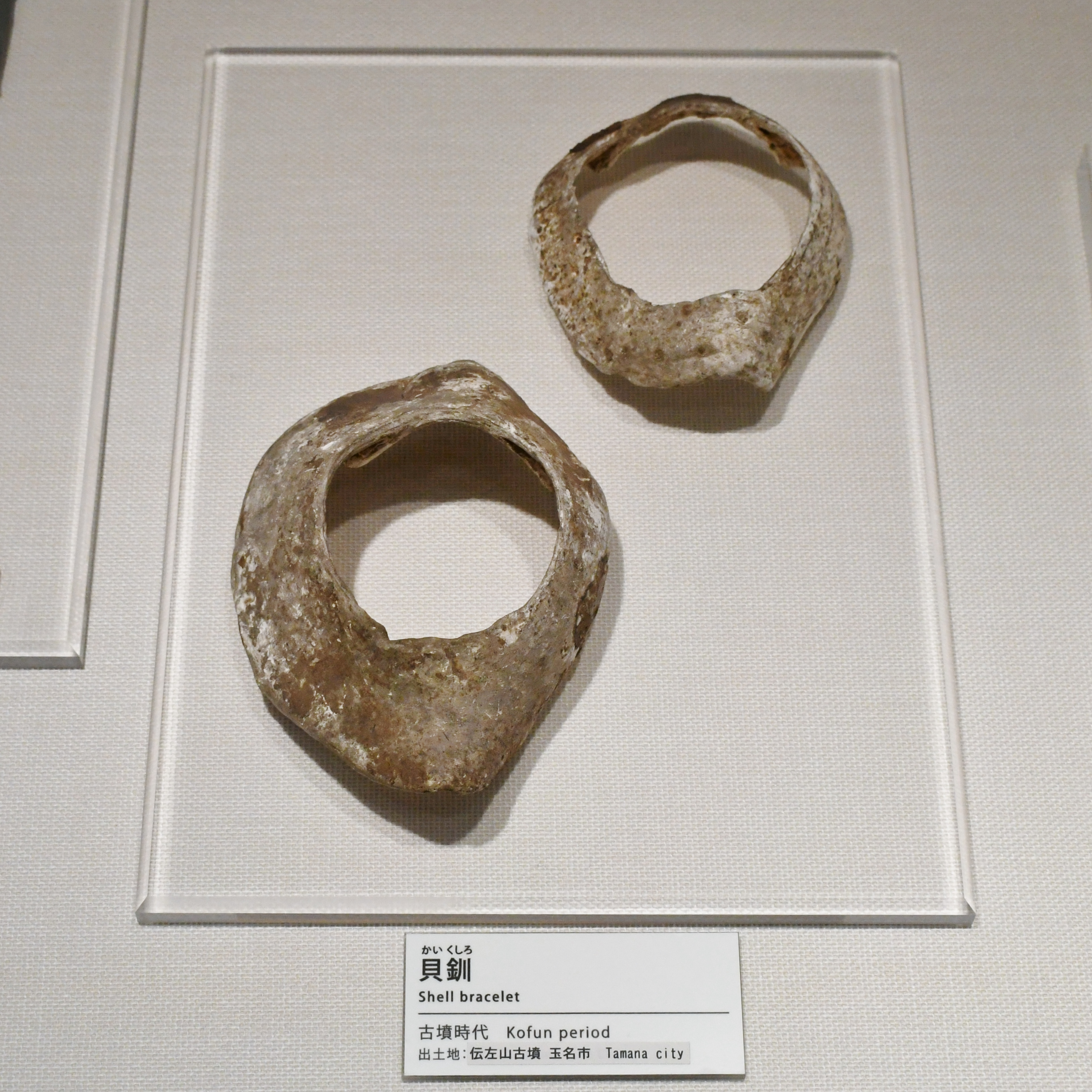
Shell bracelets from Denzayama Kofun, Kumamoto Prefecture

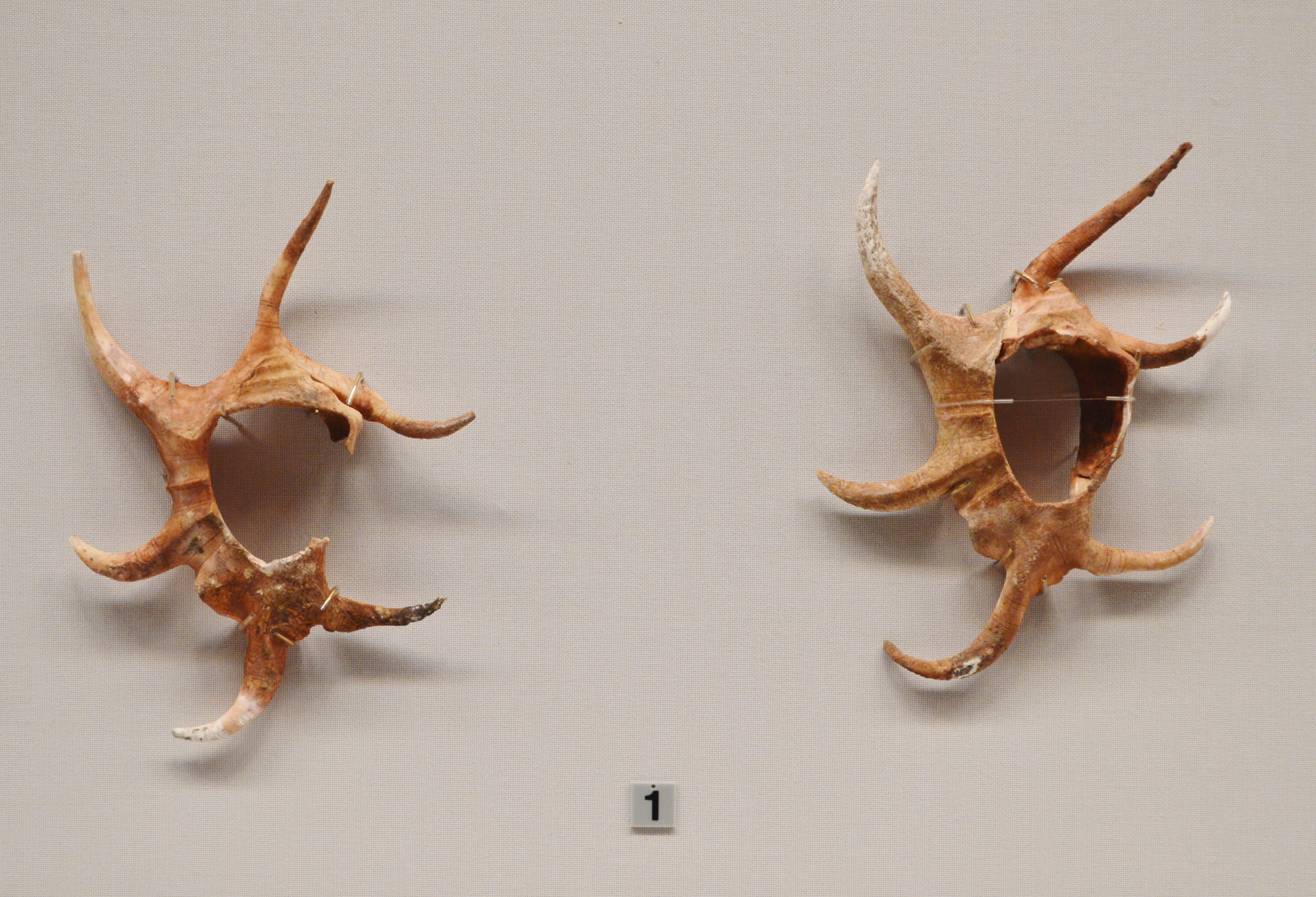
Shell bracelets from Shōrinzan Kofun, Shizuoka Prefecture

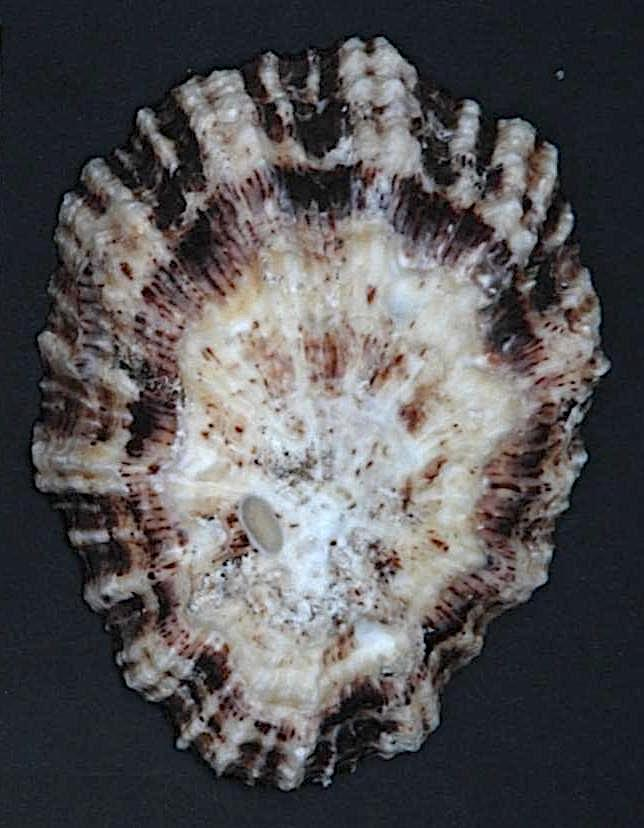
Scutellastra optima (Pilsbry, 1927), type locality: Yakushima(Naturalis Biodiversity Center)

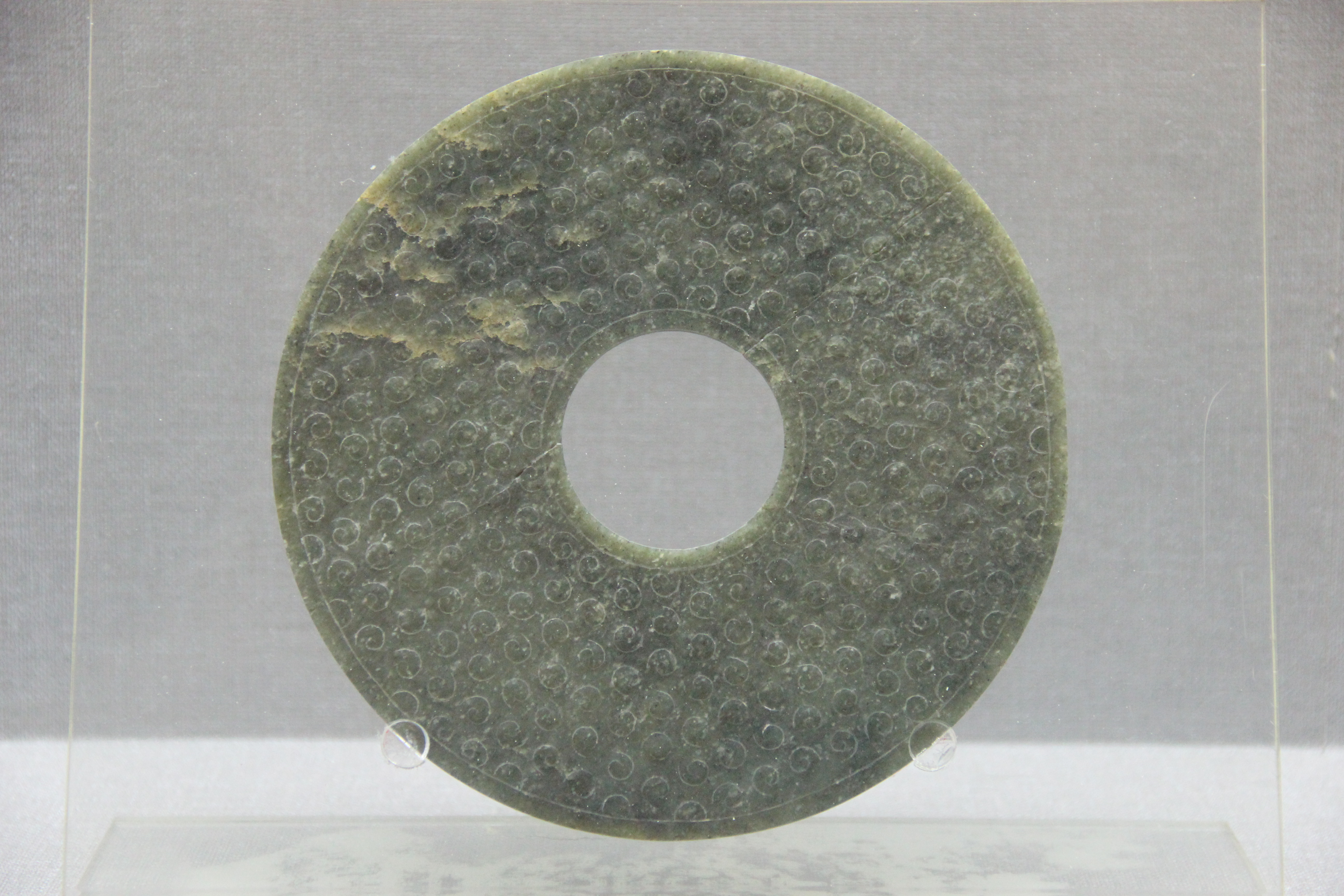
Han jade bi (Shanxi Museum)

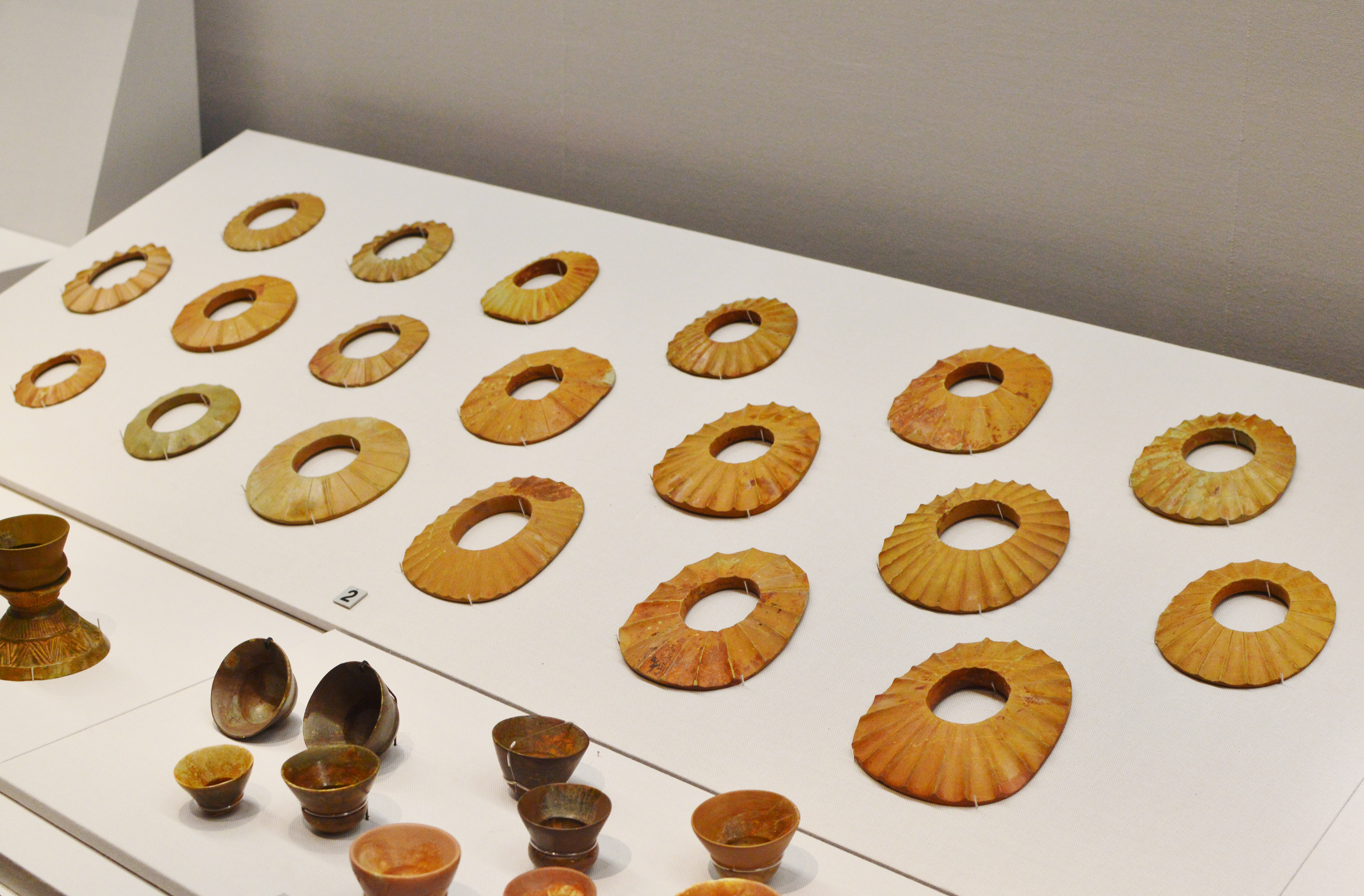
Sharin-seki (NT) from Tōdaijiyama Kofun, Nara Prefecture

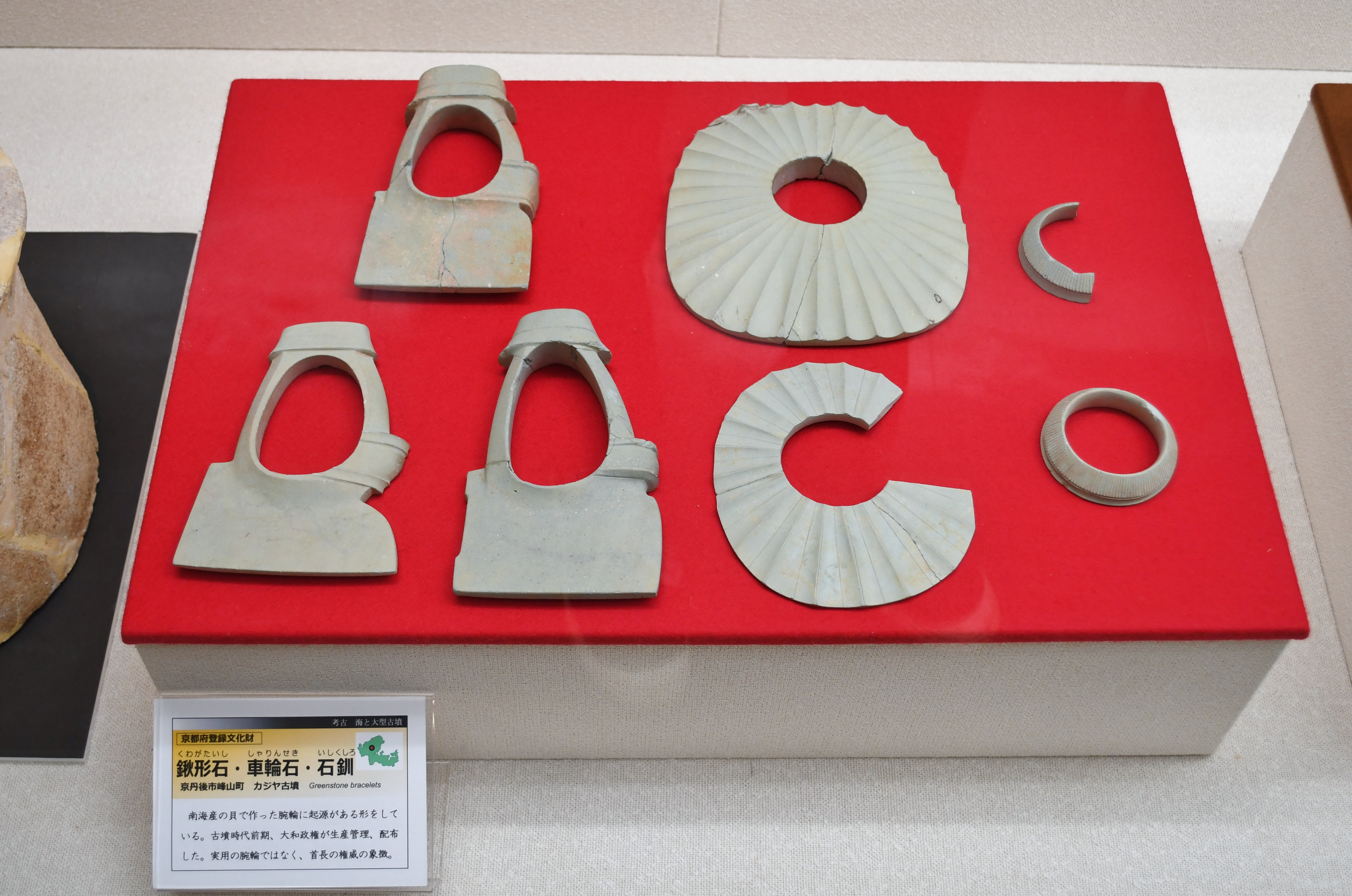
Kuwagata-ishi, sharin-seki, and ishi-kushiro from Kajiya Kofun, Kyoto Prefecture

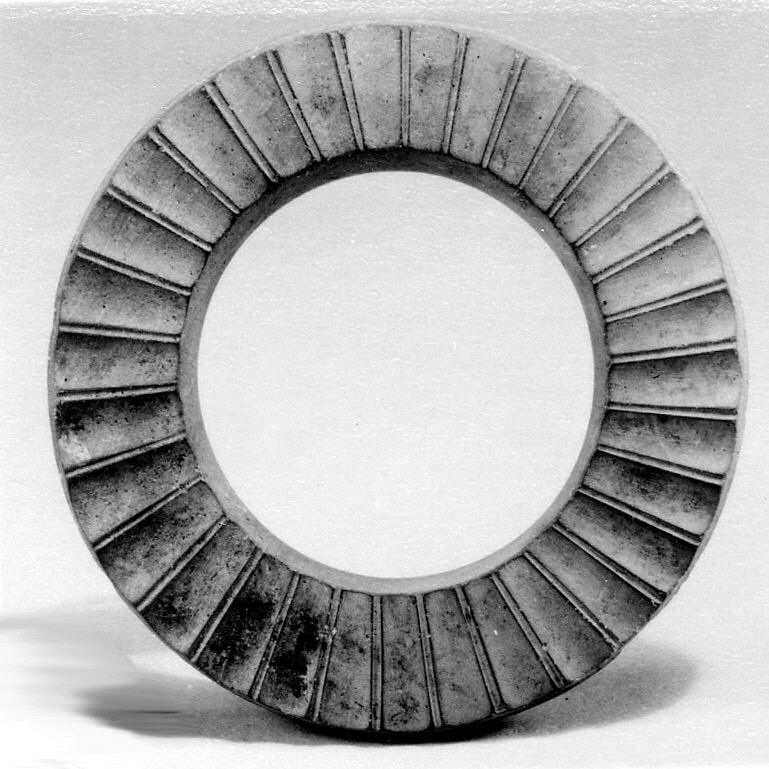
c. 4th-century radially-grooved ishi-kushiro
(Metropolitan Museum of Art)

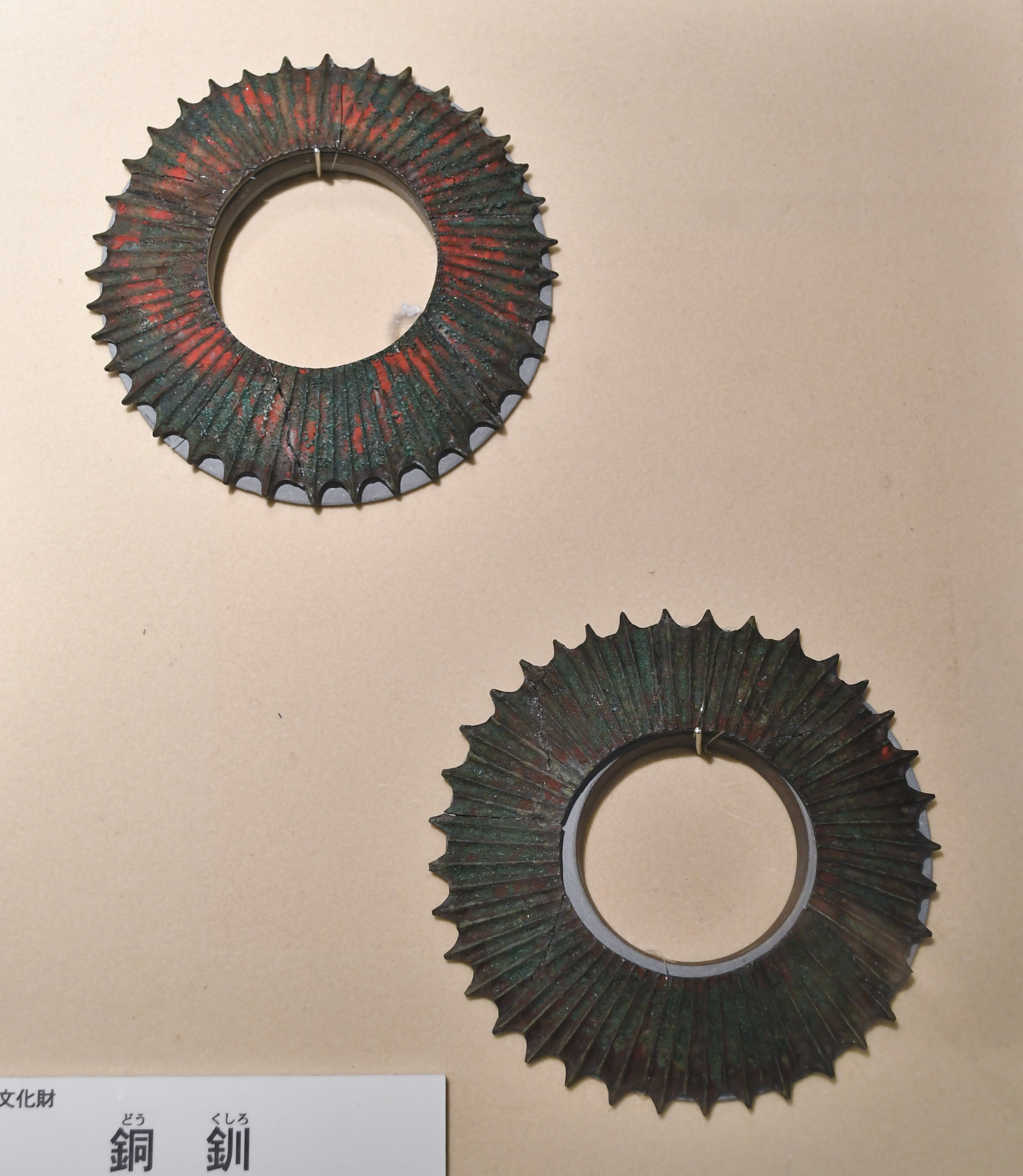
Bronze kushiro from Shibagahara Kofun, Kyoto Prefecture

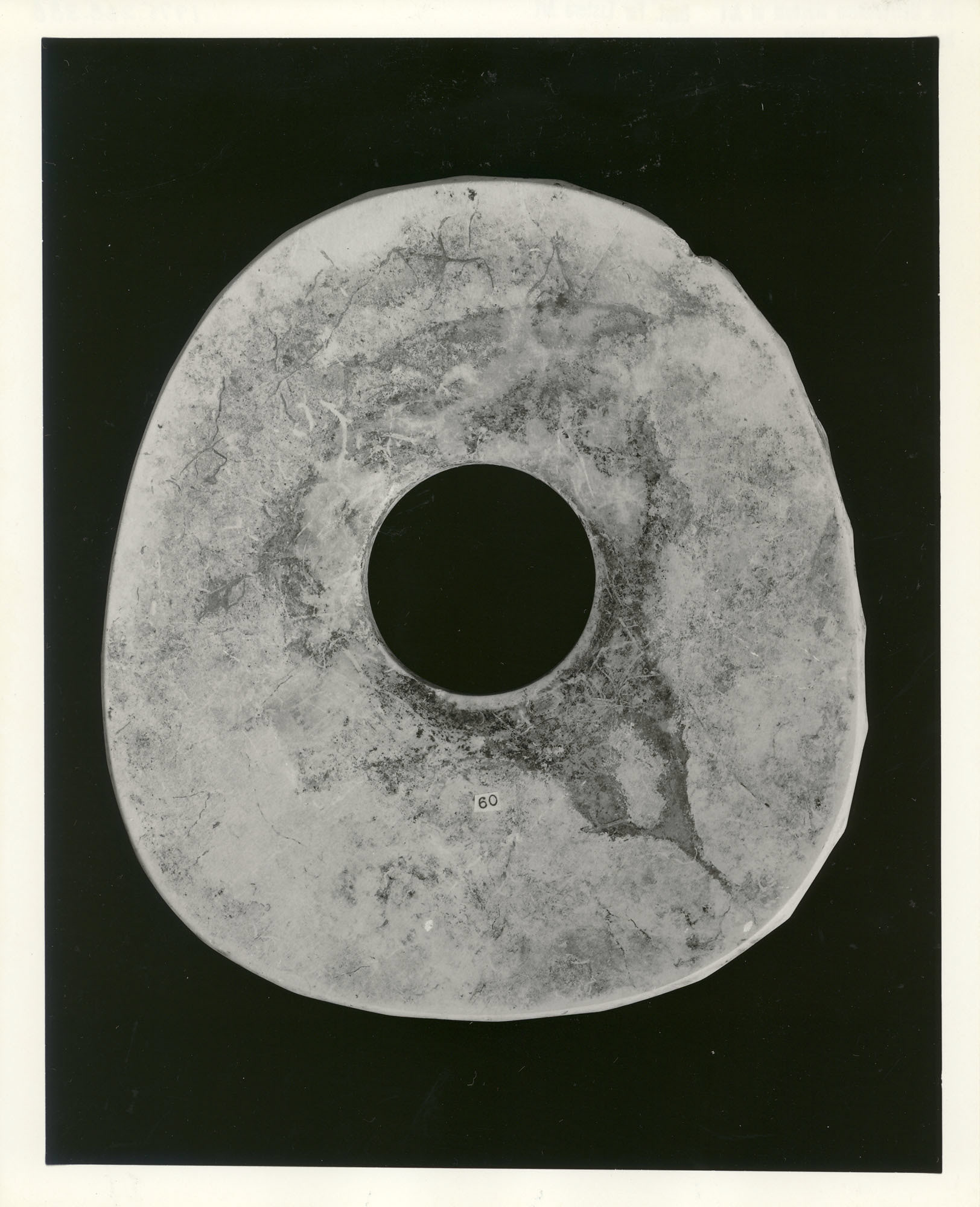
Back of the 4th-century sharin-seki above (Metropolitan Museum of Art)

== See also ==
- List of National Treasures of Japan (archaeological materials)
- Kofun system
