= Inaridai Sword =

Ancient iron sword excavated in Chiba Prefecture, Japan

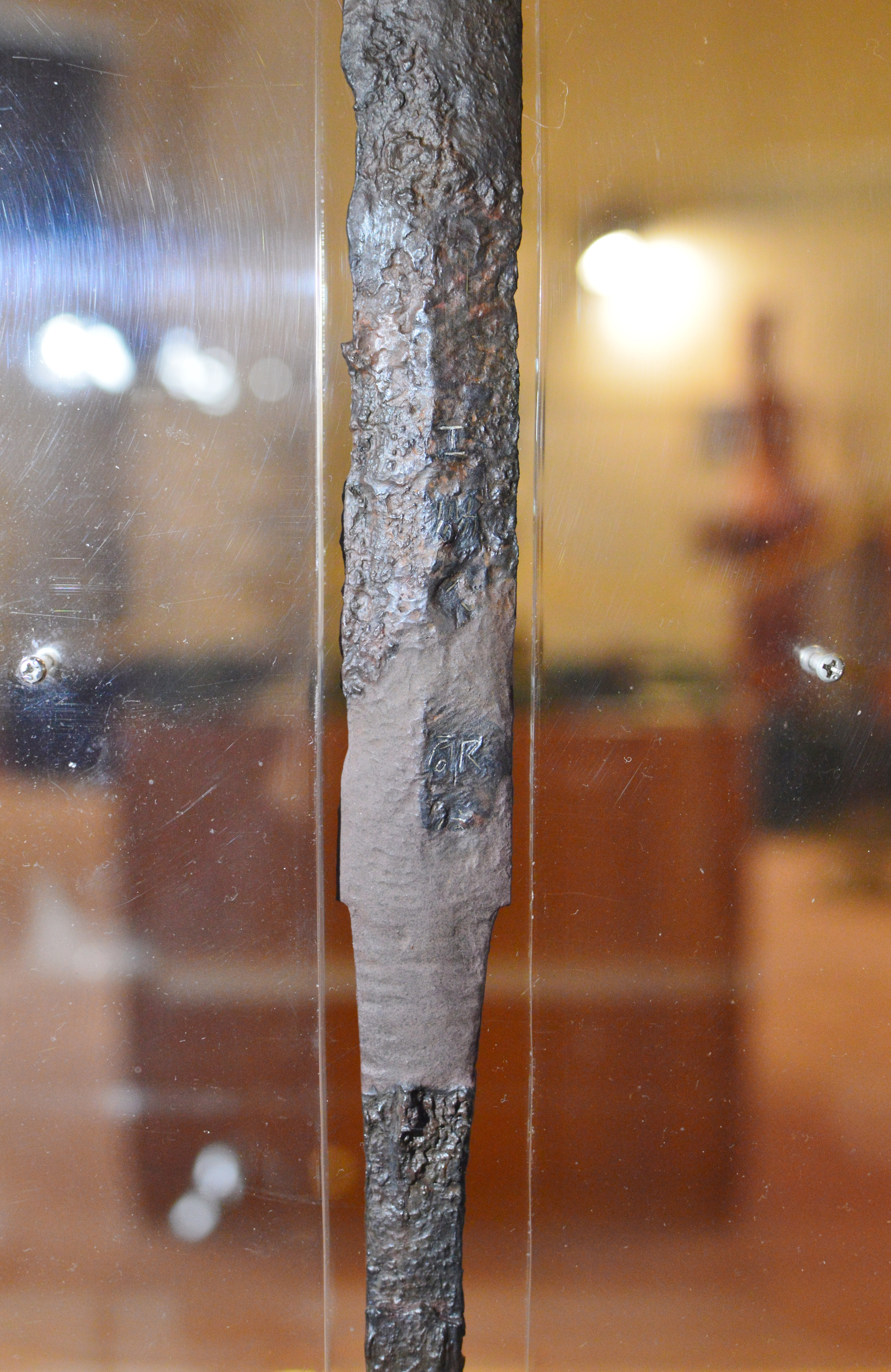
Close-up of a replica of the Inaridai Sword on display in the Ichihara History Museum

Inaridai Sword, also known as Inaridai No. 1 Kofun tumulus Iron Sword (稲荷台一号墳出土鉄剣 Inaridai Ichi-gōfun Shutsudo Tekken), is an ancient iron sword excavated in Inaridai No. 1 Kofun tumulus in Chiba Prefecture, Japan. The sword was probably forged in Kinai region in the 5th century and buried with the deceased person in the late of the century. Its silver-inlaid inscription is the important source of the Japanese domestic politics in the period.

== Inscription ==
The original Chinese text is as follows;

王賜？︁？︁敬安 / 此？︁(廷)？︁(刀)？︁？︁？︁

In English;

King bestows (...) Own [this] with respect. / This sword is (...).

== Interpretation ==
In the tumulus two men were buried in each wooden coffin. Artifacts excavated around the tomb indicate the two were local warrior class nobles in the 5th century. Some scholars speculate the king mentioned in the inscription was King Sai, one of the five kings of Wa, written in the Chinese historical text Book of Song.

In the Kofun period the polity in Kinai region advanced toward the unification of Japan. The sword, which was bestowed to the local ruling family by the king of Wa, is regarded as an example of the birth of the ancient unified state.

== See also ==
- Seven-Branched Sword
- Inariyama Sword
- Eta Funayama Sword
- Tōdaijiyama Sword
