= Kuwagata-ishi =

Type of Japanese archaeological artefact

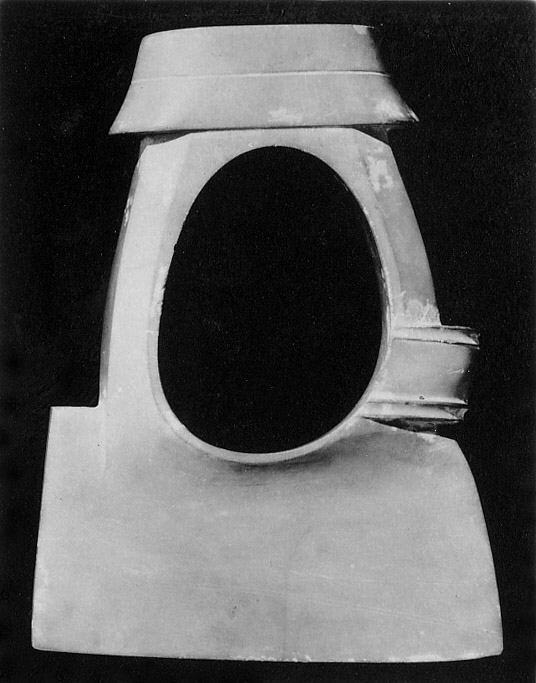
4th-century kuwagata-ishi, carved from green tuff (15.9 by 11.7 by 2.5 centimetres (6.26 in × 4.61 in × 0.98 in)) (Metropolitan Museum of Art)

Kuwagata-ishi (鍬形石), sometimes translated as "hoe-shaped stones", "hoe-shaped bracelets", or "plough-shaped stones", are a type of archaeological artefact known from Kofun-period Japan.

== Overview ==
Kuwagata-ishi take the form of a stone bracelet in the shape of the blade of a hoe. Their development has been traced back to shell bracelets and/or armlets of the Yayoi period. Alongside sharin-seki ("carriage-wheel stones") and ishi-kushiro ("stone bracelets"), kuwagata-ishi are one of the three types of bracelet-shaped stone artefact known in large numbers from kofun of the early- to mid-Kofun period. While they may have been worn as pendants, it is thought their primary function was to serve as grave goods.

== National Treasures ==
A series of twenty-four fourth-century jasper kuwagata-ishi from Tōdaijiyama Kofun in Tenri, Nara Prefecture, is among the assemblage of objects (including the Tōdaijiyama Sword) from the tumulus designated a National Treasure in 2017 and now at Tokyo National Museum.

== Gallery ==
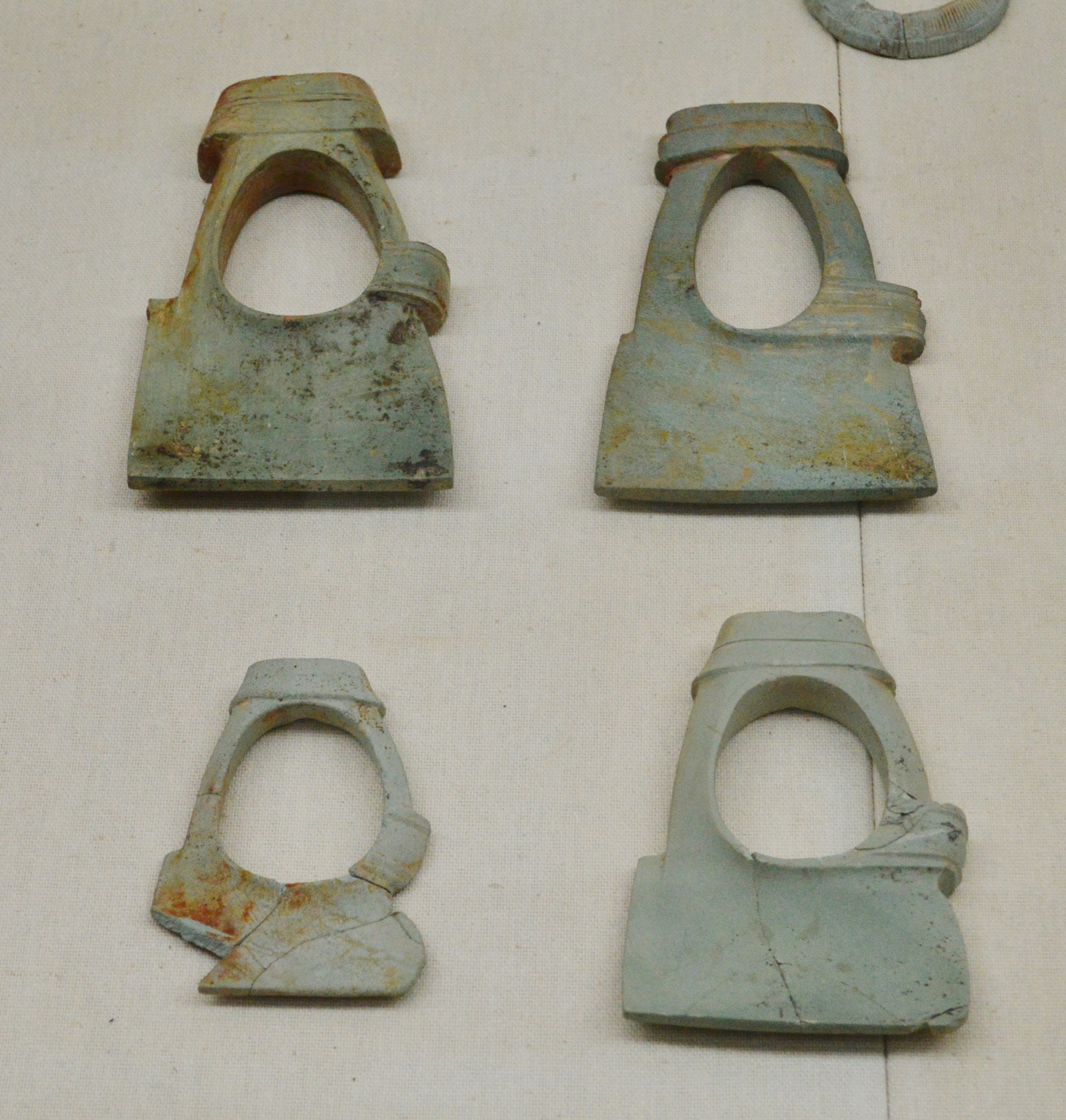
Kuwagata-ishi from Chausuzuka Kofun, Osaka Prefecture

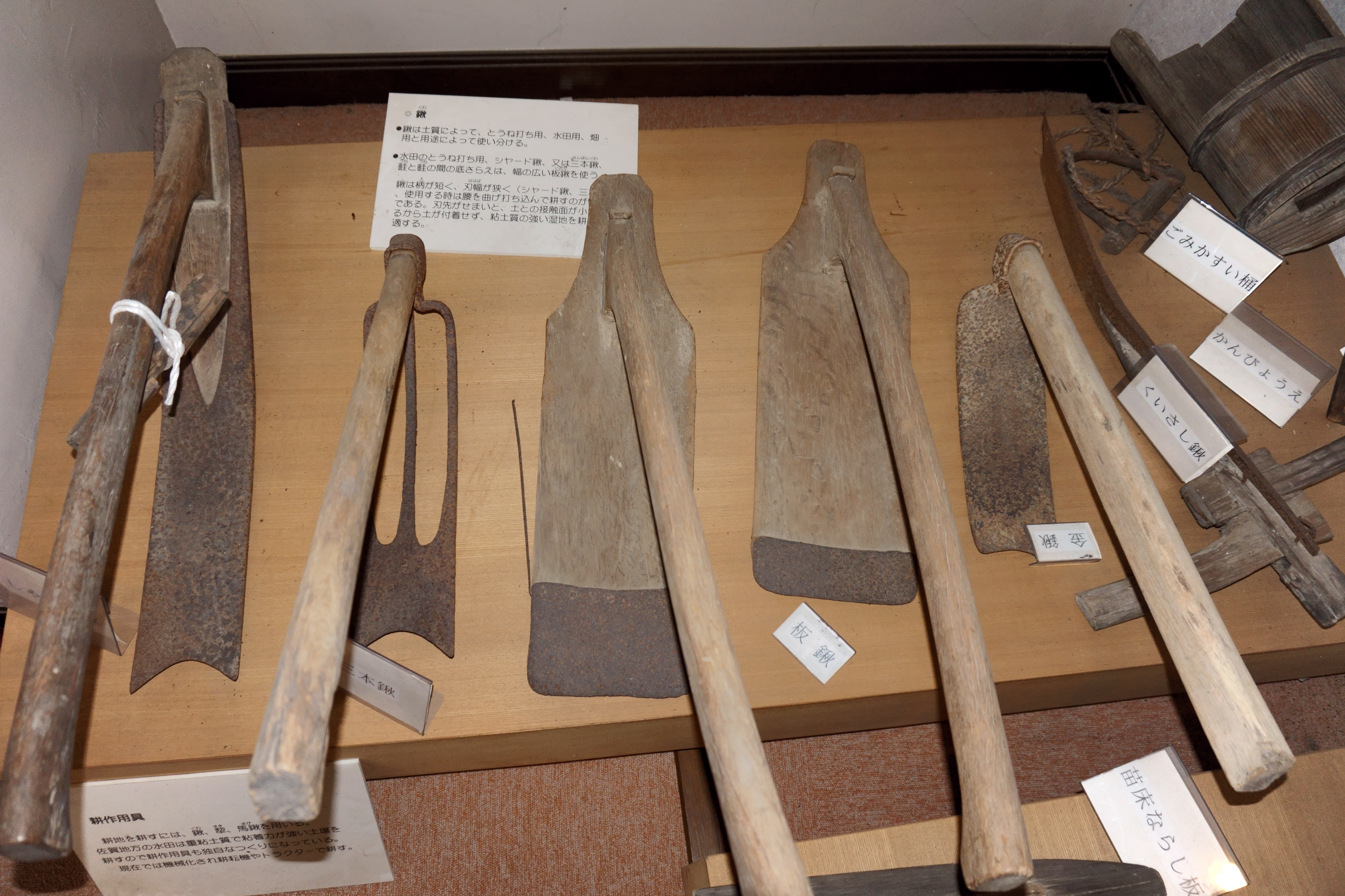
Hoes of recent times in Saga Prefecture

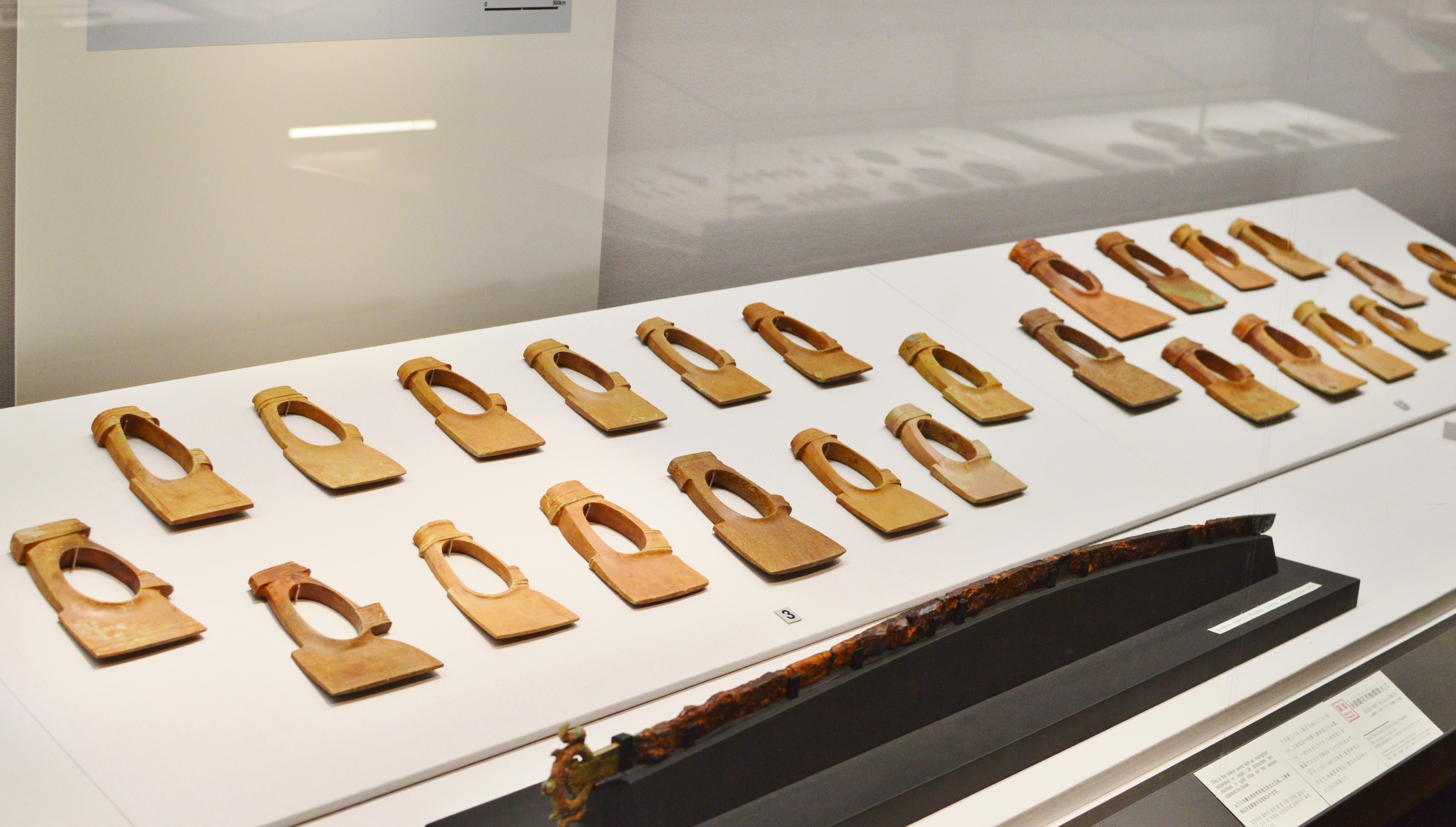
Kuwagata-ishi (NT) from Tōdaijiyama Kofun

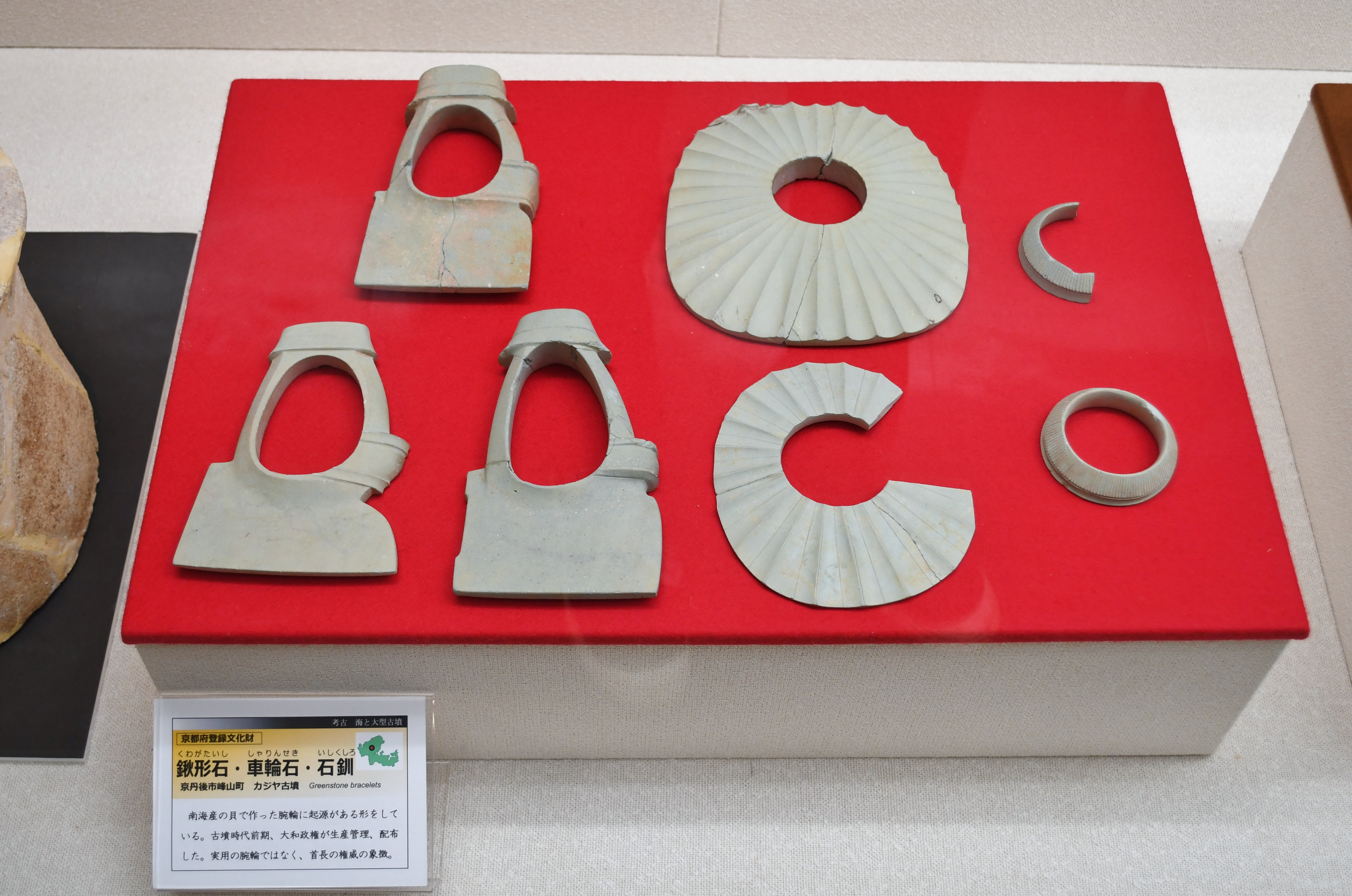
Kuwagata-ishi, sharin-seki, and ishi-kushiro from Kajiya Kofun in Kyōtango

== See also ==
- List of National Treasures of Japan (archaeological materials)
- Kofun system
