= Japanese civil war =

Japanese civil war may refer to:

- Civil War of Wa
- Sengoku period
- Boshin War
