= Totsuka-no-Tsurugi =

Type of sword in Japanese mythology

Totsuka-no-Tsurugi (Japanese: 十拳剣; lit. 'Sword of Ten Hand-Breadths') is not a specific sword, but a common noun for any sword of this length. In Japanese mythology, numerous deities own a sword of this kind. Some examples of well-known Totsuka-no-Tsurugi:

1. The totsuka sword used by Izanagi to kill his offspring Kagu-tsuchi. This one is also named Ame-no-ohabari or Ama-no-Ohabari (天の尾羽張; lit. 'sword of Takamagahara with blades on both sides of the tip').
2. The totsuka sword used in the oath between Amaterasu and Susanoo. Amaterasu received this sword from Susanoo, snapped it to three pieces, and created the Three Munakata Goddesses from its debris. This sword was not named.
3. Another totsuka sword in Susanoo's possession, which he used to slay Orochi. This sword is also named Ama-no-Habakiri or Ame-no-Habakiri (天羽々斬), Worochi-no-Aramasa (蛇之麁正), or Futsushimitama-no-tsurugi (布都斯魂剣). The sword is enshrined as the shintai of Isonokami Shrine.
4. The totsuka sword wielded by Takemikazuchi in the quelling of the Middle Country. This sword is known as Futsunomitama-no-tsurugi (布都御魂剣), and is the main enshrined dedication in Isonokami Shrine.

== Susanoo legend ==
After the sword's owner, Susanoo, was banished from heaven by the reason of killing one of Amaterasu's attendants and destroying her rice fields, he descended to the Province of Izumo where he met Ashinazuchi, an elderly man who told him that the Yamata no Orochi ("Eight-Branched Serpent"), who had consumed seven of his eight daughters, was coming soon to eat the last one: Kushinada-hime.

Susanoo decided to help the family and investigated the creature, soon he begged Ashinazuchi for permission to marry Kushinada-hime, which was granted; having his plan ready, he transformed his wife into a comb so he could have her near in the battle. As the great snake came, it put each one of his eight heads through the gates the gods built, searching for the daughter; as a bait the gods had put big amounts of sake after each gate, the snake took the bait and got drunk; having an easy chance, Susanoo took the Worochi no Ara-masa and cut every head off the snake, proceeding to the tails, in the fourth one he found an exceptionally great sword, the Kusanagi-no-Tsurugi.

Having the sword in his hands he returned to the heaven offering the sword as a reconciliation gift to his sister Amaterasu.

== In popular culture ==
One of Susanoo's blades provided the inspiration for multiple Yu-Gi-Oh! Trading Card Game cards, Mitsurugi no Mikoto, Aramasa and Ame no Habakiri no Mitsurugi.
