= Isonokami Shrine =

Shinto shrine in Nara Prefecture, Japan

Isonokami Shrine 石上神宮
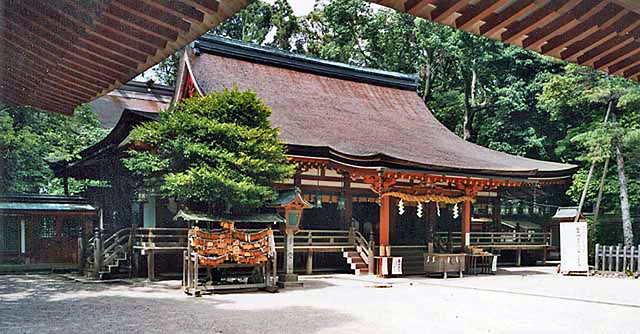
- The haiden, a National Treasure of Japan

- Location within Japan

Religion
- Affiliation: Shinto
- Deity: Futsu-no-mitama-ōkami

Location
- Location: 384 Furu-chō, Tenri-shi, Nara-ken
- Coordinates: 34°35′53″N 135°51′09″E

Architecture
- Style: Nagare-zukuri
- Founder: Emperor Sujin
- Established: 91 BC (legendary), more likely 2nd or 3rd century

Isonokami Shrine (石上神宮, Isonokami-jingū; also Isonokami-futsu-no-mitama-jinja (石上布都御魂神社), Furu-ōmyojin (布留大明神) etc.) is a Shinto shrine located in the hills of Furu in Tenri, Nara Prefecture, Japan. It is one of the oldest extant Shinto shrines in Japan and has housed several significant artifacts.

Isonokami shrine was highly regarded in the ancient era, and frequented by many members of the Imperial Family. It played a pivotal role in Japan's early history, especially during the 3rd to 5th centuries.

The shrine is at the northern end of the Yamanobe no michi, the oldest road in Japan.

== History ==
It is unknown which kami was initially worshipped at Isonokami shrine. Isonokami Shrine was supposedly built in the 7th year of Emperor Sujin's reign, or the 91 BC. However, there is little record of Sujin's existence or identity, and therefore the claim is deemed legendary. The construction of a structure that can be identified as a Shinto shrine in the Isonokami area probably dates two or three centuries later. Despite this, it is not unlikely that the Isonokami area was considered a sacred site during that time, as archeological digs have found many ritual objects, and Isonokami worship was already firmly established when they were adopted by the Yamato leaders in the 4th century.

Early records show that the shrine was an emerging center of Yamato power, flavored with a military overtone. Archeological evidences shows that around the 4th century, Yamato kings and nobility constructed more and more palaces and buildings in the shrine's vicinity. Prior to this, the Yamato leaders identified with kami worshipped at Mount Miwa, but may have turned to Isonokami for its martial implications. Myths written in the Nihon Shoki clearly attempt to link the Yamato court to Isonokami shrine. According to the Nihon Shoki, Emperor Suinin's eldest son, Prince Inishiki ordered a thousand swords made and was placed in charge of Isonokami's treasures. He then founded the Mononobe clan, who patronized the shrine for many generations. Indeed, many of the state's iron weaponry were kept in the shrine's storehouses. When the Mononobe clan collapsed, it was reformed as the Isonokami clan.

The shrine became the object of Imperial patronage during the early Heian period. In 965, Emperor Murakami ordered that Imperial messengers be sent to report important events to the guardian kami of Japan. These heihaku were initially presented to 16 shrines including the Isonokami Shrine.

From 1871 to 1946, the Isonokami Shrine was officially designated one of the Kanpei-taisha (官幣大社), meaning that it stood in the first rank of government supported shrines.

== Architecture ==
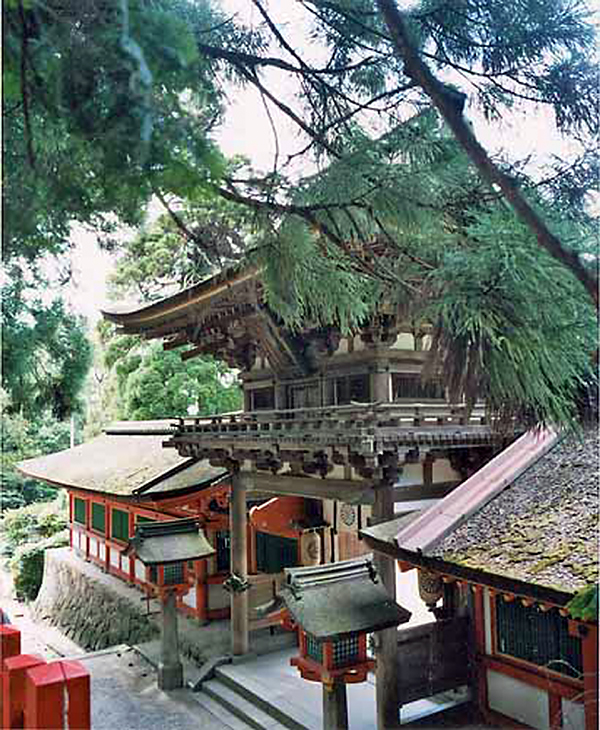
Gate to the Isonokami Shrine

Isonokami shrine is surrounded by Cryptomeria (sugi). A waka poem from the Man'yōshū anthology mentions Isonokami shrine, surrounded by holy cedar trees.

The current site of Isonokami shrine may have been the site of an earlier religious structure, the Izumo-taisha. This is suspected because of a secondary shrine to Izumo-takeo found near the main shrine, but on higher ground. Since secondary shrines are never built higher than the principal shrine, some have concluded that it was an older structure that stood before the current one.

The honden, or main hall, is built in the nagare-zukuri style.

== Enshrined deity ==
The main enshrined dedication is to Futsu-no-mitama (布都御魂), the kami of a legendary sword (futsu-no-mitama-no-tsurugi) that was given to by Takemikazuchi in Kumano and used by Emperor Jimmu, the first Emperor of Japan. However, the sword itself is hidden in Isonokami shrine, but the second sword is visible in Kashima Shrine, Ibaraki.

== Artifacts ==
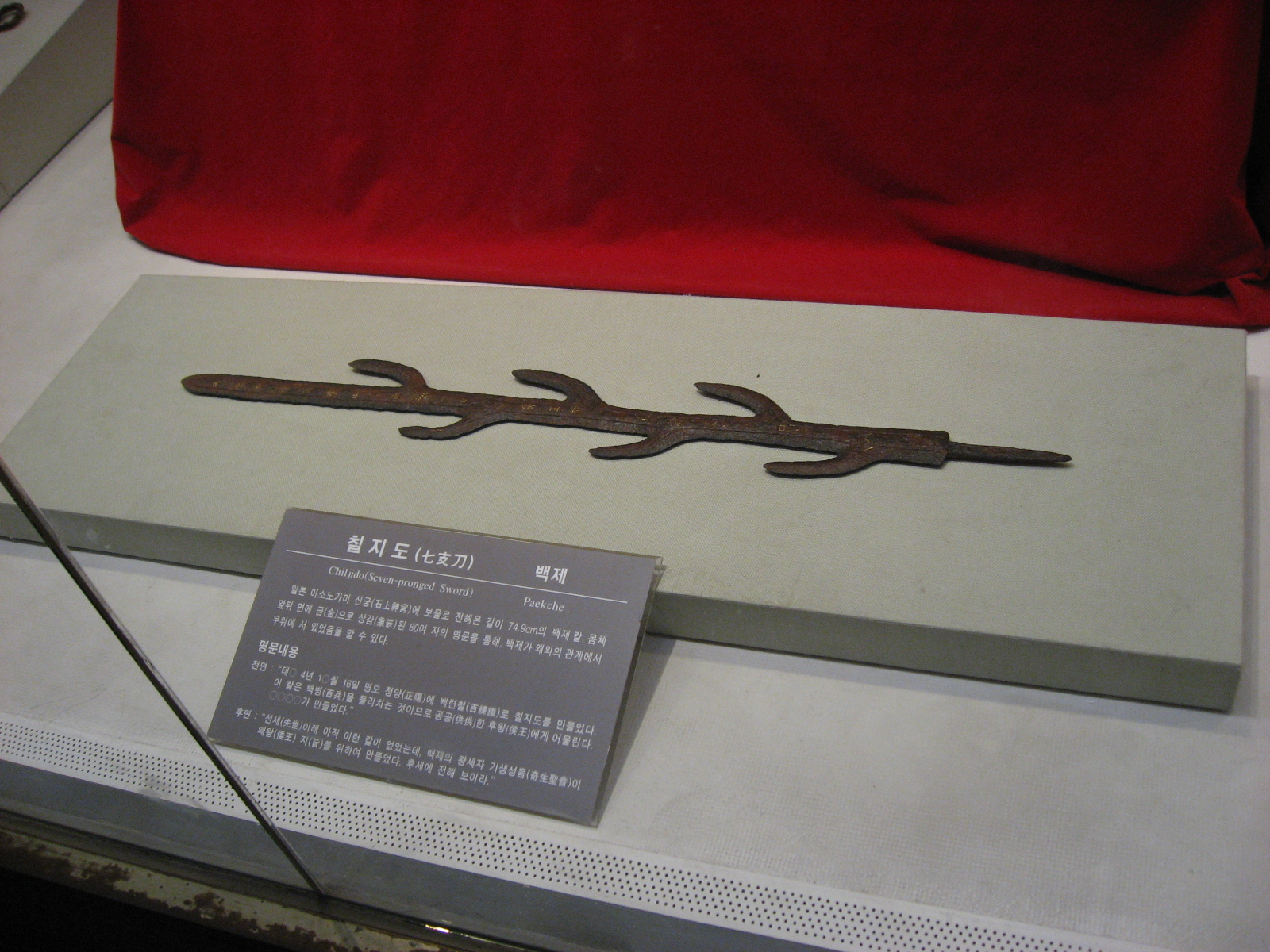
A replica of the seven-branched sword in South Korea.

The Nanatsusaya-no-Tachi, a seven-branched sword, is housed in Isonokami shrine. It was given to the Yamato king by the crown prince of Baekje, a kingdom on the Korean Peninsula. The sword has been kept in Isonokami shrine since ancient times, perhaps as early as the 4th century when it was received from Baekje. It was rediscovered in 1873, and its gold inlaid inscription has proven to be a valuable historical resource. The sword is currently not available for public viewing.

The Totsuka-no-Tsurugi, a legendary sword, is also said to be kept at Isonokami shrine. According to the Kojiki, the sword was used by the god Susanoo to slay the Yamata-no-Orochi, a giant serpent with eight heads and eight tails. Priests at the shrine do not allow anyone to see or inspect the sword.

Ten treasures brought by Amenohiboko are thought to be housed in Isonokami shrine. According to the Nihon Shoki, Amenohiboko was a prince from Korea who settled in Japan. The ten treasures he brought are known as the Tokusa-no-Kandakara, and they are as follows:

- Okitsu-kagami (A mirror)
- Hetsu-kagami (A mirror)
- Yatsuka-no-tsurugi (A sword)
- Iku-tama (A jewel)
- Makarukaheshi-tama (A jewel)
- Taru-tama (A jewel)
- Chikaheshi-no-tama (A jewel)
- Orochi-no-hire (A type of long scarf worn by women)
- Hachi-no-hire (A type of long scarf worn by women)
- Kusagusa-no-mono-no-hire (A type of long scarf worn by women)

== National Treasures ==
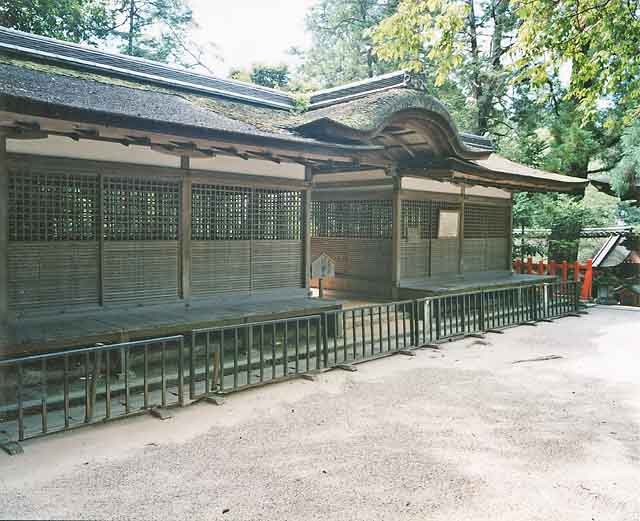
Haiden of Izumo Takeo secondary shrine (a national treasure)

=== National Treasures of Japan ===
See National Treasures of Japan

- The haiden, or hall of worship, with irimoya style roofing, Kamakura period
- The haiden at the Izumo Takeo secondary shrine
- The Nanatsusaya-no-Tachi

=== Important Cultural Properties ===
See: Important Cultural Properties

- The rōmon, or main gate
- Two iron shields from the Kofun period
- Several pieces of breastplate armor
- Several unearthed artifacts (magatama, necklaces, ring-pommel sabers)

=== Others ===
- Ornate red ō-yoroi
- Black lacquered kabuto, various helms
- Kokitsunemaru, an ōdachi forged by Sanjō Munechika

== Annual celebrations ==
- Japanese New Year (January 1)
- Genji-sai (January 3)
- Furufudatakiage-sai (January 15)
- Tama-no-o-sai (Night before Setsubun)
- Setsubun
- Kinen-sai (February 19)
- Kentōkōkōsha-ōmatsuri (First Sunday of each month)
- Shunki-ōmatsuri (April 15)
- Chōjukōsha-shunki-ōmatsuri (May 3)
- Denden Festival (June 30)
- Ōharae (June 30 and December 31)
- Sūkei-kai-ōmatsuri (First Sunday of each month)
- Boujisarae-shinji (October 1)
- Furumatsuri (October 15)
- Chōjukōsha-shūki-ōmatsuri (November 3)
- Chinkon-sai (November 22)
- Niiname-no-matsuri (November 23)
- Ohitaki-sai (December 8)
- The Emperor's Birthday (December 23)
- Hokura-matsuri (December 31)
- New Year's Eve (December 31)
- Tsukinami-no-matsuri (Every 1st and 15th day of the month)

== See also ==
- Seven-Branched Sword
- Kusanagi no tsurugi
- List of Jingū
- List of Shinto shrines
- Twenty-Two Shrines
- List of National Treasures of Japan (temples)
- List of National Treasures of Japan (archaeological materials)
- Modern system of ranked Shinto Shrines
