= Ichihara History Museum =

- 市原歴史博物館
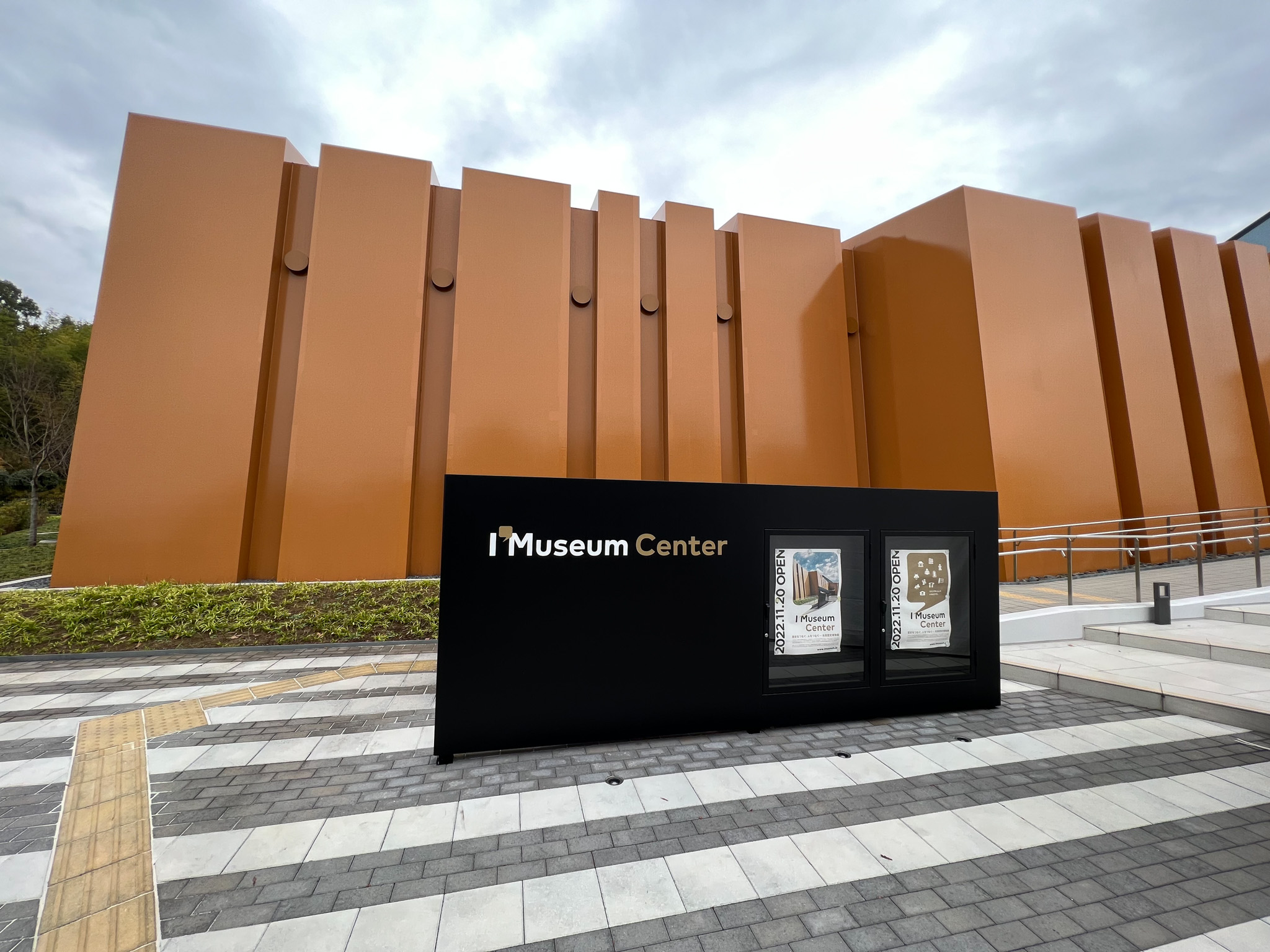
- Established: 20 November 2022
- Location: 1489 Nōman, Ichihara, Chiba Prefecture, Japan
- Coordinates: 35°30′17″N 140°07′45″E
- Website: Official website (ja)

The Ichihara History Museum (市原歴史博物館, Ichihara Rekishi Hakubutsukan), styled the I'Museum Center, opened in Ichihara, Chiba Prefecture, Japan, in 2022. The collection and displays document thirty thousand years of local history.

== See also ==
- National Museum of Japanese History
