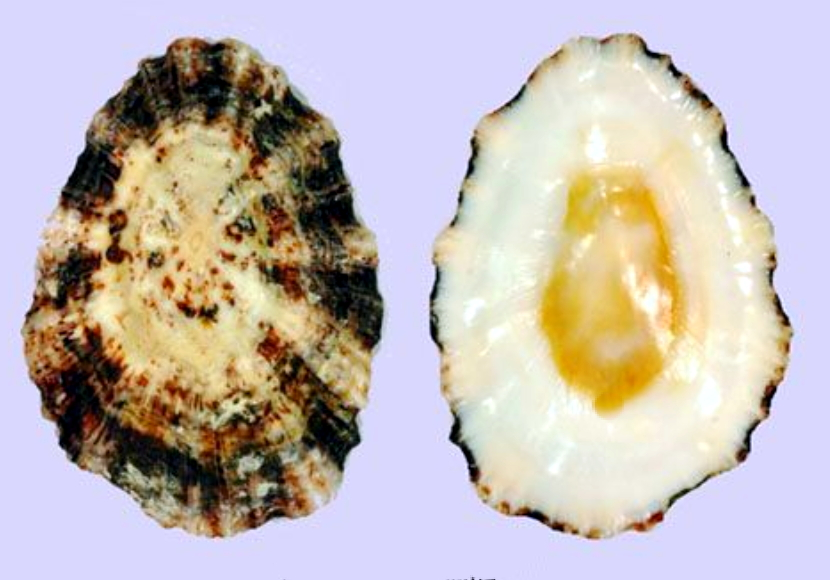
- Shell of Scutellastra optima (specimen at Natural History Museum Rotterdam)

Scientific classification
- Kingdom: Animalia
- Phylum: Mollusca
- Class: Gastropoda
- Subclass: Patellogastropoda
- Family: Patellidae
- Genus: Scutellastra
- Species: S. optima

Binomial name
- Scutellastra optima (Pilsbry, 1927)

Synonyms
- Patella stellaeformis optima Pilsbry, 1927 (basionym)

= Scutellastra optima =

Species of gastropod

Scutellastra optima is a species of true limpet, a marine gastropod mollusk in the family Patellidae.

== Description ==
The shell of the holotype measures 64 mm × 80 mm (2.5 in × 3.1 in).

(Original description) The shell is large, solid, and ovate in shape, with a distinctly depressed profile. Its sculpture consists of numerous low radial riblets, which are approximately equal in width to the intervals between them. These riblets are layered over a coarser underlying structure of about a dozen low, broad radial elevations.

The color is striking: the depressed spaces between the primary elevations are a dull, deep maroon, while the smaller intervals between the riblets on the raised portions exhibit a diluted shade of the same hue. The interior is white, featuring a central field clouded with cinnamon tones.

== Distribution ==
Scutellastra optima occurs in the northwestern Pacific. The holotype was obtained from Yakushima (Japan).
