= Tōdaijiyama Sword =

Coordinates: 34°37′17″N 135°50′15″E

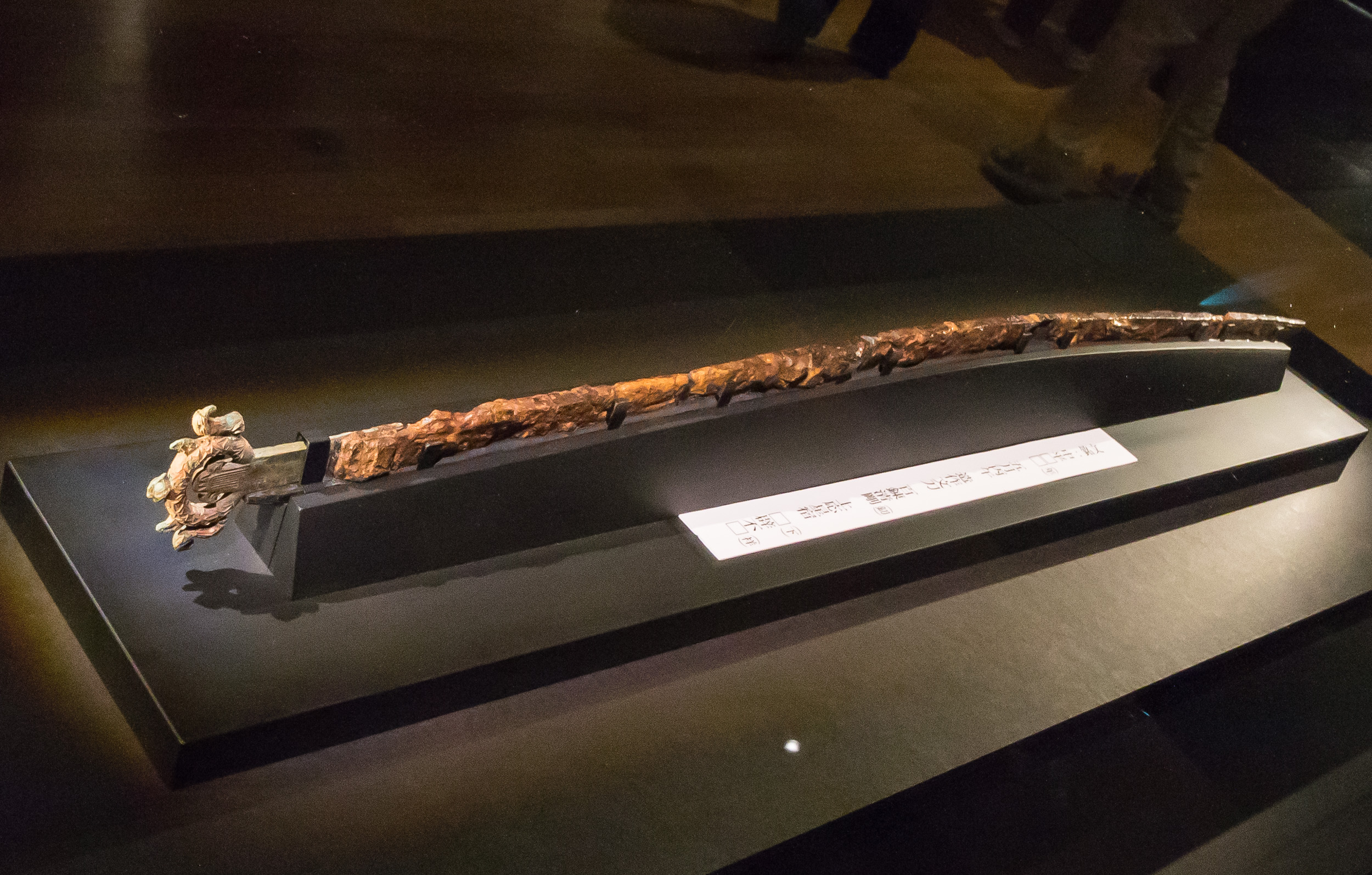
The sword on display in the Tokyo National Museum

Tōdaijiyama Sword, also known as Tōdaijiyama Kofun Iron Sword (東大寺山古墳鉄剣 Tōdaijiyama Kofun Tekken) in Japan is an ancient iron sword excavated in Tōdaijiyama kofun in Nara Prefecture, Japan. The sword was forged in China in the 2nd century and it's the oldest inscribed iron sword which has been excavated in Japan. Its inscription is an important source of the ancient diplomatic relations between China and Japan and its domestic politics.

== Inscription ==
The original Chinese text is;

中平□□ 五月丙午 造作支刀 百練清剛 上応星宿 □□□□

In English;

This ornate (?) sword was manufactured in an auspicious day of the fifth month in the ... Zhongping era. The metal from which it has been wrought has been refined many times; it is pure ... [The fortune of the one who wears it] will accord with the stars ...

== Interpretation ==
The Zhongping era is one of the Chinese traditional era name used by Emperor Ling of Han, corresponding between 184 and 189. In the Wajinden, a Chinese source describing Japan that is the part of the Records of the Three Kingdoms, the state of Wa had a large civil war in the period. It is assumed that the sword was bestowed by Emperor Ling on a king of Wa, though its detail is unknown. Then the sword was passed to a local ruling family in the region, who constructed the Tōdaijiyama Kofun in the late 4th century.

== See also ==
- Seven-Branched Sword
- Inariyama Sword
- Eta Funayama Sword
- Inaridai Sword
