= Civil War of Wa =

2nd-century war in Japan

The Civil War of Wa or Great Rebellion of Wa (倭国大乱, wakoku tairan) was a period of disturbances and warfare in ancient Japan (Wa) during the late Yayoi period (2nd century AD). It is the oldest war in Japan that has been documented in writing. Peace was restored around 180, when the shaman queen Himiko (Pimiko) of Yamatai-koku took control of the region.

== Chinese written sources ==
The war falls into Japan's protohistoric period. While the earliest Japanese national chronicles Kojiki and Nihon Shoki begin their accounts from the Age of the Gods, they are largely mythological in nature, and the account in the Nihon Shoki is reliable as a history only after about the late 6th century. The Chinese dynastic histories are an important written source for Japanese history before the 6th century and contain the only written account of this 2nd century war. Japanese history is recounted in sections on the "barbarian" neighbours of China at the end of each dynastic history in the form of a footnote rather than a major chapter. Consequently, information on the conflict is very limited. The earliest mention is in the passages referred to as the Wajinden of the Wei Zhi (ca. 297), which is part of the Records of the Three Kingdoms. Subsequent histories mentioning the conflict such as the Book of the Later Han (ca. 445), the Book of Liang (635), the Book of Sui (636) and the History of Northern Dynasties (mid 7th century) draw much from earlier works.

The following are the complete passages of the Wei Zhi, the Book of the Later Han, the Book of Sui and the History of Northern Dynasties dealing with the civil war:

The country formerly had a man as ruler. For some seventy or eighty years after that there were disturbances and warfare. Thereupon the people agreed upon a woman for their ruler. Her name was Pimiko.

— Wei Zhi, Accounts of the Eastern Barbarians

During the reigns of Huandi [147–168] and Lingdi [168–189] the country of Wa was in a state of great confusion, war and conflict raging on all sides. For a number of years, there was no ruler. Then a woman named Pimiko appeared. Remaining unmarried, she occupied herself with magic and sorcery and bewitched the populace. Thereupon they placed her on the throne.

— Book of the Later Han, Accounts of the Eastern Barbarians

In the reign of Huandi and Lingdi that country that was in great disorder, whose inhabitants had gradually gone to war against each other; so that, over the years, it came to be without a ruler. There was a woman there who was named Himiko; who, by the use of spirits, was able to confuse many people, so that her countrymen together made her their monarch.

— Book of Sui, Accounts of the Eastern Barbarians

In the reign of Lingdi that country that was in great disorder, whose inhabitants had gradually gone to war against each other; so that, over the years, it came to be without a ruler.

— History of Northern Dynasties

The Book of Liang speaks of "great disturbances" between 178 and 183.

== Archaeological evidence ==
There is no direct archaeological evidence for the civil war. However archaeological findings of stone or metal weapons and of defensive villages, particularly from the eastern Inland Sea to Kinki support the occurrence of battles during the Yayoi period.

== Discussion ==
Even though the basic course of events is the same in all of the histories, they differ in details and language. Due to the limited information provided in the sources various theories have been put forth by historians.

The Yayoi period is characterised by the introduction of rice cultivation and metallurgy from China or Korea, the development towards an agrarian society and the establishment of a social class structure. In the mid Yayoi period, community leaders managed to extend their authority over small regions the size of present-day districts; thanks partially to the control of imports and technology. These petty states established diplomatic contacts with China by the 1st century and the resulting increased influx of goods and technology or recognition of some local chieftains by China led to a further consolidation of political power.

=== Location ===
The war is thought to have occurred around Yamatai, the chiefdom which Himiko came to rule. However the exact location of Yamatai in Japan is not known and a major source of discussion in ancient Japanese history with most scholars favouring a location in either northern Kyushu or Kinai, (Note: Following the directions in the Wei Zhi, Yamatai would be situated in the Pacific. Kyushu and Kinai are obtained as possible candidates for Yamatai if either the travel distance or direction is modified in the old record.) the latter being close to the later Yamato Province, the former close to Yamato, Fukuoka, with which it might share its name.

=== Time ===
All of the historical sources agree that the conflict happened in the latter part of the 2nd century and ended in the 180s. (Note: Except for the Wei Zhi which only specifies a time interval.) However it is variously quoted as having lasted from between 5 and 80 years. The distinction of great (disturbances) in the Book of Liang suggests that earlier fightings that are included in the longer time frames of other sources were comparably minor and not worth mentioning for the authors of the Liang shu.

=== Cause ===
The cause of the war is not known. A smoldering political situation around the mid 2nd century or a power struggle between the Wa kingdoms have been named as possible origins.

=== Outcome ===
The number of chiefdoms known to the Chinese had been reduced from over a hundred before (Note: "Over a hundred" could mean uncountably many.) the war to around thirty at the time of Himiko. (Note: Thirty is the number of chiefdoms ruled by Himiko.) The rebellion also led to the formation of an early polity under Himiko's rule and as such is considered as a turning point between Yayoi and Kofun period. (Note: According to the Wei Zhi, Himiko was buried in a large mound tomb, which are characteristic for the Kofun period.)

== See also ==
- Five kings of Wa
- List of Japanese battles
- Tōdaijiyama Sword

== Bibliography ==
- Brown, Delmer M.; Hall, John Whitney (1993). The Cambridge History of Japan: Ancient Japan. Cambridge University Press. ISBN 978-0-521-22352-2.
- Dykstra, Yoshiko Kurata (2001). Sources of Japanese Tradition: From earliest times through the sixteenth century. Columbia University Press. ISBN 978-0-231-12139-2.
- Kidder, Jonathan Edward (March 2007). Himiko and Japan's elusive chiefdom of Yamatai: archaeology, history, and mythology. University of Hawaii Press. ISBN 978-0-8248-3035-9.
- Metevelis, Peter J. (2002). Myth in History. Mythological Essays. Vol. 2. iUniverse. ISBN 0-595-22950-6.
