= Keyhole tomb order =

Japanese societal system defined by tombs

The keyhole tomb order (前方後円墳体制, zenpōkōenfun taisei) was a social order in Japan that appeared in the early Kofun period and is visible as zenpōkōenfun became standardized in that period. The concept was proposed by archaeologist Hiroshi Tsude in 1991.

Other similar concepts were proposed by other archaeologists, such as Kazuo Hirose's keyhole tomb state (前方後円墳国家, zenpōkōenfun kokka) and Yoshirō Kondō's keyhole tomb system (前方後円墳秩序, zenpōkōenfun chitsujo). These various theories express similar concepts, but the different archaeologists focus on different aspects, and there is particular conflict in terms of the development of the state.

The keyhole tomb order is believed to represent a new level of social complexity and the advent of the Yamato Kingship.

== Overview ==
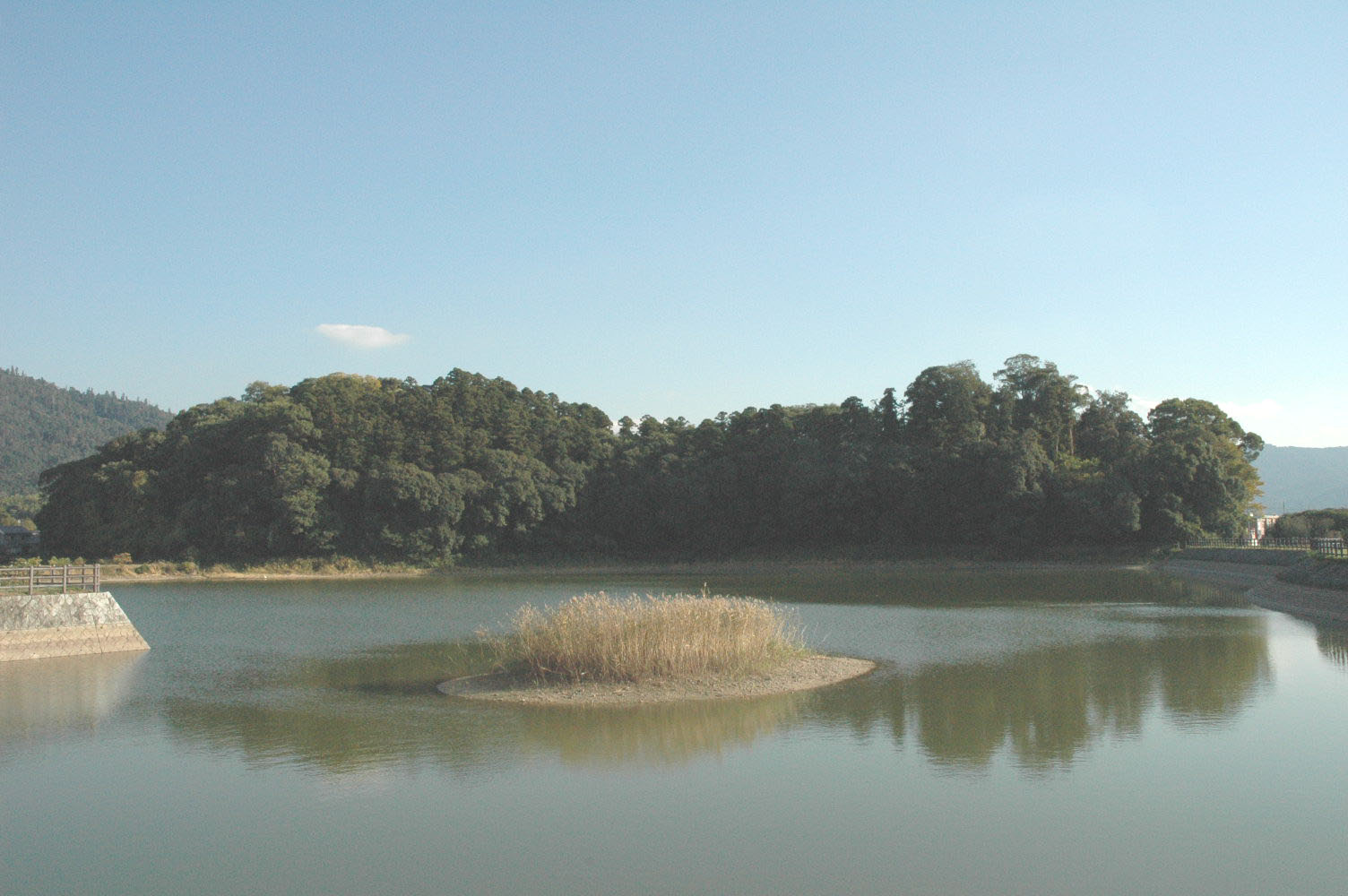
Hashihaka Kofun

Hiroshi Tsude argued that the beginning of the Kofun period was marked by the construction of the first standardized zenpōkōenfun (keyhole tomb), Hashihaka Kofun in Sakurai, Nara Prefecture. He also argued that the state had already developed by the time the Kofun period had begun, and that the unified social order that can be seen in the standardized system of burial customs should be referred to as the “keyhole tomb order (前方後円墳体制, zenpōkōenfun taisei)”. (Note: While archaeologist Satoshi Ohira supports Tsude’s theory insofar as it explains the establishment and continued expansion of the political system seen in the zenpōkōenfun, he disagrees that it is certain that you can infer a dominate-subordinate relationship between the chieftains throughout Japan from it. In fact, he argues one must consider the fact that the chieftains were required to use the same tomb type even if there was a hierarchical relationship within the scale of the tombs. He therefore claims the relationship was not one of ruler and ruled, and instead one of alliance.)

Kazuo Hirose argued that the zenpōkōenfun which spread across the Japanese archipelago were an expression of a network constituting a ruling class, in other words, a state, with the Yamato kingship at the center that should be referred to as the “keyhole tomb state (前方後円墳国家, zenpōkōenfun kokka)”, and he raised three aspects of the zenpōkōenfun that show this: their visible manifestation of royal authority, their unified shape, and the hierarchy seen in their scale. He defined this keyhole tomb state as an alliance of rulers with shared interests governed by the Yamato kingship that were similar in terms of territory, military authority, diplomatic authority, and ideology. He also claimed there is a hierarchy present seen in the difference between zenpōkōenfun and zenpō-kōhō-fun, with zenpō-kōhō-fun being the tombs of secondary, politically inferior members.

In terms of the historical significance, Yoshirō Kondō argues that the development of zenpōkōenfun shows how the more developed tribal leaders across Wakoku, primarily in central Kinai and Kibi, came together out of necessity due to both internal and external pressures, drawing them from the narrow worlds of their individual ancestors, which meant drawing them out of each region’s separate political and ritualistic sphere, linking these many tribal units across the archipelago politically and ritualistically in the zenpōkōenfun sphere. This formation of a “Wa world”, of a “keyhole tomb system”, brought a clear hierarchy to the tribal leaders of the different regions.

The concept of a keyhole tomb order was a significant addition to the study of ancient history and archaeology and has impacted essentially all researchers in those fields. The name as well, keyhole tomb order (前方後円墳体制, zenpōkōenfun taisei), has been widely adopted as suggested by Tsude.

According to archaeologist Sadayuki Watanabe, while the construction of tumuli varied by region and each region had its individual political authority and ritualistic sphere until the end of the Yayoi period, the zenpōkōenfun tumuli became much larger and the protruding section became standardized into a rectangular shape at the beginning of the Kofun period. Watanabe also focused on the fact that a clear hierarchy becomes apparent in the scale and shape of the mounds, claiming that the keyhole tomb order consists of a hierarchy of kofun in this order: zenpōkōenfun, zenpō-kōhō-fun, round, and square.

Another archaeologist, Hironobu Ishino, argues that, while zenpōkōenfun were used as the tombs for the ōkimi from the middle of the 3rd century to the end of the 6th century, one was then constructed for Iwai of Tsukushi Province, the leader of the rebellion against Emperor Keitai, meaning this keyhole tomb order was nothing more than a psychological bond between chiefs, and rituals had in fact changed significantly.

Archaeologist Kenji Fujita argues there are several issues with the argument that a unified system was established throughout all regions starting at the beginning of the approximately 350 years that large-scale zenpōkōenfun were constructed. One indicator of these issues is seen in the fact that the power structures necessary for constructing large-scale zenpōkōenfun had already been established throughout the various regions by the mid Kofun period, and the relationship between the leaders of central Kinki and other regions was nothing more than an alliance.

Others argue it is not possible to definitely confirm the existence of such a keyhole tomb order based on data collated from across Japan on the shape and size of imperial tombs, the number and distribution of tombs, the shift in construction over time, and the locations of the tombs that would be archetypes for zenpōkōenfun as well as the locations of the oldest zenpōkōenfun.

== See also ==
- Dolmen
- Grave mound
- Tumulus
- Zenpōkōenfun
