= Seven-Branched Sword =

Ceremonial sword in Japan

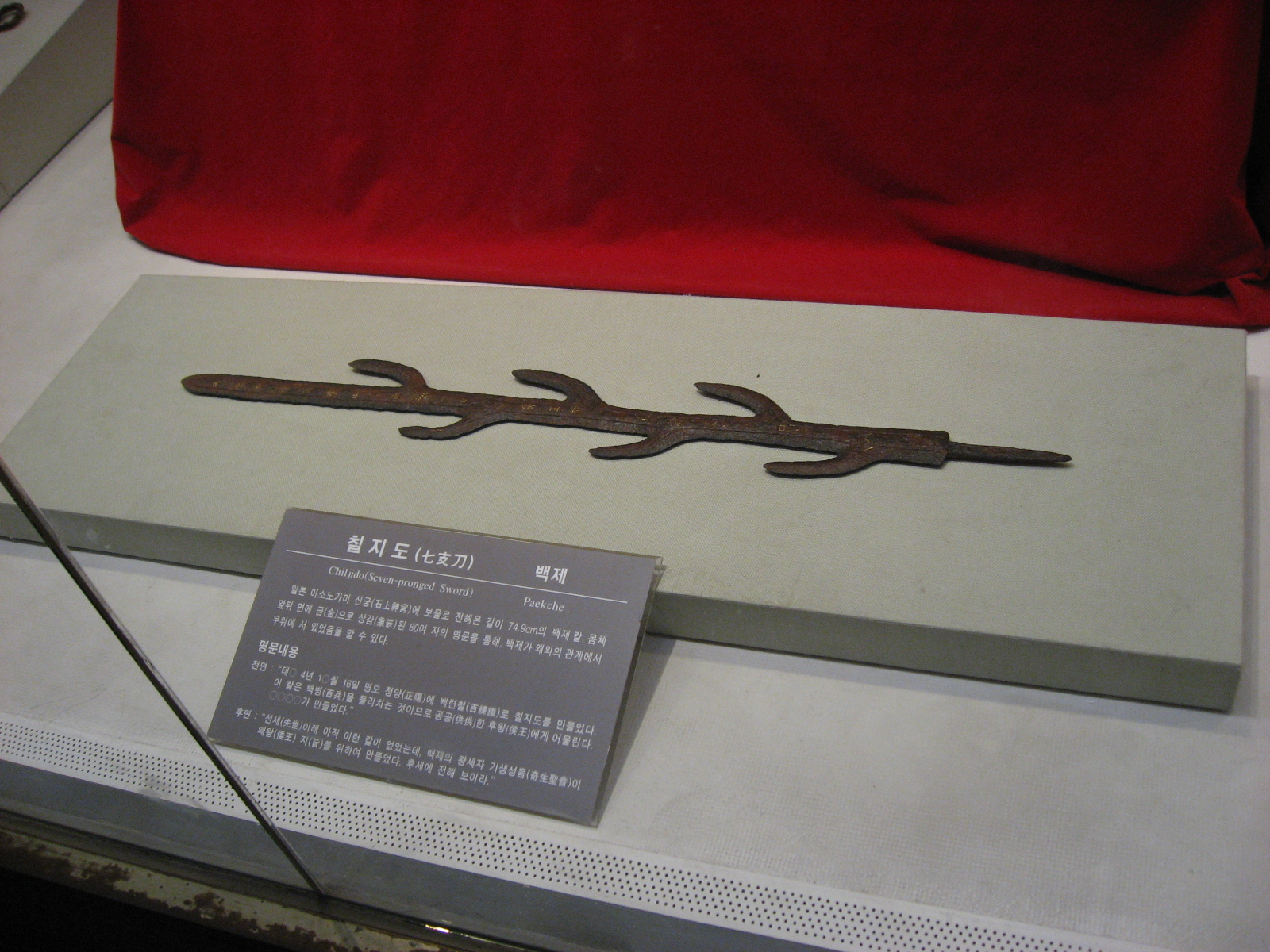
- Replica of the Seven-Branched Sword at the War Memorial in Seoul, South Korea.

Japanese name
- Kanji: 七支刀 or 七枝刀
Transcriptions
- Revised Hepburn: shichishitō or nanatsusaya no tachi

Korean name
- Hangul: 칠지도
- Hanja: 七支刀
Transcriptions
- Revised Romanization: chiljido
- McCune–Reischauer: ch'ilchido

The Seven-Branched Sword (Japanese: 七支刀, Hepburn: Shichishitō) is a ceremonial sword believed to be a gift from the crown prince of Paekche to a Yamato ruler. It is mentioned in the Nihon Shoki in the fifty-second year of the reign of the semi-mythical Empress Jingū. It is a 74.9 cm (29.5 in) long iron sword with six branch-like protrusions along the central blade. The original sword has been conserved since antiquity in the Isonokami Shrine in Nara Prefecture, Japan and is not on public display. An inscription on the side of the blade is an important source for understanding the relationships between kingdoms of the Korean peninsula and Japan in that period.

== Appearance ==
The blade of the sword is 65.5 cm and the tang is 9.4 cm long. There is no hole on the tang to fasten the sword with a hilt. The sword is broken at the top of the tang. In the past, the material was considered to be forged mild steel from the state of fracture surface, but the theory that it was cast became the mainstream through the latest research by Tsutomu Suzuki and experiments to create replicas by swordsmith Kunihira Kawachi. As the ‘branches’ appear to be quite delicate, and their functionality in melee combat doubtful, it is unlikely that the Seven-Branched Sword was used as a military weapon. Instead, it probably had a ceremonial function.

The sword has been stored in the Isonokami Shrine since ancient times. The inscription on the blade had been hidden by rust and was rediscovered in the 1870s by Masatomo Kan, a Shinto priest at the shrine. There is a two-sided inscription on the sword which is inlaid in gold. This sword appears to have been mentioned in the Nihon Shoki. Many scholars have engaged in study to interpret the vague inscription. Closeup pictures of the sword taken with X-ray were published in 1996. Recent CT scans have uncovered hidden writings, clearly showing the name Paekche.

== Origins ==
Analysis and archeology have suggested that the sword's origins lie in the kingdom of Paekche. The sword's peculiar design—with the tip of the blade counting as the "seventh" branch—is indicative of contemporary Korean tree-motifs. Other examples of this motif include the Paekche Crown and the Silla Crown. If the weapon had indeed been produced in Korea, it would have represented one of the prime artistic accomplishments of Paekche swordsmithery.

== Description in Nihon Shoki ==
The sword is mentioned in the biography of Empress Jingū, a legendary Japanese empress in the ancient era. The following is the original Classical Chinese text;

則獻七枝刀一口 七子鏡一面及種種重寶 仍啟曰 臣國以西有水 源出自谷那鐵山 其邈七日行之不及 當飲是水 便取是山鐵以永奉聖朝

In English;

:(52nd year, Autumn, 9th month 10th day. Kutyo and others came along with Chikuma Nagahiko) and presented a seven-branched sword and a seven-little-one-mirror, with various other objects of great value. They addressed the Empress, saying :-"West of thy servants' country there is a river-source which issues from Mount Cholsan in Gong-na. It is distant seven days' journey. It need not be approached, but one should drink of this water, and so having gotten the iron of this mountain, wait upon the sage Court for all ages."

== Inscription on the sword ==
The inscription states:

In original Chinese characters, inscribed vertically:

First Side: 泰■四年十(一)月十六日丙午正陽造百錬(銕)七支刀(出)辟百兵宜供供候王■■■■ (作 or 祥)
Second Side: 先世以來未有此刀百濟王世(子)奇生聖音故爲倭王旨造傳示後世

Characters in parentheses are ambiguous. Characters represented with black blocks are entirely unreadable.

In English:

First Side: "At noon on the sixteenth day of the eleventh [fifth] month, fourth year of Tai■, the sword was made of 100 times hardened steel. Using the sword repels 100 enemy soldiers [Appropriate for the polite duke lord] It is given [bestowed] to the duke lord. (Manufactured by or good fortune to...) [ ]"
Second Side: "Never before has there been such a blade. The crown prince of the king of Paekche, who lives under august sounds, had this sword made for King of Wa in the hope that it might be passed on to later generations."

== Interpretation of the inscription ==
2nd character on the first side, and when the sword was made: The first four characters 泰■四年 were traditionally decoded as "4th year of Taihe" which might be the era name of Emperor Fei of the Eastern Jin dynasty in China used around in the East Asian world, so Taihe 4 would correspond to year 369 CE. But that era name, Taihe, was never written as 泰和, but 太和, so with the ambiguous 2nd letter, this puts this traditional theory in dispute. Kim Sok Hyong, a North Korean scholar, proposed a theory that the first two characters instead refer to a local era name of the Paekche, but this theory has been challenged since no other archaeological discovery reveals the existence of unique era names assigned by the Paekche.

Furthermore, the creation of the sword being on the year 369 is solely based on interpreting the "泰■四年" inscription as "泰和四年" yet also leaving out what comes right after, the 十(一)月十六日丙午正陽 which means "At noon on the sixteenth day of the eleventh [fifth] month." Yet neither May 16 nor November 16 are days of 丙午 in the year 369, but instead May 27 or November 30. May 16 of the year 362, however, is 丙午. If interpreted as November 16, the year 408 has it as 丙午. Both 362 and 408 avoid the time period in which East Jin used 太和 for its era name, which was only from 366 to 371.

A Japanese research team in 1981 used X-rays to decipher the month, and concluded what was inscribed was 十(一) not 五, so a month greater than ten 十(一), so the theory of the inscription noting "fifth month" was ruled out.

Hong Sung-Hwa, a scholar at Korea University, argues that "十(一)月十六日(the sixteenth day of the eleventh month)" suggests the year 408, because for the 16th of November to be 丙午 in the sexagenary cycle, the year needs to be 408, which is also the 4th year of King Jun-ji's reign (腆支王) in Paekche. From this we can speculate that Paekche assigned era names autonomously (Goguryeo and Silla had their own era names). In 409, Wei's envoy visited Paekche, and King Jun-ji extended hospitality to him, so that sword was formed by 408.

Middle of the first side: The characters show the sword was made of steel and can repel an enemy. The subsequent characters are the most controversial part of the inscription. Kim notes that the sword uses the term "候王" translated as "enfeoffed lord," and thus claimed that the Wa king was subservient to the Paekche ruler as could be seen in 6th and 7th centuries, 3 times the Wa were conscripted for Baekje's wars against Silla (554, 562, 662) but never the reverse, even for its final battle in the Battle of Baekgang and its subsequent aftermath of building Korean-style fortresses in Japan. The majority of Japanese scholars do not agree with Kim's theory. They note that the meaning of the term "候王" varied in the different periods. After the Han dynasty, the term was used fluently and always just as an honorific.

End of the first side: Although four of the five last characters are undecodable, the last character indicates that the previous ones were either the name of the author or a prayer phrase such as "永年大吉祥"(Have Great Fortunes Forever"). In both cases, the phrase should generally indicate the end of inscription, and that the text on the second side is not a continuation. There is also a theory that the second side was written by different person, or at different time.

11th to 13th characters on the second side, and who presented the sword: the 11th to 13th characters may be decodable as "王世子"(Crown Prince), causing some scholars to regard that the sword was presented by the Crown Prince of Paekche, who eventually ascended as King Geungusu. However, as this segment includes ambiguous characters, it is not entirely clear who in Paekche presented the sword.

17th character on the second side: The character is regarded to be either "音"(Sound) or "晉"(Jin dynasty). The former interpretation indicates that the phrase "奇生聖音" has a Buddhist or Taoist nuance, and that the bestower has "lived under august (holy) sounds". Other scholars suggest that the phrase means "born coincidentally on august (holy) Jin dynasty".

19th to 23rd characters on the second side, and the presentee: The phrase, "爲倭王旨造", is translated in various ways through different interpretations of the 22nd character "旨".

- "旨" as a personal name: Regarding the letter as a personal name. Thus translates the phrase as following. "For Shi, the King of Wa, made (the sword)".
- "旨" as "order": Translates "for the order of King of Wa, made (the sword)".
- "旨" as "deliberately": Translates "for King of Wa, deliberately made (the sword)".
- "旨" as "first": Interpreting the letter as abbreviation of "嘗". Translates "for the first time, made (the sword) for King of Wa".

Treating it as a personal name leads to the Paekche-centric idea that Baekje's presenter boldly writes the name of the King of Wa, and thus regards him lower. Treating it as "order" leads to the Japan-centric idea that Paekche presented the sword because the King of Wa ordered him to do so. Therefore, the interpretation of this character tends to be controversial. Ueda Masaaki (quoted by Saeki, 1977) is rather an exception among Japanese historians because he “has maintained that the Seven-branched sword was ‘bestowed’ on the Wa ruler by the king of Paekche.” Ueda “based his interpretation on the argument that the term ‘候王 koo’ [huwang] appearing in the inscription denotes a ruler in vassalage to the Paekche king and that the inscription is written in the commanding tone of a superior addressing an inferior, exemplified by the sentence reading ‘Hand down [this sword] to [your] posterity." However, Saeki (1977) argues that one can not interpret the inscription to mean either “to bestow” the sword on the King in vassalage or “to respectfully present” to the emperor, as many Japanese scholars have maintained since the Meiji period. Saeki seems to be inclined to take Hirano's argument that the inscription simply indicates the fact there was a respectful and sincere relationship between the rulers of Baekche and Wa.

Yet another theory proposed by Kōsaku Hamada of Kyushu University suggests that the original seven-branched sword was created by Eastern Jin in 369 (泰和四年 4th year of Taihe) for a vassal lord with the first inscription. In 372, King Geunchogo of Paekche sent an embassy to arrive at the court of Eastern Jin in 372, and then a Jin envoy was sent to the Paekche court, granting the title of “General Stabilizing the East and Governor of Le-lang" (鎭東將軍). He hypothesizes the sword was given to the king around this time. The king of Paekche ordered the creation of a replica of the sword with the second inscription and sent it to Wa for an alliance as peers under Eastern Jin. Thus no vassalage relationships are involved between Paekche and Wa. He claims that this explains the commanding tone of the first inscription and the respect paid to Jin (owes his life to august Jin) in the second inscription.

However, the major flaw in this suggestion, is hypothesizing up an "original sword" without any evidence to its existence. Also, Eastern Jin never had a "泰和" era name, and used "太和" instead. And it is unclear what the 2nd letter of the inscription is, for it was written 泰■四年, or whether it is an era name at all. And also does not line up with dates.

And if this sword is bestowed from Jin, it is strange to only mention Paekche as the one who created the sword, with no mention of (East) Jin by name. It would also be strange to mention the sword was made with iron from Baekje's Gong-na. Even if 泰和四年 is the correct theory, using Chinese era names as standard was a common practice around East Asia at this time.

Regardless, the sword proves there were very close ties between the Paekche and the Wa, and the opening of friendly relations between two countries probably dates to the year 372.

In connection with the date of fabrication, Hong Sung-Hwa, a scholar of Korea University, says in 396–409, Paekche came under attack by Goguryeo, so Paekche needed to form an alliance with the Wa (Japan); King Jun-ji of Paekche gave King of Wa the sword.

== In popular media ==
- In SaGa Frontier, the final boss of Blue's story is depicted as wielding a Seven Branched Sword in its humanoid form.
- In Tenchu: Stealth Assassins, the final villain Lord Mei-Oh wields the Shichishito, a seven-branched sword.
- It appears in several games in the Final Fantasy series, known as Nanatsuyanotachi.
- In Samurai Warriors, it is a type of weapon wielded by Kenshin Uesugi.
- In Sekiro: Shadows Die Twice, it is the sword wielded by the Divine Dragon.
- In the Monster Hunter series, it is a Greatsword crafted from the electric monster Kirin, King Thundersword.
- Phoenix Wright: Ace Attorney – Trials and Tribulations features a sword named Shichishito, which is presented as evidence in a murder case.
- Megami Tensei artist Kazuma Kaneko has depicted the god Susano-o wielding the seven-branched sword in multiple games.
- In Persona 5, while not the same shape, Yusuke Kitagawa's Persona, Kamu Susano-o, wields a sword of the same name.
- It appears in Danganronpa 2: Goodbye Despair, as a present called Seven Sword.
- In the Super Adventure Box Tribulation Mode of Guild Wars 2, it is wielded by the Tribulation Cloud. A version done in the game's visual style was also added as a skin in the game's microtransaction store.
- In Dark Cloud and its sequel Dark Chronicle, it is a weapon wielded by Toan in Dark Cloud and by Monica Raybrandt in Dark Chronicle.
- In Magia Record, it is wielded by Shizuka Tokime, one of the major magical girls in Arc 2 of the main story.
- In Silent Hill f, it is one of the weapons wielded by Tsukumogami.
- In Disgaea: Hour of Darkness, the Rank 35 Sword is named the "Shichishi-Tou".

== See also ==
- History of Japan
- History of Korea
- Amenohiboko
- Gwanggaeto Stele
- Japanese swords
- Korean swords
- List of National Treasures of Japan (archaeological materials)
