= 1070s =

Decade

The 1070s was a decade of the Julian Calendar which began on January 1, 1070, and ended on December 31, 1079.

== Events ==
=== 1070 ===
- Spring – King Sweyn II of Denmark joins rebels in England led by Hereward the Wake and captures the Isle of Ely in The Fens of East Anglia. On June 1 Hereward sacks Peterborough Abbey with support from Sweyn's Danes.
- Harrying of the North: William the Conqueror quells rebellions in the north of his Kingdom of England following the invasion by Sweyn II. Widespread famine follows the devastation wrought.
- April 11 – Stigand is deposed as Archbishop of Canterbury in England by papal legates and imprisoned.
- May 1 – After 353 years of being exiled to Lugo due to the Muslim occupation of the city of Braga, the Diocese of Braga is restored by order of Ferdinand I of León under Archbishop Pedro of Braga thanks to the advancing Christian forces during the Reconquista.
- June – Denmark signs a treaty with England; Sweyn II and his forces leave the country.
- August 15 – The Pavian-born Benedictine Lanfranc is appointed as the new Archbishop of Canterbury in England.
- An invasion of England by Malcolm III of Scotland is repelled.
- Hugh d'Avranches, 1st Earl of Chester, the first Marcher Lord, invades Wales, capturing parts of Gwynedd.
- A successful Byzantine counter-attack drives the Seljuq Turks across the Euphrates.
- Bergen is founded by King Olaf III of Norway; it will function as the main city and capital of Norway, until it is replaced by Oslo in 1314.
- Chinese Chancellor Wang Anshi starts the Xining Reforms (which last until 1085).
- Jews from Rouen in Normandy settle in England at the invitation of King William I.
- The Temple of Literature, Hanoi, is established in Hanoi, capital of Vietnam.
- Uyghur poet Yusuf Khass Hajib of Balasagun, in the Kara-Khanid Khanate, completes the Kutadgu Bilig ("The Wisdom Which Brings Good Fortune"), and presents it to the prince of Kashgar.
- Song dynasty Chinese astronomer, engineer and statesman Su Song completes the compilation of the Ben Cao Tu Jing, a pharmaceutical treatise with related subjects of botany, zoology, mineralogy and metallurgy.
- The rebuilding of Canterbury Cathedral in England following a fire begins.
- The rebuilding of York Minster in England begins.
- Construction of Richmond Castle in North Yorkshire, England, by Alan Rufus begins.
- Approximate date – Halsten Stenkilsson is deposed as king of Sweden, with Håkan the Red becoming king in Götaland, and Anund Gårdske being chosen as king of Svealand.

=== 1071 ===
==== By place ====
====== Byzantine Empire ======
- August 26 – Battle of Manzikert: The Byzantine army (35,000 men) under Emperor Romanos IV meets the Seljuk Turk forces of Sultan Alp Arslan near the town of Manzikert. Although the armies are initially evenly matched, as the Byzantines advance, the Seljuk Turks withdraw before them, launching hit-and-run attacks on the Byzantine flanks. While attempting to withdraw, the Byzantine army falls apart, either through treachery or confusion; the battle ends in a decisive defeat for the Byzantine Empire. Romanos is captured (though released by Alp Arslan within a week) and much of the elite Varangian Guard is destroyed; this will prove catastrophic for the Byzantine Empire.
- October 24 – Romanos IV is deposed by John Doukas (Caesar) and his political advisor Michael Psellos after his return to Constantinople. Michael VII Doukas is crowned co-emperor and his mother Eudokia is forced to retire to a monastery.

====== Europe ======
- February 22 – Battle of Cassel: Robert I ("the Frisian") defeats his sister-in-law Richilde (widow of Baldwin VI) and her nephew Arnulf III, in a succession struggle for the County of Flanders. Robert is appointed count by King Philip I of France.
- April 15 – Siege of Bari: The capital of Bari, the last Byzantine-controlled city in the Catepanate of Italy, is captured by Italo-Norman forces under Duke Robert Guiscard after a 32-month siege.

====== England ======
- The English rebels under Hereward the Wake and Morcar, Saxon former earl of Northumbria, are forced to retreat to their stronghold on the Isle of Ely in The Fens. They make a desperate stand against the Norman forces led by King William the Conqueror, but are defeated.
- Edwin, earl of Mercia, rebels against William I, but is betrayed and killed. His castle and lands at Dudley (located in the West Midlands) are given to William's Norman subjects.

====== Africa ======
- May – Zaynab an-Nafzawiyyah marries Yusuf ibn Tashfin, leader of the Almoravids, and becomes his queen and co-regent.

=== 1072 ===
==== By place ====
====== Byzantine Empire ======
- June 29 – Romanos IV Diogenes, deposed ruler of the Byzantine Empire, is blinded and sent into exile to the island of Proti (in the Sea of Marmara) at the Monastery of Transfiguration. A few days before his death, he receives a letter from Michael Psellos (his political advisor), congratulating him on the loss of his eyes.

====== Europe ======
- January 10 – The Normans under Robert Guiscard and his brother Roger I ("Boso") conquer Palermo (after a one year siege). Roger receives the keys of the city, and Robert invests him with the title of Count of Sicily. The Emirate of Sicily rules only the southern part of the island, with Syracuse as the capital (until 1091).
- January – Battle of Golpejera: King Sancho II ("the Strong") defeats the Castilian forces of his brother Alfonso VI ("the Brave") near Carrión de los Condes. Alfonso is captured, but released into exile, where he seeks refuge in the Taifa of Toledo (under the protection of his vassal, Emir Al-Mamun).
- October 7 – Alfonso VI becomes king of León and Castile, following the assassination of Sancho II. He is bestowed with the title of "Emperor of Spain", and is forced by El Cid (Rodrigo Diaz de Vivar), the standard-bearer of Sancho, to take an oath denying any involvement in his brother's death.

====== Britain ======
- May 27 – The Accord of Winchester establishes the primacy of the Archbishop of Canterbury over the Archbishop of York, in the Church of England.
- William the Conqueror, King of England, invades Scotland and receives the submission of King Malcolm III. He agrees to sign the Treaty of Abernethy.

====== Seljuk Empire ======
- December 15 – Sultan Alp Arslan ("Heroic Lion") dies after a 9-year reign, during his campaign in Transoxiana. He is succeeded by his 17-year-old son Malik-Shah I, who is declared new ruler of the Seljuk Empire. Qavurt, a brother of Alp Arslan, claims the Seljuk throne for himself and occupies the capital of Isfahan.

====== China ======
- Shen Kuo, Chinese polymathic scientist and statesman, is appointed as the head official for the Bureau of Astronomy – where he begins his work with the colleague Wei Pu on accurately plotting the orbital paths of the stars, planets, and moon three times a night for a continuum of five years.
- Fall – Shen Kuo is sent to supervise Wang Anshi's program of surveying the buildup of silt deposits in the Grand Canal, outside the capital city of Kaifeng. Using an original technique, Shen successfully dredges the canal and demonstrates the formidable value of the silt gathered as a fertilizer.

==== By topic ====
====== Literature ======
- Dīwān Lughāt al-Turk, an informative book written by Mahmud al-Kashgari about the Turks, is presented to the ruler of the Kara-Khanid Khanate.

=== 1073 ===
==== By place ====
====== Byzantine Empire ======
- Spring – Emperor Michael VII Doukas sends a Byzantine army to deal with Seljuk raiding in Cappadocia, supported with a mixed force of Norman and French mercenary heavy cavalry under Roussel de Bailleul. Roussel re-conquers some territory in Galatia and declares it an independent Norman state. Michael, enraged, sends another army led by his uncle, Caesar John Doukas and the veteran General Nikephoros Botaneiates to deal with the rising of the Norman threat in Asia minor. But the Byzantines are defeated and John is captured. Roussel marches with a force (3,000 men) across Bithynia to the Bosporus and sacks Chrysopolis, near Constantinople.

====== Europe ======
- May 25 – King Sancho IV of Navarre and Ahmad al-Muqtadir, Muslim ruler of the Taifa of Zaragoza, conclude an alliance by treaty.
- October 14 – The Judicate of Arborea (one of the four independent kingdoms in Sardinia) is recognised by Pope Gregory VII.
- Ebles II of Roucy leads a French army in Spain, to support King Sancho V of Aragon in his struggle against his Muslim neighbors.
- Sviatoslav II and Vsevolod I unite the Kievan forces and expel their brother Iziaslav I. Sviatoslav II becomes Grand Prince of Kyiv.

====== Britain ======
- Edgar Ætheling, last male member of the House of Wessex, joins forces with Kings Malcolm III of Scotland and Philip I of France in an attempt to take the English throne.

====== Asia ======
- Wang Anshi, Chinese chief chancellor of the Song dynasty, creates a new bureau of the central government (called the Directorate of Weapons), which supervises the manufacture of military armaments and ensures quality control.
- June 15 – Emperor Emperor Go-Sanjō dies after a 5-year reign and is succeeded by his 19-year-old son Shirakawa as the 72nd emperor of Japan.

==== By topic ====
====== Religion ======
- Pope Alexander II dies after a 11½-year pontificate at Rome. He is succeeded by Gregory VII as the 157th pope of the Catholic Church.
- Rabbi Yitchaki Alfassi finishes writing the Rif, an important work of Jewish law.
- John IX bar Shushan ends his term as Syriac Orthodox Patriarch of Antioch.

=== 1074 ===
==== By place ====
====== Byzantine Empire ======
- Spring – Norman mercenaries, led by Roussel de Bailleul, proclaim John Doukas emperor of the Byzantine Empire. His nephew, Emperor Michael VII Doukas, forms an alliance with Seljuk chieftain Suleiman ibn Qutulmish, who is raiding in the eastern regions of Anatolia. The Seljuk Turks ambush the Norman forces; Roussel and John are defeated and captured; but a ransom, raised by Roussel's wife, allows him to return to Amaseia.

====== Europe ======
- February 2 – Treaty of Gerstungen: Henry IV, Holy Roman Emperor, is forced to restore the peace with Duke Otto of Nordheim (one of the Saxon leaders of the Saxon Rebellion). He signs a treaty in Gerstungen Castle, on the River Werra in Thuringia (modern Germany).
- February 7 – Battle of Montesarchio: Prince Pandulf IV, co-ruler of Benevento, is killed while fighting the Normans in southern Italy.
- March 14 – Battle of Mogyoród: King Solomon is defeated by his cousins, Duke Géza I and Ladislaus I. He is dethroned and Géza becomes the new ruler of Hungary.
- October 21 – The Belgium beer brand Affligem is founded.

====== Africa ======
- Spring – Badr al-Jamali becomes Chief Wazir (Grand Vizier) and effectively military dictator of the Fatimid Caliphate under Caliph Al-Mustansir Billah in Egypt.

====== China ======
- Emperor Shenzong of Song establishes a Marine Office and a Goods Control Bureau north-west of Shanghai, allowing for the loading and unloading of freight.

==== By topic ====
====== Religion ======
- Pope Gregory VII temporarily excommunicates the Norman nobleman Robert Guiscard.

=== 1075 ===
==== By place ====
====== Africa ======
- The Kingdom of Mapungubwe is established, in modern-day South Africa.

====== Byzantine Empire ======
- The future Emperor Alexios Komnenos captures the Norman rebel Roussel de Bailleul in Amaseia. Roussel had established a principality in eastern Anatolia in 1073 after rebelling against Emperor Michael VII Doukas, basing his power on his western mercenaries and local support in exchange for protection against invading Turkmen.

====== Europe ======
- June 9 – First Battle of Langensalza: Emperor Henry IV defeats the Saxon nobles on the River Unstrut near Langensalza in Thuringia (modern Germany). He subjugates Saxony, and immediately tries to reassert his rights as the sovereign of northern Italy.
- Anund Gårdske is deposed as king of Svealand (also called Sweden proper). King Håkan the Red of Götaland proclaims himself ruler of all Sweden.

====== England ======
- Revolt of the Earls: The Earls Ralph de Gael, Roger de Breteuil and Waltheof, begin a revolt against King William I (the Conqueror) in the last serious act of resistance to the Norman Conquest.
- Roger de Breteuil is brought before the Great Council. He is deprived of his lands and sentenced to perpetual imprisonment. Ralph de Gael and Waltheof are charged as co-conspirators.
- August 25 – Council of London: Archbishop Lanfranc instigates the movement of English bishoprics. One of these is the bishopric of Sherborne and Wilton which is moved to Old Sarum.

====== Asia ======
- Summer – Shen Kuo, Chinese polymath scientist and statesman, solves a border dispute with the Liao dynasty by dredging up old diplomatic records. He refutes Emperor Dao Zong's bluffs point for point during a meeting at Mt. Yongan (near modern-day Pingquan), reestablishing the rightful borders of the Song dynasty.
- Vietnamese forces under General Lý Thường Kiệt defend Vietnam against a Chinese invasion.
- The Liao dynasty version of the Buddhist Tripiṭaka is completed (approximate date).

==== By topic ====
====== Religion ======
- February – Pope Gregory VII holds a council in the Lateran Palace at Rome. He publishes a decree against laymen investiture (an act which will later cause the Investiture Controversy).
- April – The Dictatus papae (a compilation of 27 statements of powers) are included in the registry of Gregory VII, in which he asserts papal authority over earthly as well as spiritual rulers.
- December 8 – Gregory VII writes a letter of reprimand to Henry IV. He accuses him of breaching his word and continued support of excommunicated councilors.
- December 25 – Gregory VII is kidnapped in the church during Christmas night in Rome and briefly imprisoned by the Roman nobleman Cencio I Frangipane.

=== 1076 ===
==== By place ====
====== Europe ======
- January 24 – Synod of Worms: Emperor Henry IV, Holy Roman Emperor, holds a synod in Worms (modern Germany). The assembly declares Pope Gregory VII deposed, and the bishops abandon their allegiance to him.
- February 22 – Gregory VII pronounces a sentence of excommunication against Henry IV at Rome. He is excluded from the Catholic Church, and all the bishops named by Henry are excommunicated.
- Summer – Dirk V, count of Holland, re-conquers West Frisia (modern Netherlands) from the Archdiocese of Utrecht. He besieges Bishop Conrad at the castle of IJsselmonde, taking him prisoner.
- October 8 – Demetrius Zvonimir is crowned as king of Croatia in Solin (near Split), in the Basilica of Saint Peter and Moses (known later as the Hollow Church) by a representative of Gregory VII.
- December 13 – Norman conquest of southern Italy: Italo-Norman forces under Robert Guiscard de Hauteville and Richard I of Capua, conquer the fortress city of Salerno after a short siege.
- December 26 – Bolesław II the Bold (or "the Generous") is crowned as King of Poland by Archbishop Bogumił in Gniezno Cathedral. Bolesław supports Gregory VII in his conflict against Henry IV.

====== England ======
- May 31 – Waltheof, Earl of Northumbria, a participant in the Revolt of the Earls against King William the Conqueror, is beheaded near Winchester.
- November 1 – A frost begins that lasts until April 1077.
- Approximate date – The Trial of Penenden Heath is held, with an important ruling regarding land rights subsequent to the Norman Conquest.

====== Africa ======
- Approximate date – Koumbi Saleh, an important mercantile and political center of the Ghana Empire (modern Mauritania), is besieged by the Almoravids.

====== Asia ======
- Vikramaditya VI deposes his older brother Someshvara II to become king of the Western Chalukya Empire (modern India).

==== By topic ====
====== Literature ======
- Anselm of Aosta, an Italian Benedictine abbot, completes his Monologion at the request of his fellow monks.

====== Religion ======
- Demetrius Zvonimir donates the Benedictine monastery of St. Gregory in Vrana to Gregory VII.

=== 1077 ===
==== By place ====
====== Byzantine Empire ======
- Fall – Nikephoros Bryennios the Elder, governor (doux) of the Theme of Dyrrhachium in the western Balkans, and Nikephoros Botaneiates, a general (strategos) of the Theme of Anatolics (modern Turkey), are proclaimed emperors by their troops. Emperor Michael VII Doukas offers Bryennios the title of caesar (co-emperor) if he submits to his rule, but Bryennios refuses. He sets out from Dyrrhachium, and marches towards Constantinople.

====== Europe ======
- January 25 – Walk to Canossa: Emperor Henry IV travels to the Castle of Canossa near Reggio Emilia (Northern Italy), to visit Pope Gregory VII. He waits (with his wife Bertha of Savoy and son Conrad) at the gates for three days, for absolution of his excommunication. Gregory lifts the sentence, imposing on Henry a vow to comply with certain conditions (see Investiture Controversy).
- King Alfonso VI ("the Brave") reaches an agreement with his cousin Sancho Ramírez, who is elected as king of Navarre. Alfonso annexes the territories of Álava, part of Gipuzkoa and La Bureba, he is crowned and adopts the title of Imperator totius Hispaniae ("Emperor of all Spain").
- March 14 – German nobles opposing king Henry IV elected an antiking, Rudolf of Rheinfelden, despite king Henry having been absolved.
- April 3 – Henry IV grants the County of Friuli (with ducal status) to Sigaerd of Beilstein, patriarch of Aquileia. He creates the first Parliament, representing the communes as well the nobility and clergy.
- Hugh I, duke of Burgundy, supports Sancho Ramírez (or Sancho V) in his conquest of the Castle of Muñones from Emir Ahmad al-Muqtadir, who rules the Taifa of Zaragoza.
- King Mihailo I is given the title "King of the Slavs" by Gregory VII. He becomes the first recognized ruler of the kingdom of Duklja (modern Montenegro).

====== England ======
- August 14 – A fire destroys much of London.
- Robert Curthose instigates his first insurrection against his father, King William the Conqueror in the Normandy.
- The first recorded trial by combat is held between Wulfstan and Walter.

====== Seljuk Empire ======
- Suleiman ibn Qutulmish, a cousin of late Sultan Alp Arslan, consolidates his leadership over the Oghuz Turks and founds the Sultanate of Rum (modern Turkey).
- Anushtegin Gharchai becomes governor (shihna) of Khwarezm and a vassal of the Seljuk Empire (until 1097).

====== Africa ======
- The Almoravids complete the conquest of the Ghana Empire, and reach Spain (approximate date).

==== By topic ====
====== Arts ======
- The Bayeux Tapestry (embroidery) is completed, probably in England, possibly to unveil at the dedication of Bayeux Cathedral this year.

====== Religion ======
- September 1 – Pope Gregory VII appoints Landulf as bishop of Pisa. He makes him permanent legate of the Holy See in Corsica.
- Paul of Caen is installed as abbot of St. Albans in England. He commences the building of St. Albans Abbey Church.
- Pope Christodolos ends his reign as leader of the Coptic Orthodox Church of Alexandria (modern Egypt).

=== 1078 ===
==== By place ====
====== Byzantine Empire ======
- Spring – Nikephoros Botaneiates, a Byzantine general (strategos) of the Theme of the Anatolics, revolts against Emperor Michael VII Doukas. With the support of the Seljuk Turks who provide him with troops, Nikephoros marches upon Nicaea (modern Turkey). He defeats the imperial army and proclaims himself emperor.
- March 24 – Nikephoros Botaneiates enters Constantinople in triumph and is crowned by Patriarch Cosmas I as emperor Nikephoros III of the Byzantine Empire. Michael VII resigns his throne after a 7-year reign and retires into the Monastery of Stoudios.
- Battle of Kalavrye: The imperial forces of General Alexios Komnenos are victorious over the rebellious army (12,000 men) under Nikephoros Bryennios the Elder, governor (doux) of the Theme of Dyrrhachium. Bryennios is captured and later blinded.
- Philaretos Brachamios abandons his claim to the Byzantine throne, on being appointed governor of Antioch, a foundation of the later Armenian Kingdom of Cilicia.

====== Europe ======
- August 7 – Battle of Mellrichstadt: Emperor Henry IV defeats the German anti-king Rudolf of Rheinfelden, duke of Swabia, near Mellrichstadt (modern Germany).
- October 3 – Grand Prince Iziaslav I dies, and is succeeded by Vsevolod I, who unites the principalities – Kyiv, Chernigov and Pereyaslavl – in Kievan Rus'.

====== England ======
- Approximate date – The White Tower of the Tower of London is begun, under the direction of Gundulf (or Gundulph), bishop of Rochester.

====== Africa ======
- The Almoravid emir, Yusuf ibn Tashfin, besieges Ceuta. Since the city can receive help from the sea, the siege will last until 1083.

====== China ======
- By this year, the iron industry in the Song dynasty is producing a total weight of 127,000,000 kg (125,000 t) of iron product per year.

==== By topic ====
====== Religion ======
- July 11 – The Romanesque tympanum of Santiago de Compostela Cathedral in Galicia (Spain) is constructed.
- Anselm is elected abbot of Bec Abbey, in Normandy.
- A church council in Poitiers deposes Bishop Sylvester of Rennes who had bought his office in 1076. This leads also to the flight of Robert of Arbrissel to Paris where he begins his studies.

=== 1079 ===
==== By place ====
====== Europe ======
- April 11 – Stanislaus of Szczepanów, bishop of Kraków, is executed on orders by King Bolesław II the Generous. The way in which his sentence is carried out causes a revolt among the Polish nobles. Bolesław is forced to flee, to take refuge at the court of King Ladislaus I of Hungary. He is succeeded by his brother Władysław I, as ruler of Poland.
- Battle of Cabra: Moorish forces, aided by Castilian knights under El Cid (Rodrigo Diaz), defeat and rout the invading army of Emir Abdallah ibn Buluggin of Granada, near the town of Cabra (modern Spain).
- Emperor Henry IV appoints Frederick I as duke of Swabia at Hohenstaufen Castle. Henry's 7-year-old daughter Agnes of Waiblingen is betrothed to Frederick who founds the Hohenstaufen Dynasty.
- Upon the death of Håkan the Red, Halsten Stenkilsson returns as king of Sweden, jointly with his brother Inge the Elder (approximate date).

====== England ======
- King William the Conqueror establishes the New Forest in Southern England. He proclaims it as a royal forest, using it for hunting, mainly of deer.

====== Seljuk Empire ======
- The Seljuk Turks under Sultan Suleiman ibn Qutulmish reach and occupy the western coast of Asia Minor, an area known since the Archaic Period (c. 800–c. 500 BC) as Ionia (modern Turkey).

==== By topic ====
====== Astronomy ======
- Omar Khayyam, Persian mathematician and astronomer, calculates a 33 year calendar consisting of 25 ordinary years that include 365 days, and 8 leap years that include 366 days, the most accurate calculation of his time. Khayyam, in his Treatise on Demonstrations of Problems in Algebra, produces a complete classification of cubic equations and their geometric solutions (approximate date).

====== Religion ======
- Constance, queen of Castile and León, founds a monastery in Burgos (approximate date).

== Significant people ==
- Omar Khayyam
- William the Conqueror
- Al-Qa'im
- Alp Arslan Seljuk sultan
- Malik-Shah I Seljuk sultan

== Births ==
1070

- Allucio of Campugliano, Italian diplomat (d. 1134)
- Bertrade de Montfort, queen of France (d. 1117)
- Buthaina bint al-Mu'tamid ibn Abbad, Al-Andalus poet
- Coloman (the Learned), king of Hungary (d. 1116)
- Eupraxia of Kiev, Holy Roman Empress (d. 1109)
- Gertrude of Flanders, duchess of Lorraine (d. 1117)
- Giso IV, count of Gudensberg (approximate date)
- Gualfardo of Verona, Italian trader and hermit (d. 1127)
- Guerric of Igny, French abbot (approximate date)
- Henry I (the Elder), German nobleman (d. 1103)
- Hugues de Payens, French knight (approximate date)
- John Komnenos, Byzantine aristocrat and official
- Lothair Udo III, margrave of the Nordmark (d. 1106)
- Meinhard I, German nobleman (approximate date)
- Otto (the Rich), German nobleman (approximate date)
- Ralph of Pont-Echanfray, Norman knight (d. 1120)
- Ramiro Sánchez, Spanish nobleman (approximate date)
- Ranulf le Meschin, 3rd Earl of Chester (d. 1129)
- Rostislav Vsevolodovich, Kievan prince (d. 1093)
- Sancho Nunes de Barbosa, Portuguese nobleman (d. 1130)
- Tescelin le Roux, Burgundian knight (approximate date)
- Thurstan, archbishop of York (approximate date)
- William de Corbeil, archbishop of Canterbury (d. 1136)
- William of Champeaux, French philosopher (d. 1121)

1071

- October 22 – William IX ("the Troubador"), duke of Aquitaine (d. 1127)
- Ibn al-Qalanisi, Arab politician and chronicler (d. 1160)

1072

- Agnes of Aquitaine, queen of Aragon and Navarre (d. 1097)
- Agnes of Waiblingen, daughter of Henry IV (or 1073)
- Welf II (or Welfhard), duke of Bavaria (d. 1120)
- Wulfhilde of Saxony, German noblewoman (d. 1126)

1073

- David IV ("the Builder"), king of Georgia (d. 1125)
- Leopold III ("the Good"), margrave of Austria (d. 1136)
- Magnus Barefoot, king of Norway (d. 1103)
- Meng, Chinese empress consort of the Song dynasty (d. 1131)
- Shaykh Tabarsi, Persian Shia scholar (d. 1153)
- Thomas of Marle, lord of Coucy (d. 1130)
- Approximate date
  - Agnes of Waiblingen, daughter of Henry IV, Holy Roman Emperor (d. 1143)
  - Alfonso the Battler, king of Aragon (d. 1134)
  - Al-Tighnari, Moorish botanist and physician (d. 1118)
  - Anastatius IV, pope of the Catholic Church (d. 1154)
  - Philippa, Countess of Toulouse, French noblewoman (d. 1118)
  - Zbigniew, duke of Poland (d. 1113?)
  - Lady Six Monkey, queen of the Mixtec city State of Huachino and queen of Jaltepec (d. 1101)

1074

- February 12 – Conrad II of Italy, king of Germany (d. 1101)
- April – Abu Mansur Mauhub al-Jawaliqi, Arab philologist (d. 1144)
- September 16 – Al-Musta'li, Fatimid caliph (d. 1101)
- Ibn al-Tilmidh, Syriac physician and poet (d. 1165)
- Approximate date
  - Edgar ("the Valliant"), king of Scotland (d. 1107)
  - Hugh I, count of Champagne
  - Maud, Countess of Huntingdon, queen consort of Scotland (d. 1130)

1075

- March 18 – Al-Zamakhshari, Persian philosopher (d. 1144)
- April 16 – Orderic Vitalis, English Benedictine chronicler
- June 5 – Tianzuo (Yanning), last emperor of the Liao dynasty
- November 25 – Taizong, emperor of the Jin dynasty (d. 1135)
- Adelaide del Vasto, countess and regent of Sicily (d. 1118)
- Bertha, queen of Aragon and Navarre (approximate date)
- Conrad I, archbishop of Salzburg (approximate date)
- Frederick I, archbishop of Cologne (approximate date)
- Gerald de Windsor, English nobleman (approximate date) (d. 1135)
- Kim Bu-sik, Korean statesman and general (d. 1151)
- Gisela of Burgundy, Marchioness of Montferrat, French noblewoman (d. 1135)
- Henry IX "the Black", duke of Bavaria (d. 1126)
- Jaya Pala, Indian king of Kamarupa (d. 1100)
- Jinadattasuri, Indian Jain poet and writer (d. 1154)
- Lothair III (or II) of Supplinburg, Holy Roman Emperor (d. 1137)
- Nicholas the Pilgrim, Italian shepherd and saint (d. 1094)
- Norbert of Xanten, archbishop of Magdeburg (d. 1134)
- Raymond Pilet d'Alès, French nobleman (d. 1120)
- Soběslav I (Sobeslaus), duke of Bohemia (d. 1140)
- Svatopluk "the Lion" of Olomouc, duke of Bohemia (d. 1109)
- Tancred, Italo-Norman leader of the First Crusade (d. 1112)

1076

- June 1 – Mstislav I "the Great"), Grand Prince of Kyiv (d. 1132)
- Fujiwara no Sadazane, Japanese calligrapher (d. 1120)
- Urban (or Gwrgan), bishop of Llandaff (d. 1134)
- Approximate date
  - Abu Bakr ibn al-Arabi, Moorish scholar and judge (d. 1148)
  - Hualani, Hawaiian queen and regent

1077

- January 7 – Zhezong, Chinese emperor of the Song dynasty (d. 1100)
- Joseph ibn Migash, Spanish scholar and rabbi (d. 1141)
- Ye Mengde, Chinese scholar, minister and poet (d. 1148)
- approximate date – Alexios Komnenos, Byzantine aristocrat and governor

1078

- March 17 – Abdul Qadir Gilani, Persian preacher (d. 1166)
- April/May – Al-Mustazhir, Abbasid caliph in Baghdad (d. 1118)
- Constance of France, princess of Antioch (d. 1125)
- Ermengol V, count of Urgell (Catalonia) (d. 1102)
- Fujiwara no Tadazane, Japanese nobleman (d. 1162)
- Ibn Quzman, Moorish poet and writer (d. 1160)
- Reishi, Japanese empress consort (d. 1144)
- Approximate date – Alexander I ("the Fierce"), king of Scotland (d. 1124)

1079

- February 11 – Yejong, king of Goryeo (d. 1122)
- April – Urraca, queen regnant of León, Castile and Galicia (d. 1126)
- August 8 – Horikawa, emperor of Japan (d. 1107)
- Abū Ṭāhir al-Silafī, Fatimid scholar and writer (d. 1180)
- Berardo dei Marsi, Italian cardinal and bishop (d. 1130)
- Dangereuse de l'Isle Bouchard, French noblewoman (d. 1151)
- Gampopa, Tibetan Buddhist monk and teacher (d. 1153)
- Kilij Arslan I, sultan of the Sultanate of Rum (d. 1107)
- Liu, Chinese empress of the Song dynasty (d. 1113)
- Peter Abelard, French scholastic philosopher (d. 1142)
- Zheng, Chinese empress of the Song dynasty (d. 1131)
- Approximate date – Diepold III, margrave of Vohburg

== Deaths ==
1070

- March 6 – Ulric I (or Oldaric), margrave of Carniola
- April 14 – Gerard (the Great), duke of Lorraine
- June 12 – Guido of Acqui (or Wido), Italian bishop
- July 6
  - Godelieve, Flemish saint (approximate date)
  - Said al-Andalusi, Taghlib Arab astronomer (b. 1029)
- July 17 – Baldwin VI (the Good), count of Flanders
- Abu 'Ubayd al-Juzjani, Persian physician and chronicler
- Athirajendra Chola, Indian ruler of the Chola Empire
- Áurea of San Millán, Spanish anchorite (b. 1043)
- Bisantius Guirdeliku, Italian nobleman (patrikios)
- Filarete of Calabria, Sicilian monk and saint
- Hārūn ibn Malik al-Turk, Turkic military leader
- Theobald of Dorat, French monk and saint (b. 990)
- Vigrahapala III, Indian ruler of the Pala Empire

1071

- January 26 – Adelaide of Eilenburg, German noblewoman
- February 17 – Frozza Orseolo, German noblewoman (b. 1015)
- February 22 (killed at the Battle of Cassel):
  - Arnulf III, count of Flanders (House of Flanders)
  - William FitzOsbern, 1st Earl of Hereford
- April 17 – Manuel Komnenos, Byzantine aristocrat
- May 24 – Wulfhild of Norway, duchess of Saxony (b. 1020)
- August 22 – Lambert II Suła, archbishop of Kraków
- September 5 – Al-Khatib al-Baghdadi, Arab scholar (b. 1002)
- October 16 – Almodis de la Marche, French nobleman
- December 2 – Ibn 'Abd al-Barr, Moorish judge (b. 978)
- Domenico I Contarini, doge of Venice
- Durand de Bredons, French abbot and bishop
- Edwin (or Ēadwine), earl of Mercia
- Eleanor of Normandy, countess of Flanders (b. 1010)
- Fujiwara no Yorimichi, Japanese nobleman (b. 992)
- Geoffrey of Hauteville, Norman military leader
- Guido da Velate (or Guy), archbishop of Milan
- Henry II, count of Leuven (House of Reginar)
- Ibn Zaydún, Andalusian poet and writer (b. 1003)
- Isabella of Urgell, queen consort of Aragon
- Robert Crispin, Norman mercenary leader
- William Malet, Norman nobleman (approximate date)

1072

- February 1 – Lý Thánh Tông, Vietnamese emperor (b. 1023)
- February 7 – Diarmait mac Máel na mBó, Irish king of Leinster
- February 22
  - Peter Damian, cardinal-bishop of Ostia (or 1073)
  - Stigand, Anglo-Saxon archbishop of Canterbury
- March 16 – Adalbert, archbishop of Hamburg
- March 28 – Ordulf (or Otto), duke of Saxony
- August 19 – Hawise, duchess of Brittany
- September 22 – Ouyang Xiu, Chinese historian and poet (b. 1007)
- October 7 – Sancho II, king of Castile and León
- October 15 – Æthelric, bishop of Durham
- November 13 – Adalbero III of Luxembourg, German nobleman
- November 24 – Bagrat IV, king of Georgia (b. 1018)
- December 15 – Alp Arslan, sultan of the Seljuk Empire (b. 1029)
- December 30 – Al-Qushayri, Persian Sufi scholar and theologian (b. 986)
- Honorius II, antipope of the Catholic Church
- Maredudd ab Owain ab Edwin, Welsh prince
- Otloh of Sankt Emmeram, German monk (approximate date)
- Qatran Tabrizi, Persian poet and writer (b. 1009)
- Romanos IV Diogenes, ruler of the Byzantine Empire
- Serlo II of Hauteville (or Sarlo), Norman nobleman

1073

- February 21 (approximate date) – Peter Damian, cardinal-bishop of Ostia (b. c. 1007)
- April 21 – Alexander II, pope of the Catholic Church (b. 1010/15)
- June 15 – Go-Sanjō, emperor of Japan (b. 1032)
- June 30 – Badis ibn Habus, Berber king of the Taifa of Granada (b. 1002)
- July 12 – John Gualbert, Italian monk, abbot and saint (b. c. 985)
- December 20 – Dominic of Silos, Spanish abbot (b. 1000)
- Anthony of Kiev, Russian monk and saint (b. 983)
- Zhou Dunyi, Chinese philosopher and cosmologist (b. 1017)
- Approximate date – Barisone I of Torres, Sardinian ruler (judge) of Arborea

1074

- February 7 – Pandulf IV of Benevento, Lombard prince
- April 25 – Herman I, margrave of Baden
- May 6 – Dúnán (or Donat(us)), 1st bishop of Dublin
- October 25 – Shōshi, empress of Japan (b. 988)
- Ibn al-Wafid, Andalusian pharmacologist
- Joseph Tarchaneiotes, Byzantine general
- Peter Krešimir IV, king of Croatia (or 1075)
- Ralph IV of Valois (or Raoul), French nobleman
- Wugunai, Chinese chieftain (b. 1021)
- Yang Wenguang, Chinese general

1075

- March 29 – Ottokar I (or Otakar), German nobleman
- April 2 – Al-Qa'im, Abbasid caliph in Baghdad (b. 1001)
- April 15 – Erlembald Cotta, Italian military leader
- May 21 – Richeza (or Adelaide), Hungarian queen
- June 9 – Gebhard of Supplinburg, German nobleman
- June 10 – Ernest (the Brave), margrave of Austria (b. 1027)
- June 23 – Theodwin, prince-bishop of Liège
- August 2 – John VIII, patriarch of Constantinople
- August 27 – Minamoto no Yoriyoshi, Japanese nobleman (b. 988)
- November 6 – Fujiwara no Norimichi, Japanese nobleman (b. 996)
- December 4 – Anno II, archbishop of Cologne
- December 13 – Xiao Guanyin, Chinese empress (b. 1040)
- December 18 – Edith of Wessex, English queen
- Alī ibn Ahmad al-Nasawī, Persian mathematician
- Al-Mamun, Andalusian emir of the Taifa of Toledo
- Amhalgaidh mac Cathal, king of Maigh Seóla
- Anne of Kiev (or Agnes), French queen and regent
- Dedi I (or Dedo), margrave of the Saxon Ostmark
- Domnall mac Murchada, king of Leinster and Dublin
- Frederick II, German nobleman and overlord (b. 1005)
- Gofraid mac Amlaíb meic Ragnaill, king of Dublin
- Gundekar II (or Gunzo), bishop of Eichstätt (b. 1019)
- Ibn Butlan, Arab Nestorian Christian physician (b. 1038)
- Ibn Hayyan, Moorish historian and writer (b. 987)
- John Xiphilinus, Byzantine historian (approximate date)
- Peter Krešimir IV, king of Croatia (or 1074)
- Rashid al-Dawla Mahmud, Mirdasid emir of Aleppo
- Siward (or Sigweard), bishop of Rochester

1076

- February 26 or 27 – Godfrey the Hunchback, duke of Lower Lorraine
- March 18 – Ermengarde of Anjou, duchess of Burgundy
- March 21 – Robert I ("the Old"), duke of Burgundy (b. 1011)
- April 18 – Beatrice of Bar, French duchess and regent
- April 28 – Sweyn II Estridsson, king of Denmark
- May 8 – Nasr ibn Mahmud, Mirdasid emir of Aleppo
- May 26 – Ramon Berenguer I, count of Barcelona (b. 1023)
- May 31 – Waltheof, earl of Northumbria (executed)
- June 4 – Sancho IV, king of Pamplona (or Navarre)
- July 15 – Arnost (or Arnošt), bishop of Rochester
- Ramihrdus of Cambrai, French heretic priest and martyr (or 1077)
- William Busac, French nobleman (jure uxoris) (b. 1020)

1077

- April 11 – Anawrahta, founder of the Pagan Empire (b. 1014)
- April 25 – Géza I ("Magnus"), king of Hungary
- October 14 – Andronikos Doukas, Byzantine nobleman
- November 27 – Landulf VI, prince of Benevento
- December 14 – Agnes of Poitou, Holy Roman Empress
- December 21 – Abu'l-Fadl Bayhaqi, Persian historian (b. 995)
- December 27 – Sviatoslav II, Grand Prince of Kyiv (b. 1027)
- date unknown
  - Eleanor of Normandy, countess of Flanders (b. 1010)
  - Minamoto no Takakuni, Japanese nobleman (b. 1004)
  - Roussel de Bailleul, Norman warrior and military leader
  - Shao Yong, Chinese philosopher and cosmologist (b. 1011)
  - Zhang Zai, Chinese philosopher and cosmologist (b. 1020)

1078

- January – Immilla of Turin, Italian noblewoman
- February 20 – Herman, bishop of Salisbury
- May 30 – Gleb Svyatoslavich, Kievan prince
- August 9 – Peter I, Italian nobleman
- August 26 – Herluin, founder of Bec Abbey
- October 3
  - Boris Vyacheslavich, prince of Chernigov
  - Iziaslav I, Grand Prince of Kyiv (b. 1024)
- November 6 – Berthold II, duke of Carinthia
- November 11 – Udo, archbishop of Trier
- Andreas (or Andrew), archbishop of Bari, convert to Judaism
- Mu'ayyad fi'l-Din al-Shirazi, Fatimid scholar (b. 1000)
- Nikephoritzes, Byzantine governor
- Rhys ab Owain, Welsh king of Deheubarth
- Richard I (Drengot), prince of Capua
- Tunka Manin, ruler of the Ghana Empire (b. 1010)
- Zeng Gongliang, Chinese scholar and writer (b. 998)
- Zhang Xian, Chinese poet and writer (b. 990)
- Approximate date – Abd al-Qahir al-Jurjani, Persian scholar

1079

- January 8 – Adela of France, countess of Flanders (b. 1009)
- February 22 – John of Fécamp, Italian-Norman abbot
- April 11 – Stanislaus of Szczepanów, Polish bishop (b. 1030)
- August 2 – Roman Svyatoslavich, Kievan prince
- August 5 – Hezilo (or Hettilo), bishop of Hildesheim
- October – Atsiz ibn Uwaq, Turkish emir of Damascus
- November 16 – Cao, empress of the Song dynasty (b. 1016)
- Adelaide of Savoy, duchess of Swabia (approximate date)
- Aedh Ua Flaithbheartaigh, king of Iar Connacht
- Al-Jayyānī, Arab scholar and mathematician (b. 989)
- Cellach húa Rúanada, Irish chief ollam and poet
- Håkan the Red, king of Sweden (approximate date)
- Íñigo López, Spanish nobleman (approximate date)
- John of Avranches, French archbishop and writer
- Odo of Rennes, duke and regent of Brittany (b. 999)
- Roger d'Ivry (or Perceval), Norman nobleman
- Wen Tong, Chinese painter and calligrapher (b. 1019)
