= 1076 =

1076 in various calendars
- Gregorian calendar: 1076; MLXXVI
- Ab urbe condita: 1829
- Armenian calendar: 525; ԹՎ ՇԻԵ
- Assyrian calendar: 5826
- Balinese saka calendar: 997–998
- Bengali calendar: 482–483
- Berber calendar: 2026
- English Regnal year: 10 Will. 1 – 11 Will. 1
- Buddhist calendar: 1620
- Burmese calendar: 438
- Byzantine calendar: 6584–6585
- Chinese calendar: 乙卯年 (Wood Rabbit); 3773 or 3566 — to — 丙辰年 (Fire Dragon); 3774 or 3567
- Coptic calendar: 792–793
- Discordian calendar: 2242
- Ethiopian calendar: 1068–1069
- Hebrew calendar: 4836–4837
- Hindu calendars
- Vikram Samvat: 1132–1133
- Shaka Samvat: 997–998
- Kali Yuga: 4176–4177
- Holocene calendar: 11076
- Igbo calendar: 76–77
- Iranian calendar: 454–455
- Islamic calendar: 468–469
- Japanese calendar: Jōhō 3 (承保３年)
- Javanese calendar: 980–981
- Julian calendar: 1076; MLXXVI
- Korean calendar: 3409
- Minguo calendar: 836 before ROC 民前836年
- Nanakshahi calendar: −392
- Seleucid era: 1387/1388 AG
- Thai solar calendar: 1618–1619
- Tibetan calendar: ཤིང་མོ་ཡོས་ལོ་ (female Wood-Hare); 1202 or 821 or 49 — to — མེ་ཕོ་འབྲུག་ལོ་ (male Fire-Dragon); 1203 or 822 or 50

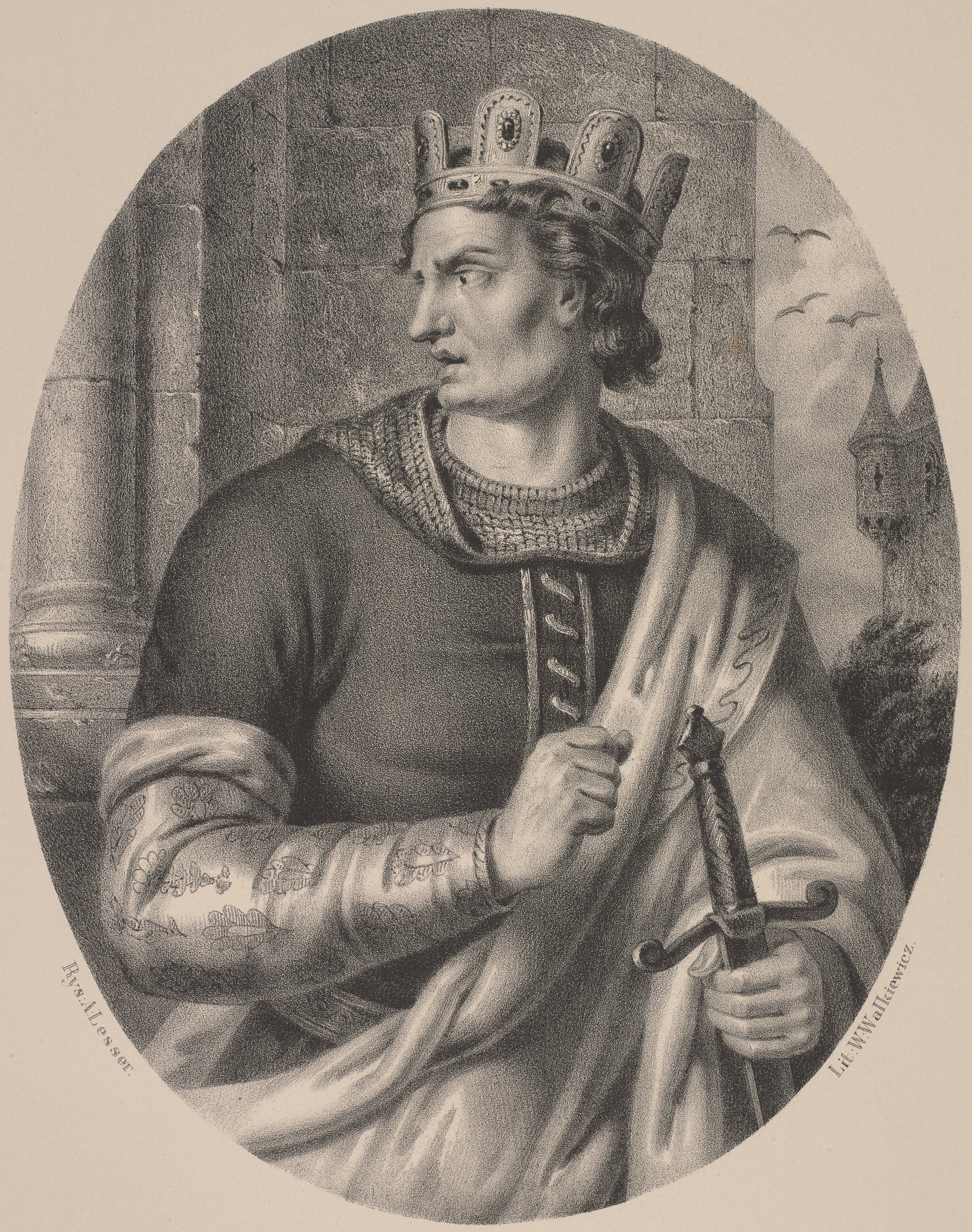
Bolesław II the Bold, King of Poland

Year 1076 (MLXXVI) was a leap year starting on Friday of the Julian calendar.

== Events ==
=== By place ===
==== Europe ====
- January 24 – Synod of Worms: Emperor Henry IV, holds a synod in Worms (modern Germany). The assembly declares Pope Gregory VII deposed, and the bishops abandon their allegiance to him.
- February 22 – Gregory VII pronounces a sentence of excommunication against Henry IV at Rome. He is excluded from the Catholic Church, and all the bishops named by Henry are excommunicated.
- Summer – Dirk V, count of Holland, re-conquers West Frisia (modern Netherlands) from the Archdiocese of Utrecht. He besieges Bishop Conrad at the castle of IJsselmonde, taking him prisoner.
- October 8 – Demetrius Zvonimir is crowned as king of Croatia in Solin (near Split), in the Basilica of Saint Peter and Moses (known later as the Hollow Church) by a representative of Gregory VII.
- December 13 – Norman conquest of southern Italy: Italo-Norman forces under Robert Guiscard de Hauteville and Richard I of Capua, conquer the fortress city of Salerno after a short siege.
- December 26 – Bolesław II the Bold (or "the Generous") is crowned as King of Poland by Archbishop Bogumił in Gniezno Cathedral. Bolesław supports Gregory VII in his conflict against Henry IV.

==== England ====
- May 31 – Waltheof, Earl of Northumbria, a participant in the Revolt of the Earls against King William the Conqueror, is beheaded near Winchester.
- November 1 – A frost begins that lasts until April 1077.
- Approximate date – The Trial of Penenden Heath is held, with an important ruling regarding land rights subsequent to the Norman Conquest.

==== Africa ====
- Approximate date – Koumbi Saleh, an important mercantile and political center of the Ghana Empire (modern Mauritania), is besieged by the Almoravids.

==== Asia ====
- Vikramaditya VI deposes his older brother Someshvara II to become king of the Western Chalukya Empire (modern India).

=== By topic ===
==== Literature ====
- Anselm of Aosta, an Italian Benedictine abbot, completes his Monologion at the request of his fellow monks.

==== Religion ====
- Demetrius Zvonimir donates the Benedictine monastery of St. Gregory in Vrana to Gregory VII.

== Births ==
- June 1 – Mstislav I "the Great"), Grand Prince of Kiev (d. 1132)
- Fujiwara no Sadazane, Japanese calligrapher (d. 1120)
- Urban (or Gwrgan), bishop of Llandaff (d. 1134)
- Approximate date
  - Abu Bakr ibn al-Arabi, Moorish scholar and judge (d. 1148)
  - Hualani, Hawaiian queen and regent

== Deaths ==
- February 26 or 27 – Godfrey the Hunchback, duke of Lower Lorraine
- March 18 – Ermengarde of Anjou, duchess of Burgundy
- March 21 – Robert I ("the Old"), duke of Burgundy (b. 1011)
- April 18 – Beatrice of Bar, French duchess and regent
- April 28 – Sweyn II Estridsson, king of Denmark
- May 8 – Nasr ibn Mahmud, Mirdasid emir of Aleppo
- May 26 – Ramon Berenguer I, count of Barcelona (b. 1023)
- May 31 – Waltheof, earl of Northumbria (executed)
- June 4 – Sancho IV, king of Pamplona (or Navarre)
- July 15 – Arnost (or Arnošt), bishop of Rochester
- Ramihrdus of Cambrai, French heretic priest and martyr (or 1077)
- William Busac, French nobleman (jure uxoris) (b. 1020)
