= 1077 =

1077 in various calendars
| Gregorian calendar | 1077; MLXXVII |
| Ab urbe condita | 1830 |
| Armenian calendar | 526; ԹՎ ՇԻԶ |
| Assyrian calendar | 5827 |
| Balinese saka calendar | 998–999 |
| Bengali calendar | 483–484 |
| Berber calendar | 2027 |
| English Regnal year | 11 Will. 1 – 12 Will. 1 |
| Buddhist calendar | 1621 |
| Burmese calendar | 439 |
| Byzantine calendar | 6585–6586 |
| Chinese calendar | 丙辰年 (Fire Dragon); 3774 or 3567 — to — 丁巳年 (Fire Snake); 3775 or 3568 |
| Coptic calendar | 793–794 |
| Discordian calendar | 2243 |
| Ethiopian calendar | 1069–1070 |
| Hebrew calendar | 4837–4838 |
- Hindu calendars
| Vikram Samvat | 1133–1134 |
| Shaka Samvat | 998–999 |
| Kali Yuga | 4177–4178 |
| Holocene calendar | 11077 |
| Igbo calendar | 77–78 |
| Iranian calendar | 455–456 |
| Islamic calendar | 469–470 |
| Japanese calendar | Jōhō 4 / Jōryaku 1 (承暦元年) |
| Javanese calendar | 981–982 |
| Julian calendar | 1077; MLXXVII |
| Korean calendar | 3410 |
| Minguo calendar | 835 before ROC 民前835年 |
| Nanakshahi calendar | −391 |
| Seleucid era | 1388/1389 AG |
| Thai solar calendar | 1619–1620 |
| Tibetan calendar | མེ་ཕོ་འབྲུག་ལོ་ (male Fire-Dragon); 1203 or 822 or 50 — to — མེ་མོ་སྦྲུལ་ལོ་ (female Fire-Snake); 1204 or 823 or 51 |

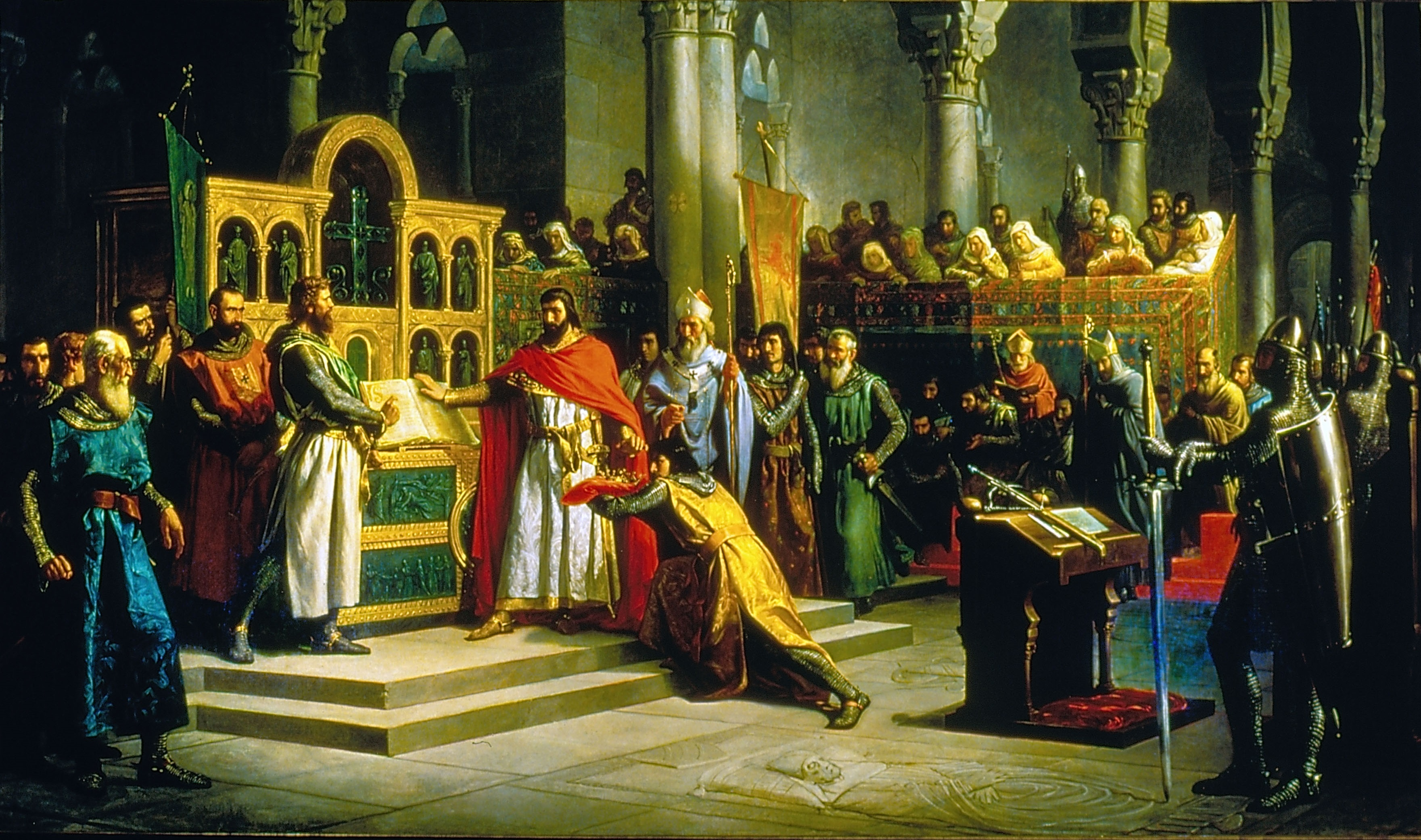
King Alfonso VI is crowned, and becomes "Emperor of all Spain".

Year 1077 (MLXXVII) was a common year starting on Sunday of the Julian calendar.

== Events ==
=== By place ===
==== Byzantine Empire ====
- Fall – Nikephoros Bryennios the Elder, governor (doux) of the Theme of Dyrrhachium in the western Balkans, and Nikephoros Botaneiates, a general (strategos) of the Theme of Anatolics (modern Turkey), are proclaimed emperors by their troops. Emperor Michael VII Doukas offers Bryennios the title of caesar (co-emperor) if he submits to his rule, but Bryennios refuses. He sets out from Dyrrhachium, and marches towards Constantinople.

==== Europe ====
- January 25 – Walk to Canossa: Emperor Henry IV travels to the Castle of Canossa near Reggio Emilia (Northern Italy), to visit Pope Gregory VII. He waits (with his wife Bertha of Savoy and son Conrad) at the gates for three days, for absolution of his excommunication. Gregory lifts the sentence, imposing on Henry a vow to comply with certain conditions (see Investiture Controversy).
- King Alfonso VI ("the Brave") reaches an agreement with his cousin Sancho Ramírez, who is elected as king of Navarre. Alfonso annexes the territories of Álava, part of Gipuzkoa and La Bureba, he is crowned and adopts the title of Imperator totius Hispaniae ("Emperor of all Spain").
- March 14 – German nobles opposing king Henry IV elected an antiking, Rudolf of Rheinfelden, despite king Henry having been absolved.
- April 3 – Henry IV grants the County of Friuli (with ducal status) to Sigaerd of Beilstein, patriarch of Aquileia. He creates the first Parliament, representing the communes as well the nobility and clergy.
- Hugh I, duke of Burgundy, supports Sancho Ramírez (or Sancho V) in his conquest of the Castle of Muñones from Emir Ahmad al-Muqtadir, who rules the Taifa of Zaragoza.
- King Mihailo I is given the title "King of the Slavs" by Gregory VII. He becomes the first recognized ruler of the kingdom of Duklja (modern Montenegro).

==== England ====
- August 14 – A fire destroys much of London.
- Robert Curthose instigates his first insurrection against his father, King William the Conqueror in the Normandy.
- The first recorded trial by combat is held between Wulfstan and Walter.

==== Seljuk Empire ====
- Suleiman ibn Qutulmish, a cousin of late Sultan Alp Arslan, consolidates his leadership over the Oghuz Turks and founds the Sultanate of Rum (modern Turkey).
- Anushtegin Gharchai becomes governor (shihna) of Khwarezm and a vassal of the Seljuk Empire (until 1097).

==== Africa ====
- The Almoravids complete the conquest of the Ghana Empire, and reach Spain (approximate date).

=== By topic ===
==== Arts ====
- The Bayeux Tapestry (embroidery) is completed, probably in England, possibly to unveil at the dedication of Bayeux Cathedral this year.

==== Religion ====
- September 1 – Pope Gregory VII appoints Landulf as bishop of Pisa. He makes him permanent legate of the Holy See in Corsica.
- Paul of Caen is installed as abbot of St. Albans in England. He commences the building of St. Albans Abbey Church.
- Pope Christodolos ends his reign as leader of the Coptic Orthodox Church of Alexandria (modern Egypt).

== Births ==
- January 7 – Zhezong, Chinese emperor of the Song dynasty (d. 1100)
- Joseph ibn Migash, Spanish scholar and rabbi (d. 1141)
- Ye Mengde, Chinese scholar, minister and poet (d. 1148)
- approximate date – Alexios Komnenos, Byzantine aristocrat and governor

== Deaths ==
- April 11 – Anawrahta, founder of the Pagan Empire (b. 1014)
- April 25 – Géza I ("Magnus"), king of Hungary
- October 14 – Andronikos Doukas, Byzantine nobleman
- November 27 – Landulf VI, prince of Benevento
- December 14 – Agnes of Poitou, Holy Roman Empress
- December 21 – Abu'l-Fadl Bayhaqi, Persian historian (b. 995)
- December 27 – Sviatoslav II, Grand Prince of Kiev (b. 1027)
- date unknown
  - Eleanor of Normandy, countess of Flanders (b. 1010)
  - Minamoto no Takakuni, Japanese nobleman (b. 1004)
  - Roussel de Bailleul, Norman warrior and military leader
  - Shao Yong, Chinese philosopher and cosmologist (b. 1011)
  - Zhang Zai, Chinese philosopher and cosmologist (b. 1020)
