= 1070 =

1070 in various calendars
- Gregorian calendar: 1070; MLXX
- Ab urbe condita: 1823
- Armenian calendar: 519; ԹՎ ՇԺԹ
- Assyrian calendar: 5820
- Balinese saka calendar: 991–992
- Bengali calendar: 476–477
- Berber calendar: 2020
- English Regnal year: 4 Will. 1 – 5 Will. 1
- Buddhist calendar: 1614
- Burmese calendar: 432
- Byzantine calendar: 6578–6579
- Chinese calendar: 己酉年 (Earth Rooster); 3767 or 3560 — to — 庚戌年 (Metal Dog); 3768 or 3561
- Coptic calendar: 786–787
- Discordian calendar: 2236
- Ethiopian calendar: 1062–1063
- Hebrew calendar: 4830–4831
- Hindu calendars
- Vikram Samvat: 1126–1127
- Shaka Samvat: 991–992
- Kali Yuga: 4170–4171
- Holocene calendar: 11070
- Igbo calendar: 70–71
- Iranian calendar: 448–449
- Islamic calendar: 462–463
- Japanese calendar: Enkyū 2 (延久２年)
- Javanese calendar: 974–975
- Julian calendar: 1070; MLXX
- Korean calendar: 3403
- Minguo calendar: 842 before ROC 民前842年
- Nanakshahi calendar: −398
- Seleucid era: 1381/1382 AG
- Thai solar calendar: 1612–1613
- Tibetan calendar: ས་མོ་བྱ་ལོ་ (female Earth-Bird); 1196 or 815 or 43 — to — ལྕགས་ཕོ་ཁྱི་ལོ་ (male Iron-Dog); 1197 or 816 or 44

Year 1070 (MLXX) was a common year starting on Friday of the Julian calendar, the 1070th year of the Common Era (CE) and Anno Domini (AD) designations, the 70th year of the 2nd millennium, the 70th year of the 11th century, and the 1st year of the 1070s decade.

== Events ==
- Spring – King Sweyn II of Denmark joins rebels in England led by Hereward the Wake and captures the Isle of Ely in The Fens of East Anglia. On June 1 Hereward sacks Peterborough Abbey with support from Sweyn's Danes.
- Harrying of the North: William the Conqueror quells rebellions in the north of his Kingdom of England following the invasion by Sweyn II. Widespread famine follows the devastation wrought.
- April 11 – Stigand is deposed as Archbishop of Canterbury in England by papal legates and imprisoned.
- April – Council of Winchester.
- May 1 – After 353 years of being exiled to Lugo due to the Muslim occupation of the city of Braga, the Diocese of Braga is restored by order of Ferdinand I of León under Archbishop Pedro of Braga thanks to the advancing Christian forces during the Reconquista.
- June – Denmark signs a treaty with England; Sweyn II and his forces leave the country.
- June 9 – Kulottunga I begins his reign as Chola emperor in South India.
- August 15 – The Pavian-born Benedictine Lanfranc is appointed as the new Archbishop of Canterbury in England.
- An invasion of England by Malcolm III of Scotland is repelled.
- Hugh d'Avranches, 1st Earl of Chester, the first Marcher Lord, invades Wales, capturing parts of Gwynedd.
- A successful Byzantine counter-attack drives the Seljuq Turks across the Euphrates.
- Bergen is founded by King Olaf III of Norway; it will function as the main city and capital of Norway, until it is replaced by Oslo in 1314.
- Chinese Chancellor Wang Anshi starts the Xining Reforms (which last until 1085).
- Jews from Rouen in Normandy settle in England at the invitation of King William I.
- The Temple of Literature, Hanoi, is established in Hanoi, capital of Vietnam.
- Uyghur poet Yusuf Khass Hajib of Balasagun, in the Kara-Khanid Khanate, completes the Kutadgu Bilig ("The Wisdom Which Brings Good Fortune"), and presents it to the prince of Kashgar.
- Song dynasty Chinese astronomer, engineer and statesman Su Song completes the compilation of the Ben Cao Tu Jing, a pharmaceutical treatise with related subjects of botany, zoology, mineralogy and metallurgy.
- Vijayabahu I expelled the Cholas from Ceylon, establishing the Kingdom of Polonnaruwa.
- The rebuilding of Canterbury Cathedral in England following a fire begins.
- The rebuilding of York Minster in England begins.
- Construction of Richmond Castle in North Yorkshire, England, by Alan Rufus begins.
- Approximate date – Halsten Stenkilsson is deposed as king of Sweden, with Håkan the Red becoming king in Götaland, and Anund Gårdske being chosen as king of Svealand.

== Births ==
- Allucio of Campugliano, Italian diplomat (d. 1134)
- Bertrade de Montfort, queen of France (d. 1117)
- Buthaina bint al-Mu'tamid ibn Abbad, Al-Andalus poet
- Coloman (the Learned), king of Hungary (d. 1116)
- Eupraxia of Kiev, Holy Roman Empress (d. 1109)
- Gertrude of Flanders, duchess of Lorraine (d. 1117)
- Giso IV, count of Gudensberg (approximate date)
- Gualfardo of Verona, Italian trader and hermit (d. 1127)
- Guerric of Igny, French abbot (approximate date)
- Henry I (the Elder), German nobleman (d. 1103)
- Hugues de Payens, French knight (approximate date)
- John Komnenos, Byzantine aristocrat and official
- Lothair Udo III, margrave of the Nordmark (d. 1106)
- Meinhard I, German nobleman (approximate date)
- Otto (the Rich), German nobleman (approximate date)
- Ralph of Pont-Echanfray, Norman knight (d. 1120)
- Ramiro Sánchez, Spanish nobleman (approximate date)
- Ranulf le Meschin, 3rd Earl of Chester (d. 1129)
- Rostislav Vsevolodovich, Kievan prince (d. 1093)
- Sancho Nunes de Barbosa, Portuguese nobleman (d. 1130)
- Tescelin le Roux, Burgundian knight (approximate date)
- Thurstan, archbishop of York (approximate date)
- William de Corbeil, archbishop of Canterbury (d. 1136)
- William of Champeaux, French philosopher (d. 1121)

== Deaths ==
- March 6 – Ulric I (or Oldaric), margrave of Carniola
- April 14 – Gerard (the Great), duke of Lorraine
- June 12 – Guido of Acqui (or Wido), Italian bishop
- July 6
  - Godelieve, Flemish saint (approximate date)
  - Said al-Andalusi, Taghlib Arab astronomer (b. 1029)
- July 17 – Baldwin VI (the Good), count of Flanders
- Abu 'Ubayd al-Juzjani, Persian physician and chronicler
- Athirajendra Chola, Indian ruler of the Chola Empire
- Áurea of San Millán, Spanish anchorite (b. 1043)
- Bisantius Guirdeliku, Italian nobleman (patrikios)
- Filarete of Calabria, Sicilian monk and saint
- Hārūn ibn Malik al-Turk, Turkic military leader
- Theobald of Dorat, French monk and saint (b. 990)
- Vigrahapala III, Indian ruler of the Pala Empire
