= 1134 =

1134 in various calendars
- Gregorian calendar: 1134; MCXXXIV
- Ab urbe condita: 1887
- Armenian calendar: 583; ԹՎ ՇՁԳ
- Assyrian calendar: 5884
- Balinese saka calendar: 1055–1056
- Bengali calendar: 540–541
- Berber calendar: 2084
- English Regnal year: 34 Hen. 1 – 35 Hen. 1
- Buddhist calendar: 1678
- Burmese calendar: 496
- Byzantine calendar: 6642–6643
- Chinese calendar: 癸丑年 (Water Ox); 3831 or 3624 — to — 甲寅年 (Wood Tiger); 3832 or 3625
- Coptic calendar: 850–851
- Discordian calendar: 2300
- Ethiopian calendar: 1126–1127
- Hebrew calendar: 4894–4895
- Hindu calendars
- Vikram Samvat: 1190–1191
- Shaka Samvat: 1055–1056
- Kali Yuga: 4234–4235
- Holocene calendar: 11134
- Igbo calendar: 134–135
- Iranian calendar: 512–513
- Islamic calendar: 528–529
- Japanese calendar: Chōshō 3 (長承３年)
- Javanese calendar: 1040–1041
- Julian calendar: 1134; MCXXXIV
- Korean calendar: 3467
- Minguo calendar: 778 before ROC 民前778年
- Nanakshahi calendar: −334
- Seleucid era: 1445/1446 AG
- Thai solar calendar: 1676–1677
- Tibetan calendar: ཆུ་མོ་གླང་ལོ་ (female Water-Ox); 1260 or 879 or 107 — to — ཤིང་ཕོ་སྟག་ལོ་ (male Wood-Tiger); 1261 or 880 or 108

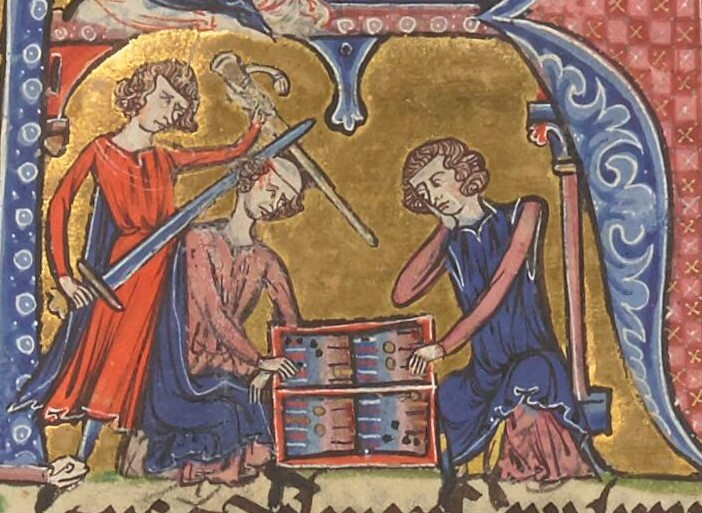
Hugh II is attacked by a Breton knight

Year 1134 (MCXXXIV) was a common year starting on Monday of the Julian calendar.

== Events ==
=== By place ===
==== Asia ====
- Count Hugh II (du Puiset), in alliance with the Egyptian city of Ascalon, revolts against King Fulk V of Jerusalem, attempting to take Jaffa. Hugh submits to Fulk and is exiled for three years. While awaiting for a boat to Italy he is attacked by a Breton knight, but survives the attempted murder. Hugh retires to the Sicilian court of his cousin, King Roger II, who appoints him to the lordship of Gargano, where he dies soon afterwards.
- Mas'ud becomes sultan of the Seljuk dynasty in Hamadan.
- Yelü Dashi captures Balasagun from the Kara-Khanid Khanate, marking the start of the Qara Khitai empire (and its Kangguo era) in Central Asia.
- Wu Ge, Chinese Song dynasty Deputy Transport Commissioner of Zhejiang, has paddle wheel warships constructed with a total of nine wheels, and others with thirteen wheels.

==== Eastern Europe ====
- Vsevolod Mstislavich of Novgorod defeats the Chuds and captures Tartu.
- Yuri Dolgoruki founds the town of Skniatino.
- Iziaslav II of Kiev becomes Prince of Vladimir and Volyn.
- Viacheslav of Kiev becomes Prince of Turov.

==== Mediterranean ====
- Ermengarde becomes Viscountess of Narbonne.
- Narbonne is seized by Alphonse I of Toulouse.
- Battle of Fraga: Castilian forces are defeated by Muslim troops. King Alfonso I (the Battler) is killed and succeeded by his brother Ramiro II as ruler of Aragon. In Navarre the nobility elects Garcia VI as Alfonso's successor.
- Roger II of Sicily defeats a revolt in Naples.
- Called by Olegarius, the bishop of Tarragona, the Knights Templar establish their first stronghold in Catalonia.

==== Scandinavia ====
- Battle of Färlev: Magnus IV of Norway defeats Harald IV Gille of Norway.
- Battle of Fotevik: Harald Kesja and Magnus the Strong are defeated by the forces of Erik Emune.
- Eric II becomes King of Denmark.
- The House of Brandenburg is founded, when Albrecht the Bear is made head of the Nordmark.

==== Western Europe ====
- Aed mac Domnaill becomes King of Ui Failghe.
- Much of Chartres, France, is destroyed by fire.
- Henry of Lausanne is sentenced to imprisonment by Pope Innocent II.
- The Zeeland archipelago is created by a massive storm in the North Sea.
- Herman III (the Great), margrave of Baden, marries Bertha of Lorraine.

=== By topic ===
==== Culture ====
- May 13 – The Saint-Denis basilica, near Paris, is damaged by a fire. This will give the opportunity to the French abbot Suger to rebuild it in a new style, which will open the Gothic period of architecture.
- The University of Salamanca is established, in the Kingdom of León.
- Abdul Qadir Jilani becomes principal of the Hanbali school in Baghdad.
- The Japanese classic text Uchigikishu is written.
- Robert of Ketton and Herman of Carinthia travel throughout France, the Byzantine Empire, and the Crusader States.

==== Religion ====
- Cormac's Chapel is consecrated.
- Malachy becomes archbishop of Armagh.
- The Church of St. James is dedicated in Glasgow.
- The Augustinian Runcorn Priory is transferred to Norton Priory.
- Buckfastleigh Abbey is refounded.
- Aelred of Hexham enters the monastery at Rievaulx Abbey.
- Stephen Harding becomes abbot of Cîteaux Abbey.
- Hugh of Grenoble is canonized by Innocent II.
- The Cathedral of St. Petri in Schleswig is completed.
- The Abbey of St. Jacob is founded in Würzburg.
- Evermode of Ratzeburg becomes abbot of Gottesgnaden.
- The Humiliati retreat to a monastery in Milan.
- Leo Styppes becomes Patriarch of Constantinople.

== Births ==
- June 1 – Geoffrey VI, count of Nantes (d. 1158)
- September 9 – Abdul Razzaq Gilani, Persian jurist (d. 1207)
- Bernhard III, German nobleman (approximate date)
- Fujiwara no Kinshi, Japanese empress (d. 1209)
- Gerardo dei Tintori, Italian mystic and founder (d. 1207)
- Neophytos of Cyprus, Cypriot Orthodox priest (d. 1214)
- Oda of Brabant (or Anderlues), Belgian prioress (d. 1158)
- Oldřich (or Oldericus), duke of Olomouc (d. 1177)
- Ralph I, French nobleman (approximate date)
- Raymond V, count of Toulouse (approximate date)
- Sancho III (the Desired), king of Castile (d. 1158)
- Sverker I (the Elder), king of Sweden (d. 1156)
- Yesugei (Baghatur), Mongol chieftain (d. 1171)

== Deaths ==
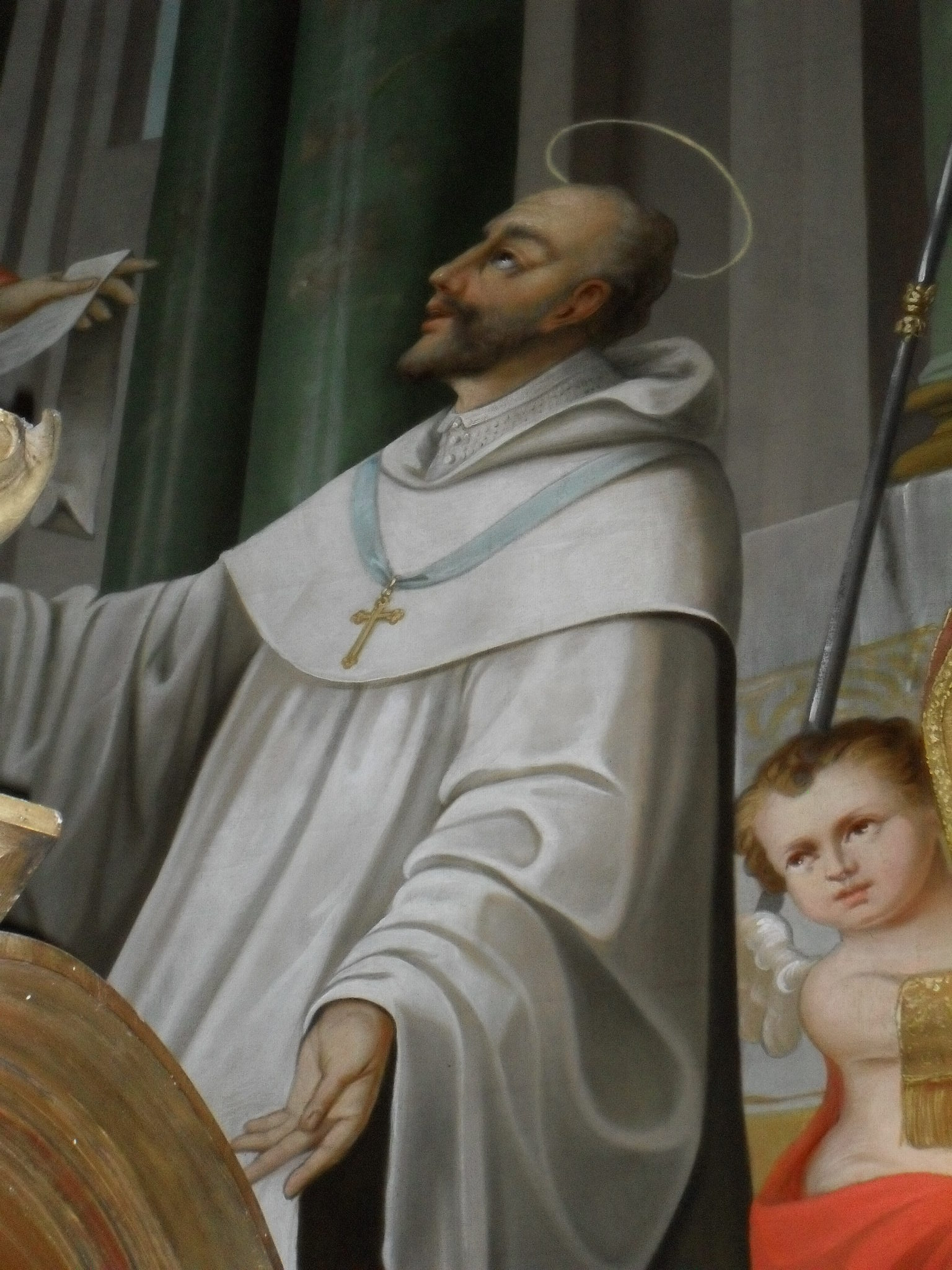
Saint Stephen Harding died on March 28, 1134

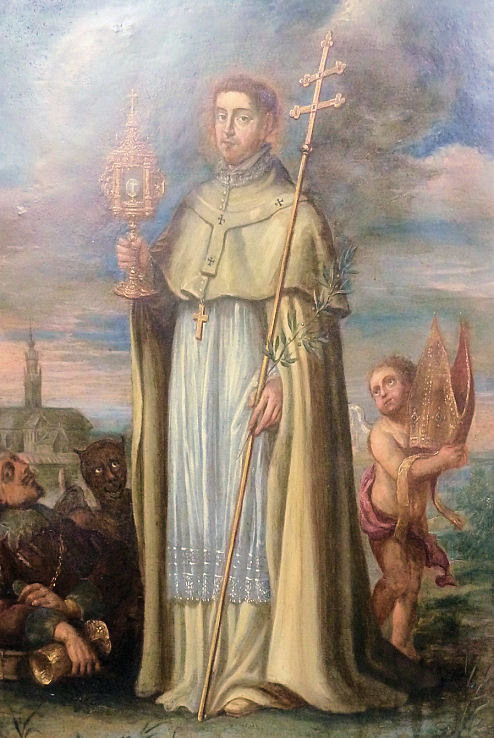
Norbert of Xanten died on June 6, 1134

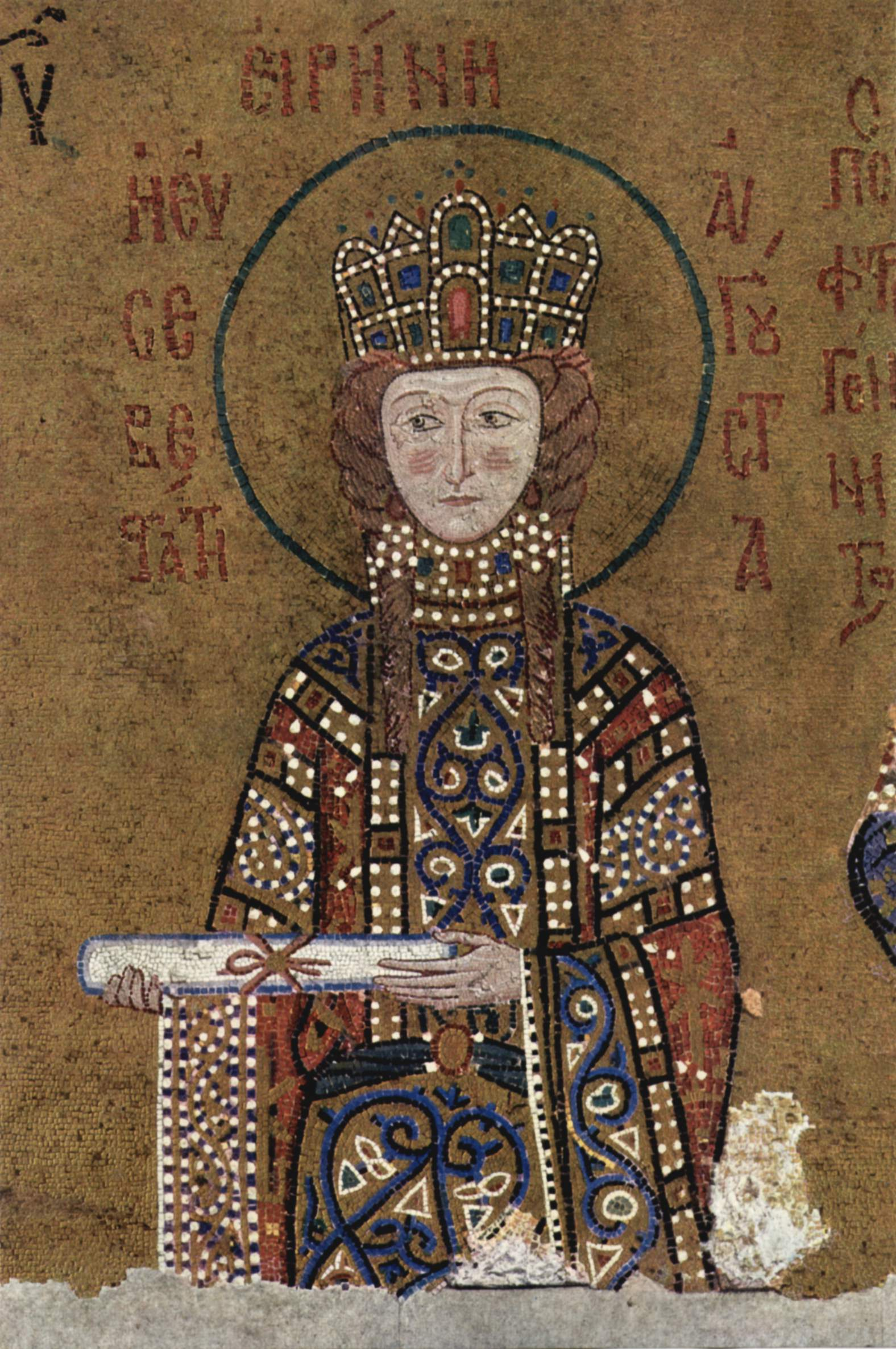
Saint Irene of Hungary died on August 13, 1134

- March 28 – Stephen Harding, English abbot
- June 4 – Magnus the Strong (Nilsson), king of Västergötland
- June 6 – Norbert of Xanten, German archbishop
- June 25 – Niels (or Nicholas), king of Denmark
- July 17
  - Beltrán de Risnel, Aragonese diplomat
  - Centule VI (or Centulle), French nobleman
- August 9 – Gilbert Universalis, English bishop
- August 13 – Irene of Hungary, Byzantine empress (b. 1088)
- September 7 – Alfonso I (the Battler), king of Aragon
- October 23 – Abu al-Salt, Andalusian astronomer
- Alexander of Jülich, prince-bishop of Liège
- Al-Fath ibn Khaqan, Andalusian anthologist
- Allucio of Campugliano, Italian diplomat (b. 1070)
- Bjørn Haraldsen (Ironside), Danish prince
- Hugh II (du Puiset), French nobleman
- John IX (Agapetos), Byzantine patriarch
- Mary and Eliza Chulkhurst, English conjoined twins (b. 1100)
- Minamoto no Yoshitsuna, Japanese samurai
- Robert II (Curthose), duke of Normandy (b. 1051)
- Urban (or Gwrgan), bishop of Llandaff (b. 1076)

== Sources ==
- Fletcher, R. A. (1987). "Reconquest and Crusade in Spain c. 1050-1150". Transactions of the Royal Historical Society. 5. 37: 31–47. doi:10.2307/3679149. JSTOR 3679149.
