= 1126 =

1126 in various calendars
- Gregorian calendar: 1126; MCXXVI
- Ab urbe condita: 1879
- Armenian calendar: 575; ԹՎ ՇՀԵ
- Assyrian calendar: 5876
- Balinese saka calendar: 1047–1048
- Bengali calendar: 532–533
- Berber calendar: 2076
- English Regnal year: 26 Hen. 1 – 27 Hen. 1
- Buddhist calendar: 1670
- Burmese calendar: 488
- Byzantine calendar: 6634–6635
- Chinese calendar: 乙巳年 (Wood Snake); 3823 or 3616 — to — 丙午年 (Fire Horse); 3824 or 3617
- Coptic calendar: 842–843
- Discordian calendar: 2292
- Ethiopian calendar: 1118–1119
- Hebrew calendar: 4886–4887
- Hindu calendars
- Vikram Samvat: 1182–1183
- Shaka Samvat: 1047–1048
- Kali Yuga: 4226–4227
- Holocene calendar: 11126
- Igbo calendar: 126–127
- Iranian calendar: 504–505
- Islamic calendar: 519–520
- Japanese calendar: Tenji 3 / Daiji 1 (大治元年)
- Javanese calendar: 1031–1032
- Julian calendar: 1126; MCXXVI
- Korean calendar: 3459
- Minguo calendar: 786 before ROC 民前786年
- Nanakshahi calendar: −342
- Seleucid era: 1437/1438 AG
- Thai solar calendar: 1668–1669
- Tibetan calendar: ཤིང་མོ་སྦྲུལ་ལོ་ (female Wood-Snake); 1252 or 871 or 99 — to — མེ་ཕོ་རྟ་ལོ་ (male Fire-Horse); 1253 or 872 or 100

Battle of Chlumec, by Adolf Liebscher

Year 1126 (MCXXVI) was a common year starting on Friday of the Julian calendar.

== Events ==
=== By place ===
==== Byzantine Empire ====
- Summer – Emperor John II Komnenos re-confirms the treaty of 1082. This ends the hostilities with Hungary and Venice. John secures Braničevo, and recovers the region of Sirmium on the Danube, but is forced by Venice to renew the exclusive commercial privileges.

==== Levant ====
- Spring – The Crusaders under Pons, count of Tripoli, attack the fortress of Rafaniya (once held by Pons' grandfather Raymond IV), which dominates the entry of the Buqaia from the Orontes Valley. They besiege the fortress for 18 days and capture it on March 31.
- Autumn – Bohemond II takes over his inheritance of the Principality of Antioch. He sails from Otranto with a Norman fleet of 24 ships, carrying a number of troops and horses. Bohemond lands at the port of St. Symeon early in October and is welcomed at Antioch.

==== Europe ====
- February 18 – Battle of Chlumec: Duke Soběslav I defeats a German army under King Lothair III and his Moravian ally, Duke Otto II the Black. Soběslav becomes the head of the Bohemian Principality.
- March 8 – Queen Urraca of León ("the Reckless") dies after a 17-year reign. She is succeeded by her 21-year-old son Alfonso VII el Emperador who becomes king of León (until 1157).
- Ragnvald Knaphövde, pretender to the Swedish throne, is killed by upset peasants at a local thing. Sweden is without a ruler, but Magnus Nielsen ("the Strong") claims sovereignty over Götaland.
- Summer – King Alfonso the Battler of Aragon and Navarre launches a campaign raid into Granada in Andalusia (modern Spain) against the Almoravids. In the aftermath, the Almoravid deport Jews and Christians from Andalusia to Morocco.
- Winter – King Lothair III makes Henry X ("the Proud"), duke of Bavaria to succeed his late father, Henry IX ("the Black"), who has died on December 13.

==== Britain ====
- Shrewsbury Castle is granted by King Henry I to his second wife, Queen Adeliza of Louvain (or Adelicia). The command of the castle is given to William FitzAlan.
- Rutherglen (located in South Lanarkshire) becomes one of the first of the Royal Burghs in Scotland.

==== Asia ====
- Spring – In China, scholars and farmers demonstrate around the capital city of Kaifeng, for the restoration of a trusted military official, Li Gang (李綱). Small conflicts erupt between the protestors and the government.
- January 18 – Emperor Hui Zong of the Song dynasty abdicates in favour of his eldest son, Qin Zong after a 24-year reign. Hui Zong assumes the honorary title of Taishang Huang (or "Retired Emperor").
- Jin–Song War: Jurchen forces reach the Yellow River Valley, two days after New Year. Remnants of the court flee south, including much of the populace, and communities such as the Kaifeng Jews.
- January 31 – Jurchen forces lay siege to Kaifeng. Qin Zong negotiates the terms of surrender, agreeing an annual indemnity. He orders Song forces to defend the prefectures of the Northern Song.

=== By topic ===
==== Literature ====
- Adelard of Bath, an English philosopher, translates Muḥammad ibn Mūsā al-Khwārizmī's arithmetic and astronomical works into Latin.
- Two previously written Chinese pharmaceutical works, one by Shen Kuo and one by Su Shi, are combined into one written work.

==== Religion ====
- Olegarius, archbishop of Tarragona, creates a community of knights (known as the "Confraternity of Tarragona"), to combat the Almoravids in Catalonia.

== Births ==
- Abu Madyan, Andalusian mystic and Sufi master (d. 1198)
- Averroes ibn Rushd, Andalusian judge and physician (d. 1198)
- Eynion de Tilston, Norman knight and lord of Tilston (approximate date)
- Fan Chengda, Chinese politician, poet and geographer (d. 1193)
- Michael the Syrian ("the Great"), Syriac patriarch (d. 1199)
- Mieszko III the Old, duke of Greater Poland (d. 1202)
- Muneko, Japanese princess and empress (d. 1189)
- Peter I of Courtenay, French nobleman (d. 1183)
- Sibylla of Burgundy, queen of Sicily (d. 1150)
- Sviatoslav III, Grand Prince of Kiev (d. 1194)
- Taira no Tokiko, Japanese Buddhist nun (d. 1185)

== Deaths ==
- February 10 –
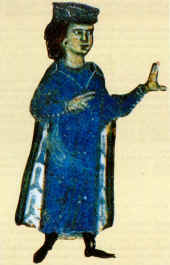
  William IX of Aquitaine (b. 1070s)
- February 18 – Otto II the Black, Moravian prince (b. 1085)
- March 8 – Urraca, queen regnant of León and Galicia (b. 1079)
- July 30 – Cecilia of Normandy (or Cecily), English princess
- September 1 – Świętosława of Poland, queen of Bohemia
- October 1 – Morphia of Melitene, queen of Jerusalem (or 1127)
- December 4 – Omar Khayyam, Persian mathematician (b. 1048)
- December 13 – Henry IX the Black, duke of Bavaria (b. 1075)
- December 29 – Wulfhilde of Saxony, duchess of Bavaria (b. 1072)
- Abu Bakr al-Turtushi, Andalusian political philosopher (b. 1059)
- Abu Nasr Ahmad ibn Fadl, Seljuk ruler (vizier) of Damascus
- Ahmad Ghazali, Persian mystic and writer (approximate date)
- Al-Tutili ("Blind Poet of Tudela"), Andalusian Muwallad poet
- Bertrand of Comminges, French bishop and saint (b. 1050)
- Cai Jing, Chinese politician and calligrapher (b. 1047)
- Edgar the Ætheling, uncrowned king of England (b. c. 1052)
- Ekkehard of Aura, German abbot, chronicler and writer
- Ragnvald Knaphövde, Swedish pretender (approximate date)
- Tong Guan, Chinese general and political adviser (b. 1054)
- Vikramaditya VI, king of the Western Chalukya Empire
- Waleran of Le Puiset, French nobleman (approximate date)
- Wynebald de Ballon, Norman nobleman (b. 1058)
