= 949 =

Calendar year

949 in various calendars
- Gregorian calendar: 949; CMXLIX
- Ab urbe condita: 1702
- Armenian calendar: 398; ԹՎ ՅՂԸ
- Assyrian calendar: 5699
- Balinese saka calendar: 870–871
- Bengali calendar: 355–356
- Berber calendar: 1899
- Buddhist calendar: 1493
- Burmese calendar: 311
- Byzantine calendar: 6457–6458
- Chinese calendar: 戊申年 (Earth Monkey); 3646 or 3439 — to — 己酉年 (Earth Rooster); 3647 or 3440
- Coptic calendar: 665–666
- Discordian calendar: 2115
- Ethiopian calendar: 941–942
- Hebrew calendar: 4709–4710
- Hindu calendars
- Vikram Samvat: 1005–1006
- Shaka Samvat: 870–871
- Kali Yuga: 4049–4050
- Holocene calendar: 10949
- Iranian calendar: 327–328
- Islamic calendar: 337–338
- Japanese calendar: Tenryaku 3 (天暦３年)
- Javanese calendar: 849–850
- Julian calendar: 949; CMXLIX
- Korean calendar: 3282
- Minguo calendar: 963 before ROC 民前963年
- Nanakshahi calendar: −519
- Seleucid era: 1260/1261 AG
- Thai solar calendar: 1491–1492
- Tibetan calendar: ས་ཕོ་སྤྲེ་ལོ་ (male Earth-Monkey); 1075 or 694 or −78 — to — ས་མོ་བྱ་ལོ་ (female Earth-Bird); 1076 or 695 or −77

Year 949 (CMXLIX) was a common year starting on Monday of the Julian calendar. It was the 949th year of the Common Era (CE) and Anno Domini (AD) designations, the 949th year of the 1st millennium, the 49th year of the 10th century, and the 10th and last year of the 940s decade.

== Events ==
=== By place ===
==== Byzantine Empire ====
- Arab-Byzantine War: Hamdanid forces under Sayf al-Dawla raid into the theme of Lykandos, but are defeated. The Byzantines counter-attack and seize Germanikeia, defeating an army from Tarsus, and raiding as far south as Antioch. General (strategos) Theophilos Kourkouas captures Theodosiopolis (modern-day Erzurum) after a 7-month siege.

==== Europe ====
- A Byzantine expeditionary force under Constantine Gongyles attempts to re-conquer the Emirate of Crete from the Saracens. The expedition ends in a disastrous failure; the Byzantine camp is destroyed in a surprise attack. Gongyles himself barely escapes on his flagship.
- Abd al-Rahman III the Caliph of Córdoba declares Jihad, preparing a large army & conquers the city of Lugo in the extreme North of Iberia. This raid shows to be one of the furthest raids Muslims in Spain ever conducted, done as a show of strength of the Muslim State in Al-Andalus.
- King Miroslav (or Miroslaus) is killed by Ban Pribina during a civil war started by his younger brother Michael Krešimir II, who succeeds him as ruler of Croatia.
- Summer – The Hungarians defeat a Bavarian army at Laa (modern Austria).

==== Japan ====
- September 14 – Fujiwara no Tadahira, a politician and chancellor (kampaku), dies at his native Kyoto. Having governed Japan as regent under Emperor Suzaku since 930. The Fujiwara clan will continue to hold the regency until 1180, controlling the imperial government.

== Births ==
- Fujiwara no Nagatō, Japanese bureaucrat and poet (d. 1009)
- Gebhard of Constance, German bishop (d. 995)
- Máel Sechnaill mac Domnaill, High King of Ireland (d. 1022)
- Mathilde, German abbess and granddaughter of Otto I (d. 1011)
- Ranna, Kannada poet (India) (approximate date)
- Symeon (the New Theologian), Byzantine monk and poet (d. 1022)
- Uma no Naishi, Japanese nobleman and waka poet (d. 1011)

== Deaths ==
- June 1 – Godfrey, Frankish nobleman (approximate date)
- August 17 – Li Shouzhen, Chinese general and governor
- September 14 – Fujiwara no Tadahira, Japanese statesman and regent (b. 880)
- September/October – Abdallah ibn al-Mustakfi, Abbasid caliph (b. 905)

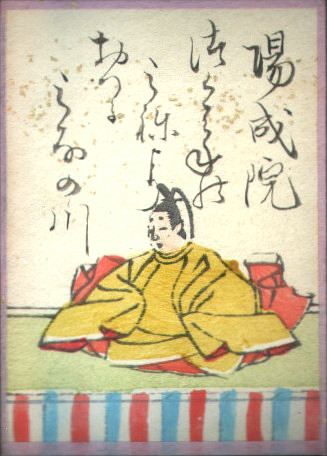
Emperor Yozei

- December – Imad al-Dawla, founder of the Buyid dynasty (Iran)
- December 2 – Odo of Wetterau, German nobleman
- December 10 – Herman I, duke of Swabia
- date unknown
  - An, Chinese imperial consort (Five Dynasties)
  - Eadric, ealdorman of Wessex (approximate date)
  - Jeongjong, king of Goryeo (Korea) (b. 923)
  - Miroslav (or Miroslaus), king of Croatia
  - Xiao Han, general of the Khitan Liao dynasty
  - Yunmen Wenyan, Chinese Zen Buddhist monk
  - Zhao Tingyin, general of Later Shu (b. 883)
