= 1148 =

1148 in various calendars
- Gregorian calendar: 1148; MCXLVIII
- Ab urbe condita: 1901
- Armenian calendar: 597; ԹՎ ՇՂԷ
- Assyrian calendar: 5898
- Balinese saka calendar: 1069–1070
- Bengali calendar: 554–555
- Berber calendar: 2098
- English Regnal year: 13 Ste. 1 – 14 Ste. 1
- Buddhist calendar: 1692
- Burmese calendar: 510
- Byzantine calendar: 6656–6657
- Chinese calendar: 丁卯年 (Fire Rabbit); 3845 or 3638 — to — 戊辰年 (Earth Dragon); 3846 or 3639
- Coptic calendar: 864–865
- Discordian calendar: 2314
- Ethiopian calendar: 1140–1141
- Hebrew calendar: 4908–4909
- Hindu calendars
- Vikram Samvat: 1204–1205
- Shaka Samvat: 1069–1070
- Kali Yuga: 4248–4249
- Holocene calendar: 11148
- Igbo calendar: 148–149
- Iranian calendar: 526–527
- Islamic calendar: 542–543
- Japanese calendar: Kyūan 4 (久安４年)
- Javanese calendar: 1054–1055
- Julian calendar: 1148; MCXLVIII
- Korean calendar: 3481
- Minguo calendar: 764 before ROC 民前764年
- Nanakshahi calendar: −320
- Seleucid era: 1459/1460 AG
- Thai solar calendar: 1690–1691
- Tibetan calendar: མེ་མོ་ཡོས་ལོ་ (female Fire-Hare); 1274 or 893 or 121 — to — ས་ཕོ་འབྲུག་ལོ་ (male Earth-Dragon); 1275 or 894 or 122

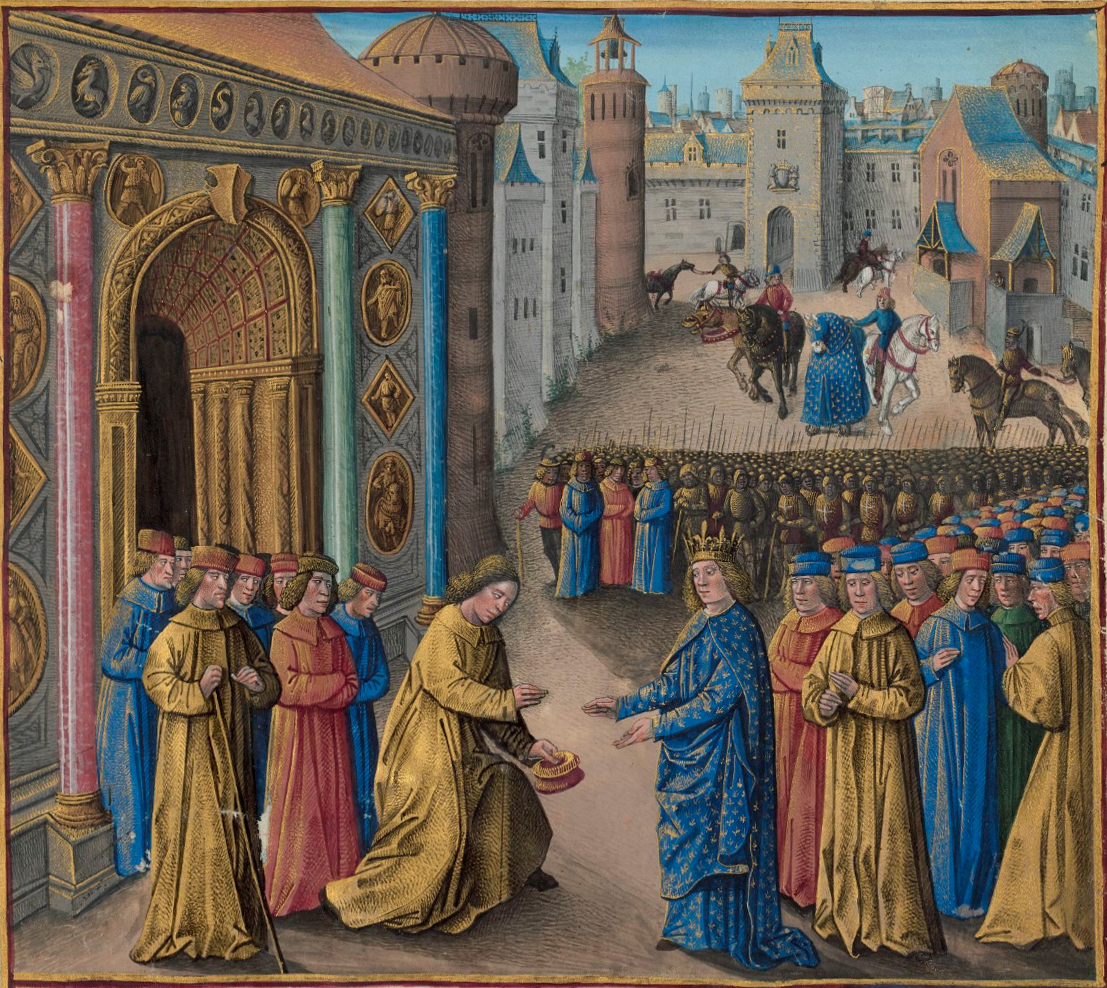
Raymond of Poitiers welcoming King Louis VII of France (right) in Antioch.

Year 1148 (MCXLVIII) was a leap year starting on Thursday of the Julian calendar.

== Events ==
=== By place ===
==== Second Crusade ====
- January 1 – The French crusaders under King Louis VII defeat a Turkish ambush next to the Meander River. Three days later they arrive at Laodicea – passing the spot where the German contingent led by Otto of Freising had been so disastrously ambushed (see 1147). The Crusaders are badly mauled as they cross Mount Cadmus (around January 8) before reaching Adalia on January 20.
- January 8 – Battle of Mount Cadmus: The French crusaders under Louis VII are defeated by the Seljuk Turks. The vanguard led by Geoffrey de Rancon ignores orders to pause and moves too far ahead, losing touch with the main army. The French are attacked by the Turks with the baggage train (almost 10 km long) unprotected. Louis is able to escape the fray under cover of the darkness.
- March – The French crusaders are left in Adalia; lack of available shipping obliges Louis VII to divide his forces – the knights and best troops accompany him to St. Symeon. Large numbers of pilgrims and non-combatants try to continue along the coastal road. Continually harassed by the Turks many French and Germans are killed. Less than half of them arrive in the late spring at Antioch.
- March 7 – King Conrad III recovers from his wounds and leaves Constantinople with his household. He is well supplied with money by Emperor Manuel I Komnenos and uses these funds to recruit pilgrims to augment the forces that remain to him. Conrad and his re-equipped Crusaders sail with a Byzantine fleet to Palestine. The fleet is scattered by storms and lands in different ports.
- March 19 – Louis VII and his wife, Queen Eleanor of Aquitaine, are welcomed at St. Symeon by Eleanor's uncle Raymond of Poitiers and all his household. Raymond escorts the French crusaders to Antioch, where for the next days festivities are held. He urges Louis to accompany him on an expedition against Aleppo but Louis refuses and prefers instead to finish his pilgrimage to Jerusalem.
- April – Southern French crusaders under Alfonso Jordan of Toulouse arrive by sea at Acre. Alfonso dies suddenly at Caesarea, resulting in the accusation that he has been poisoned by Count Raymond II of Tripoli. Most of the Provençal forces turn back and return home. Meanwhile, an unknown proportion of northern European naval crusaders (from England and Germany) arrive at Acre.
- April–May – Louis VII and the French crusaders remain in Antioch, but there are rumours of an incestuous affair between Eleanor of Aquitaine and Raymond of Poitiers. Louis, alarmed for his honour, departs with his army to Jerusalem in late May. Meanwhile, Conrad III with his chief nobleman are welcomed by Queen Melisende and her 18-year-old son, co-ruler Baldwin III at Jerusalem.
- June – Mu'in ad-Din Unur, Seljuk ruler (atabeg) of Damascus, prepares for war and strengthens the fortifications of the city. He sends an urgent request for military assistance to the Zangid ruler Sayf al-Din. Unur orders his troops to destroy the water sources in areas that the Crusaders must cross. Seljuk governors of frontier provinces station scouting parties along the road to Damascus.
- June 24 – Council of Acre: Conrad III, Louis VII, Melisende and many other nobles join in a war council near Acre. They decide that Damascus rather than Edessa will be the primary target of the Second Crusade.
- July – The Crusaders under Baldwin III join forces with the Crusader armies of Louis VII and Conrad III (all together some 50,000 men) at Tiberias. They march up the Jordan Valley and cross into Zangid territory.
- July 24 – Zangid forces under Sayf al-Din arrive at Homs. Mu'in al-Din Unur sends a letter of ultimatum to the Crusader leaders to lift the siege of Damascus. Meanwhile, guerrilla attacks demoralise the Crusaders.
- July 28 – Siege of Damascus: The Crusaders are forced to withdraw from their siege of Damascus after only four days. First Conrad III, then the rest of the Crusader army, decides to retreat to Jerusalem.
- September – The French crusaders raid the province of Damascus, in reprisal for the failure of their siege. Mu'in al-Din Unur takes his forces to the Hawran to protect the harvest and its transport to Damascus.
- September 8 – Conrad III sails from Acre to Thessaloniki and forms an alliance with Manuel I against King Roger II of Sicily. During his visit Henry II, Duke of Austria ('Jasomirgott') marries Manuel's niece, Theodora Komnene.

==== Europe ====
- February 1 – A small Crusader fleet of Genoese and English ships sets sail from Lisbon for the Holy Land. The Anglo-Flemish Crusader fleet takes Oran.
- Siege of Tortosa: A multinational force under Ramon Berenguer IV besieges the Almoravid city of Tortosa. After a 7-month siege the garrison surrenders.
- King Afonso I ("the Great") of Portugal takes Abrantes from the Almoravids. Ramon Berenguer IV conquers the lower Ebro plain (between 1148–1149).

==== England ====
- October – Queen Matilda returns to Normandy, partially due to her difficulties with the Catholic Church. Without the support of Robert of Gloucester her personal fight for the English throne is over.

==== Seljuk Empire ====
- Battle of Ghazni: Ghurid forces under Sayf al-Din Suri defeat the Ghaznavid sultan Bahram-Shah and capture the capital Ghazni. Bahram-Shah is forced to flee to India.

==== Africa ====
- Taking advantage of internal strife and a famine episode, George of Antioch takes Mahdia (June 22), Susa (July 1) and Sfax (July 12) in Tunisia, in the name of Roger II.
- Following the uprising of other cities in the region of Meknes (modern Morocco) under al-Massati, the population of Ceuta rebels against the Almohads.

=== By topic ===
==== Literature ====
- Anna Komnene writes the Alexiad, a biography of her father, the late Emperor Alexios I Komnenos.

==== Religion ====
- Hildegard of Bingen founds a new monastery at Rupertsberg in the Rhine Valley near Bingen am Rhein.

==== Technology ====
- An Italian silk industry is started at Palermo by Roger II, who takes numbers of silk workers back from Greece.

== Births ==
- Béla III, king of Hungary and Croatia (d. 1196)
- Bohemond III ("the Child"), prince of Antioch (d. 1201)
- Galgano Guidotti, Italian knight and saint (d. 1181)
- Isabelle de Meulan, French noblewoman (d. 1220)
- Muhammad II, ruler of the Nizari Ismaili state (d. 1210)
- Ōe no Hiromoto, Japanese nobleman (d. 1225)
- Philippa of Antioch, princess of Antioch (d. 1178)
- Qiu Chuji, Chinese Taoist religious leader (d. 1227)
- Ugo Canefri, Italian knight and health worker (d. 1233)
- Urraca of Portugal, queen consort of León (d. 1211)

== Deaths ==
- January 3 – Anselm of St. Saba, English bishop
- January 6
  - Gilbert de Clare, 1st Earl of Pembroke (b. 1100)
  - William de Warenne, 3rd Earl of Surrey (b. 1119)
- January 24 – Ascelin (or Anselm), English bishop
- April 16
  - Robert de Bethune, bishop of Hereford
  - Roger de Clinton, bishop of Coventry
- August 21 – William II, count of Nevers (b. 1089)
- September 17 – Conan III, duke of Brittany (b. 1095)
- September 30 – Magnús Einarsson, Icelandic bishop
- November 2 – Malachy, Irish archbishop and saint (b. 1094)
- Abu Bakr ibn al-Arabi, Andalusian scholar (b. 1076)
- Alberic of Ostia, French cardinal-bishop (b. 1080)
- Alfonso Jordan, count of Toulouse (b. 1103)
- Amadeus III, count of Savoy and Maurienne
- Ari Thorgilsson, Icelandic chronicler (b. 1067)
- Hedwig of Gudensberg, German countess (b. 1098)
- Henry of Lausanne, French monk and preacher
- Mahaut of Albon, countess of Savoy (b. 1112)
- Reginald III (or Renaud), count of Burgundy
- Roger III, duke of Apulia and Calabria (b. 1118)
- Simon of Vermandois, French bishop (b. 1093)
- William of St. Thierry, French abbot and writer
- Wuzhu, Chinese prince, general and minister
- Ye Mengde, Chinese minister and poet (b. 1077)
