= 1011 =

Calendar year

1011 in various calendars
- Gregorian calendar: 1011; MXI
- Ab urbe condita: 1764
- Armenian calendar: 460; ԹՎ ՆԿ
- Assyrian calendar: 5761
- Balinese saka calendar: 932–933
- Bengali calendar: 417–418
- Berber calendar: 1961
- English Regnal year: N/A
- Buddhist calendar: 1555
- Burmese calendar: 373
- Byzantine calendar: 6519–6520
- Chinese calendar: 庚戌年 (Metal Dog); 3708 or 3501 — to — 辛亥年 (Metal Pig); 3709 or 3502
- Coptic calendar: 727–728
- Discordian calendar: 2177
- Ethiopian calendar: 1003–1004
- Hebrew calendar: 4771–4772
- Hindu calendars
- Vikram Samvat: 1067–1068
- Shaka Samvat: 932–933
- Kali Yuga: 4111–4112
- Holocene calendar: 11011
- Igbo calendar: 11–12
- Iranian calendar: 389–390
- Islamic calendar: 401–402
- Japanese calendar: Kankō 8 (寛弘８年)
- Javanese calendar: 913–914
- Julian calendar: 1011; MXI
- Korean calendar: 3344
- Minguo calendar: 901 before ROC 民前901年
- Nanakshahi calendar: −457
- Seleucid era: 1322/1323 AG
- Thai solar calendar: 1553–1554
- Tibetan calendar: ལྕགས་ཕོ་ཁྱི་ལོ་ (male Iron-Dog); 1137 or 756 or −16 — to — ལྕགས་མོ་ཕག་ལོ་ (female Iron-Boar); 1138 or 757 or −15

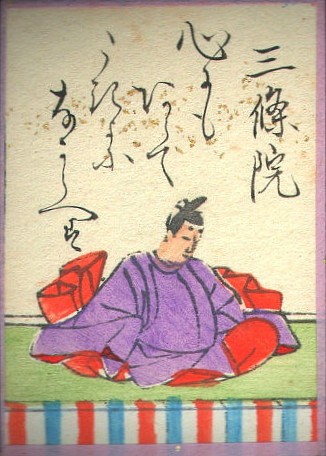
Emperor Sanjō of Japan (976–1017)

Year 1011 (MXI) was a common year starting on Monday of the Julian Calendar.

== Events ==
=== By place ===
==== Europe ====
- June 11 – Lombard Revolt: Mahmoud the Fat of Bari rises up against the Lombard rebels, led by Melus, and delivers the city to Basil Mesardonites, Byzantine governor (catepan) of the Catepanate of Italy. Melus is forced to flee to Salerno, and his brother-in-law Dattus escapes to Monte Cassino, but their families are taken captive, and carted off to Constantinople.
- Autumn – Basil Mesardonites visits Guaimar III of Salerno to secure his cooperation. Melus is forced to flee again. Basil proceeds to Monte Cassino – and persuades Abbot Atenulf to expel Dattus. Pope Sergius IV supports Dattus with papal troops, to garrison the tower on the Garigliano River, a fortified complex in the territory of the Duchy of Gaeta.
- King Henry II enfeoffs Adalbero with Carinthia (including the rule over the March of Verona) after the death of Duke Conrad I.
- The Grand Prince of Kyiv and ruler of Kievan Rus' Vladimir the Great laid the first foundations of Saint Sophia Cathedral, Kyiv.

==== England ====
- September 29 – Siege of Canterbury: Danish Viking raiders led by Thorkell the Tall pillage Canterbury after a siege, taking Ælfheah, archbishop of Canterbury, as a prisoner.
- Byrhtferth, Benedictine monk of Ramsey Abbey, writes his Manual (Enchiridion) on the divine order of the universe and time.

==== Middle East ====
- Ibn al-Haytham (Alhazen), an Arab scientist working in Egypt, feigns madness for fear of angering Caliph Al-Hakim bi-Amr Allah, and is kept under house arrest. During this time he begins writing his influential Book of Optics.
- The Baghdad Manifesto is ordered by Caliph Al-Qadir of the Abbasid Caliphate, in response to the growth of the Fatimid-supporting Ismaili sect of Islam within his borders.

==== Asia ====
- Emperor Ichijō abdicates the throne and dies later after a 25-year reign. He is succeeded by his cousin Sanjō as the 67th emperor of Japan.
- In Vietnam, emperor Lý Thái Tổ personally led a campaign to conquer the Cử Long barbarians. The campaign was a success for the emperor, all the barbarians' camps were burned, and their leaders were brought before the royal court.

== Births ==
- Jōjin, Japanese Tendai monk (d. 1081)
- Ralph the Staller, English nobleman (d. 1068)
- Robert I (the Old), duke of Burgundy (d. 1076)
- Shao Yong, Chinese philosopher and cosmologist (d. 1077)
- Yaghi Siyan, Seljuk governor of Antioch (d. 1098)

== Deaths ==
- February 9 – Bernard I, German nobleman
- February 23 – Willigis, archbishop of Mainz
- July 25 – Ichijō, emperor of Japan (b. 980)
- November 5 – Mathilde, German abbess (b. 949)
- November 21 – Reizei, emperor of Japan (b. 950)
- Abu Ali Hasan Ibn Ustadh-Hurmuz, Buyid general
- Albert I, count of Namur (approximate date)
- Anna Porphyrogenita, Grand Princess of Kiev
- Boniface, Italian nobleman (approximate date)
- Conrad I, duke of Carinthia (approximate date)
- Mahendradatta, queen of Bali (b. 961)
- Muhammad ibn Suri, Ghurid ruler (malik)
- Sumbat III, Georgian prince of Tao-Klarjeti
- Uma no Naishi, Japanese waka poet (b. 949)

== Sources ==
- Norwich, John Julius (1967). The Normans in the South 1016–1130. Longmans. ISBN 978-0582107519.
- Palmer, Alan; Palmer, Veronica (1992). Chronology of British History. London: Century Ltd / Barrie & Jenkins. pp. 48–49. ISBN 978-0712656160.
- Toumanoff, C. (1967). Studies in Christian Caucasian History. Washington D. C.: Georgetown University Press. p. 498. OCLC 901879629.
