= 1020 =

Calendar year

1020 in various calendars
- Gregorian calendar: 1020; MXX
- Ab urbe condita: 1773
- Armenian calendar: 469; ԹՎ ՆԿԹ
- Assyrian calendar: 5770
- Balinese saka calendar: 941–942
- Bengali calendar: 426–427
- Berber calendar: 1970
- English Regnal year: N/A
- Buddhist calendar: 1564
- Burmese calendar: 382
- Byzantine calendar: 6528–6529
- Chinese calendar: 己未年 (Earth Goat); 3717 or 3510 — to — 庚申年 (Metal Monkey); 3718 or 3511
- Coptic calendar: 736–737
- Discordian calendar: 2186
- Ethiopian calendar: 1012–1013
- Hebrew calendar: 4780–4781
- Hindu calendars
- Vikram Samvat: 1076–1077
- Shaka Samvat: 941–942
- Kali Yuga: 4120–4121
- Holocene calendar: 11020
- Igbo calendar: 20–21
- Iranian calendar: 398–399
- Islamic calendar: 410–411
- Japanese calendar: Kannin 4 (寛仁４年)
- Javanese calendar: 922–923
- Julian calendar: 1020; MXX
- Korean calendar: 3353
- Minguo calendar: 892 before ROC 民前892年
- Nanakshahi calendar: −448
- Seleucid era: 1331/1332 AG
- Thai solar calendar: 1562–1563
- Tibetan calendar: ས་མོ་ལུག་ལོ་ (female Earth-Sheep); 1146 or 765 or −7 — to — ལྕགས་ཕོ་སྤྲེ་ལོ་ (male Iron-Monkey); 1147 or 766 or −6

Year 1020 (MXX) was a leap year starting on Friday of the Julian calendar.

== Events ==
- Summer – Emperor Henry II conducts his third Italian military campaign. He makes plans to invade the south, but remains non-committal.
- June 15 – Byzantine troops under Catepan Basil Boioannes (supported by his ally Prince Pandulf IV) capture the fortress of Troia.
- The French city of Saint-Germain-en-Laye is founded by King Robert II (the Pious).
- King Canute the Great codifies the laws of England (approximate date).
- King Gagik I of Armenia is succeeded by Hovhannes-Smbat III.

== Births ==
- Almodis de la Marche, French noblewoman (d. 1071)
- Beatrice of Bar, French duchess and regent (d. 1076)
- Benno II, German bishop and architect (approximate date)
- Bernard of Menthon, French priest and saint (d. 1081)
- Conrad I (or Cuno), duke of Bavaria (approximate date)
- Filarete of Calabria, Sicilian saint (approximate date)
- Gonzalo Sánchez, Spanish nobleman (approximate date)
- Gunhilda of Denmark, German queen (approximate date)
- Guo Xi, Chinese landscape painter (approximate date)
- Hallvard Vebjørnsson, Norwegian saint (approximate date)
- Kunigunde of Altdorf, German noblewoman (approximate date)
- Maria of Gaeta, Italian noblewoman (approximate date)
- Osbern Giffard, Norman nobleman (approximate date)
- Otto of Nordheim, duke of Bavaria (approximate date)
- Stephen IX, pope of the Catholic Church (approximate date)
- Su Song, Chinese statesman and scientist (d. 1101)
- Sweyn Godwinson, English nobleman (approximate date)
- Vladimir Yaroslavich, Grand Prince of Kiev (d. 1052)
- William I (the Great), count of Burgundy (d. 1087)
- William Busac, English nobleman (jure uxoris) (d. 1076)
- William FitzOsbern, 1st Earl of Hereford (approximate date)
- William of Poitiers, French priest and writer (d. 1090)
- Wulfhild of Norway, duchess consort of Saxony (d. 1071)
- Zhang Zai, Chinese philosopher and cosmologist (d. 1077)

== Deaths ==
- June 12 – Lyfing, archbishop of Canterbury
- June 15 – Dattus (or Datto), Lombard rebel leader
- August 16 – Zhou Huaizheng, Chinese eunuch
- Al-Mu'ayyad Ahmad, Muslim imam (b. 944)
- Al-Sijzi, Persian mathematician (approximate date)
- Bernard I (Taillefer), Spanish nobleman
- Bouchard II (the Bearded), French nobleman (b. 975)
- Einar Sigurdsson, Norse Viking nobleman
- Ferdowsi, Persian poet and author (b. 940)
- Gagik I, king of Bagratid Armenia (approximate date)
- Gerald I (Tranche-Lion), French nobleman
- Gojslav, king of Croatia (approximate date)
- Leif Ericson, Norse Viking explorer (approximate date)
- Melus of Bari, Lombard nobleman and rebel leader
- Radim Gaudentius, Polish archbishop (b. 970)
- Stephen I of Vermandois, French nobleman
- Trdat the Architect, Armenian chief architect
