= Diocese of Rochester =

Diocese of Rochester can refer to several topics:

- Anglican Diocese of Rochester, a diocese of the Church of England
- Episcopal Diocese of Rochester, a diocese of the Episcopal Church in the United States
- Roman Catholic Diocese of Rochester, a diocese of the Catholic Church located in New York, United States
- Diocese of Winona-Rochester, a diocese of the Catholic Church located in Minnesota, United States
