= 1027 =

Calendar year

1027 in various calendars
Gregorian calendar	1027; MXXVII
Ab urbe condita	1780
Armenian calendar	476; ԹՎ ՆՀԶ
Assyrian calendar	5777
Balinese saka calendar	948–949
Bengali calendar	433–434
Berber calendar	1977
English Regnal year	N/A
Buddhist calendar	1571
Burmese calendar	389
Byzantine calendar	6535–6536
Chinese calendar	丙寅年 (Fire Tiger); 3724 or 3517 — to — 丁卯年 (Fire Rabbit); 3725 or 3518
Coptic calendar	743–744
Discordian calendar	2193
Ethiopian calendar	1019–1020
Hebrew calendar	4787–4788
- Hindu calendars
Vikram Samvat	1083–1084
Shaka Samvat	948–949
Kali Yuga	4127–4128
Holocene calendar	11027
Igbo calendar	27–28
Iranian calendar	405–406
Islamic calendar	417–418
Japanese calendar	Manju 4 (万寿４年)
Javanese calendar	929–930
Julian calendar	1027; MXXVII
Korean calendar	3360
Minguo calendar	885 before ROC 民前885年
Nanakshahi calendar	−441
Seleucid era	1338/1339 AG
Thai solar calendar	1569–1570
Tibetan calendar	མེ་ཕོ་སྟག་ལོ་ (male Fire-Tiger); 1153 or 772 or 0 — to — མེ་མོ་ཡོས་ལོ་ (female Fire-Hare); 1154 or 773 or 1

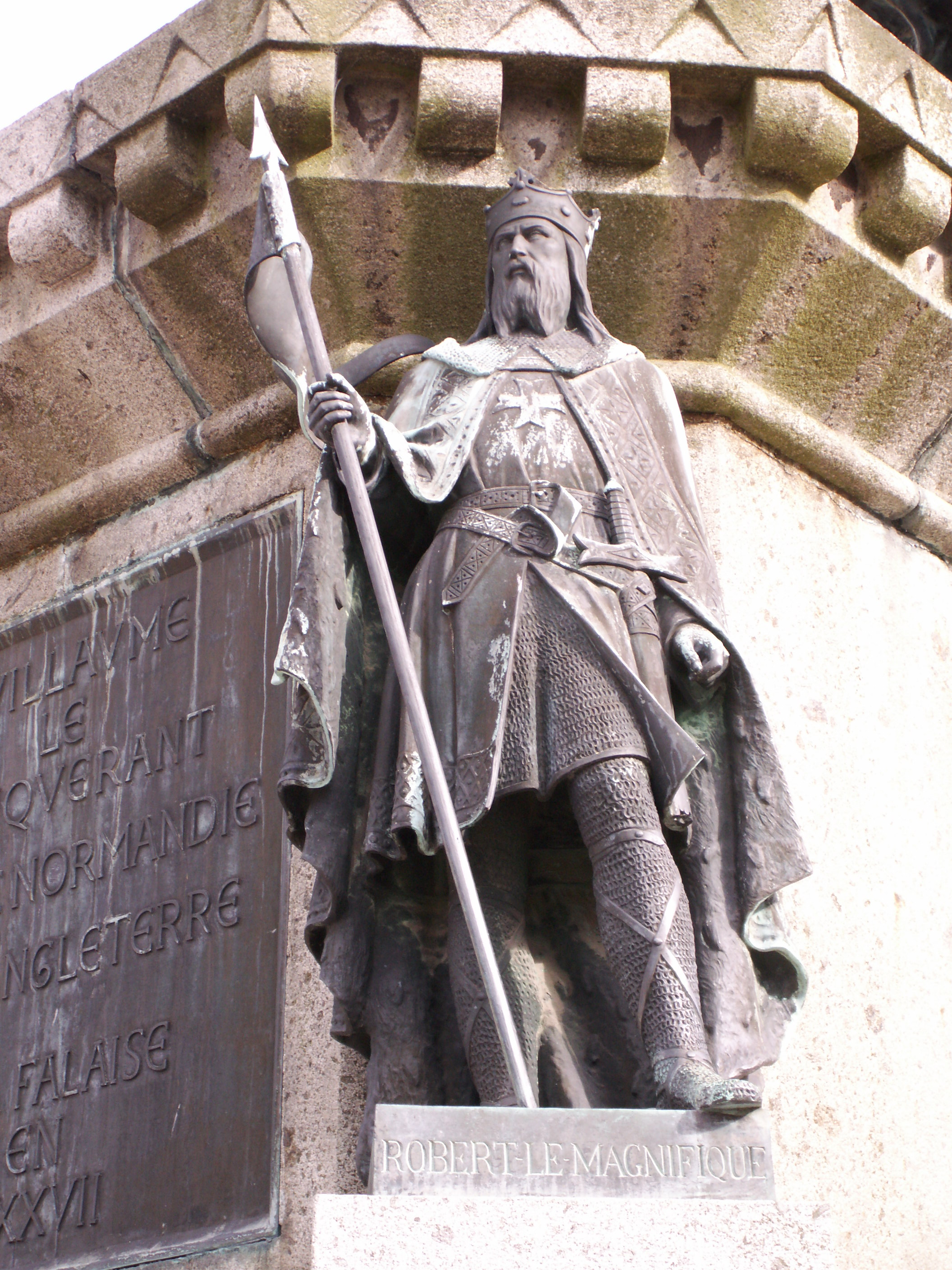
Robert the Magnificent (1000–1035)

Year 1027 (MXXVII) was a common year starting on Sunday of the Julian calendar.

== Events ==
=== By Place ===
==== Europe ====
- March 26 – Pope John XIX crowns Conrad II ("the Elder") and his wife Gisela of Swabia as Holy Roman Emperor and Empress, respectively, in Old St. Peter's Basilica in Rome. Cnut the Great, King of Denmark and England, attends the coronation, proving his position as sole ruler of the Danish North Sea Empire.
- May 14 – King Robert II of France ("the Pious") sues for peace with his sons. Henry I is crowned co-king of France at Reims Cathedral, but has little power to rule (until 1031).
- August 6 – Robert the Magnificent becomes duke of Normandy after the death of his brother Richard III.
- Duke Sergius IV of Naples donates the County of Aversa to a band of Norman mercenaries led by Rainulf Drengot, who support him in the war with Capua.
- King Sigtrygg Silkbeard of Dublin and sub-King Flannacán of Brega make a pilgrimage to Rome.
- Ealdred is appointed abbot of Tavistock Abbey in England (approximate date).

==== Asia ====
- August 16 – Bagrat IV becomes king of Georgia on the death of his father, George I. Queen Dowager Mariam becomes regent for her 9-year-old son.
- Wedding of Crown Prince Atsunaga of Japan and Imperial Princess Teishi.
- This is the first year of the first rabjyung (60-year) cycle to start in the Tibetan calendar.

=== By topic ===
==== Science, technology and medicine ====
- The Book of Healing (Arabic: کتاب الشفاء Kitab Al-Shifaʾ, Latin: Sufficientia), a comprehensive scientific and philosophical encyclopedia written by the Persian polymath Avicenna (Abū ʿAlī ibn Sīnā), is published.
- Song dynasty Chinese engineer Yan Su reinvents the 3rd-century south-pointing chariot, a mechanical-driven compass vehicle (as recorded in the Song Shi).

== Births ==
- January 19 – Shōshi, Japanese empress consort (d. 1105)
- Albert III, count of Namur (House of Namur) (approximate date)
- Al-Mu'tamid ibn Abbad, Abbadid ruler of Seville (d. 1095)
- Ernest the Brave, margrave of Austria (d. 1075)
- Fayun Faxiu, Chinese Chan Buddhist monk (d. 1090)
- Matilda of Franconia, German princess (d. 1034)
- Sviatoslav II, Grand Prince of Kiev (d. 1077)
- Ulrich I (or Udalrich), German bishop (d. 1121)

== Deaths ==
- January 3 – Fujiwara no Yukinari, Japanese calligrapher (b. 972)
- August 6 – Richard III, duke of Normandy (House of Normandy)
- August 16 – George I, king of Georgia (House of Bagrationi)
- October 16 – Fujiwara no Kenshi, Japanese dowager empress (b. 994)
- Abu'l-Qasim al-Husayn ibn Ali al-Maghribi, Arab statesman (b. 981)
- Aurelia of Regensburg, daughter of Hugh Capet and saint
- Dayang Jingxuan, Chinese Zen Buddhist monk (b. 943)
- Dogra mac Dúnadach, king of Síol Anmchadha (Ireland)
- Gadhra Mór mac Dundach, king of Uí Maine (Ireland)
- Hippolytus, archbishop of Gniezno (approximate date)
- Sulayman al-Ghazzi, Arab poet and bishop of Gaza (approximate date)
- Walter of Speyer, German bishop and poet (b. 967)
- Yazid II, Persian ruler (shah) of Shirvan (Azerbaijan)
