= Ramihrdus of Cambrai =

Ramihrdus of Cambrai, a known priest who had been practicing his own sects of religion, was accused of heresy in 1076 or 1077 for being unwilling to accept communion from priests, including the bishop, after being summoned to court because he believed that the priesthood was corrupt. Although his refusal to accept the sacrament bears some resemblance to the Donatist heresy, which states that sacraments performed by corrupt priests are actually invalid, it was not clear at the time whether Ramihrdus should actually be condemned or not, since his refusal could also be interpreted in the context of Pope Gregory VII's contemporary attempt to reform the church, which included several initiatives directed towards the reform of the clergy.

However, an angry mob (unclear whether or not it was, in fact, priest, the locals of Cambrai, or even both) seized Ramihrdus from where he was being kept in a hut, after the clergy had been deliberating his circumstances of accusations against the corrupt priests, and burned him as a heretic.
