= Landulf (bishop of Pisa) =

Bishop of Pisa from 1077 to 1079

Landulf (died 25 October 1079) was the bishop of Pisa from the spring of 1077 until his death. His election marked a return to canon law in Pisa and he was consecrated by Pope Gregory VII. His election was also supported by Marchioness Matilda of Tuscany, who made a large donation to the canons of the cathedral during his episcopate.

On 1 September 1077, Pope Gregory appointed Landulf, then bishop-elect, the permanent legate of the Holy See in Corsica. On 16 September he sent a letter to all the clergy and laity of Corsica reminding them of the papal lordship over Corsica and informing them that he was sending Landulf to safeguard the rights of the Holy See there. On 30 November 1078, Gregory confirmed the canonicity of Landulf's election, promised papal protection to his diocese and extended the vicariate in Corsica to Landulf's successors.

At the Lenten synod held in Rome in 1079, the theologian Berengar of Tours, charged with heresy, accused Landulf and his fellow Italian bishop, Ulrich of Padua, of having convinced Pope Gregory to refuse to allow Berengar to prove his orthodoxy by an oath and an ordeal. Landulf and Ulrich prevailed on the synod to defer the issue to the next Lenten council.

== Sources ==
- Cowdrey, H. E. J. (1998). Pope Gregory VII, 1073–1085. Oxford: Clarendon Press.
- Radding, Charles; Newton, Francis (2003). Theology, Rhetoric, and Politics in the Eucharistic Controversy, 1078–1079: Alberic of Monte Cassio Against Berengar of Tours. New York: Columbia University Press.
