= Paul of Caen =

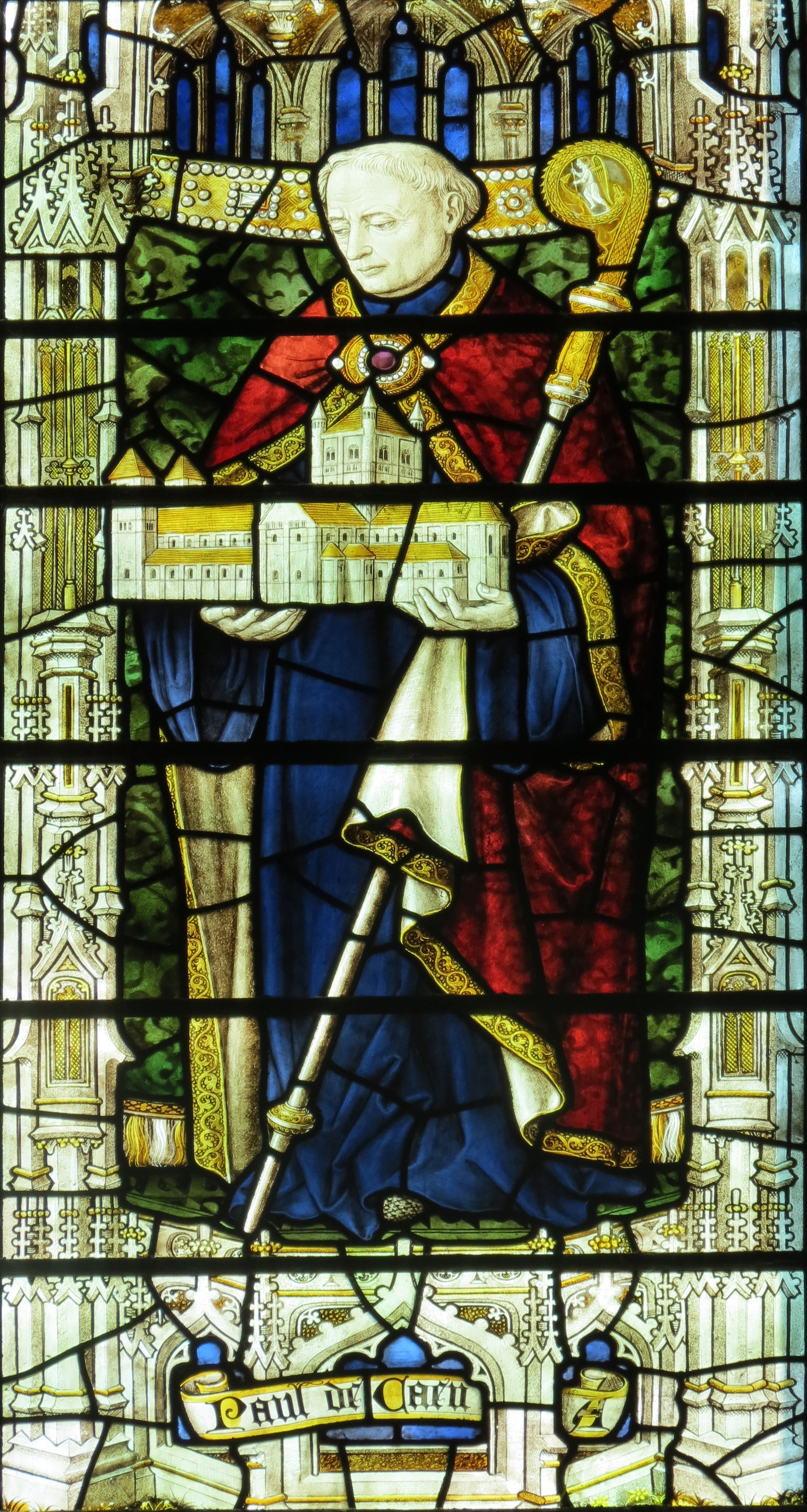
Paul of Caen on stained glass windows of Cathedral St-Albans.

Paul of Caen was a Norman Benedictine monk who became fourteenth Abbot of St Albans Abbey in 1077, a position he held to 1093. He was a nephew of Archbishop Lanfranc.

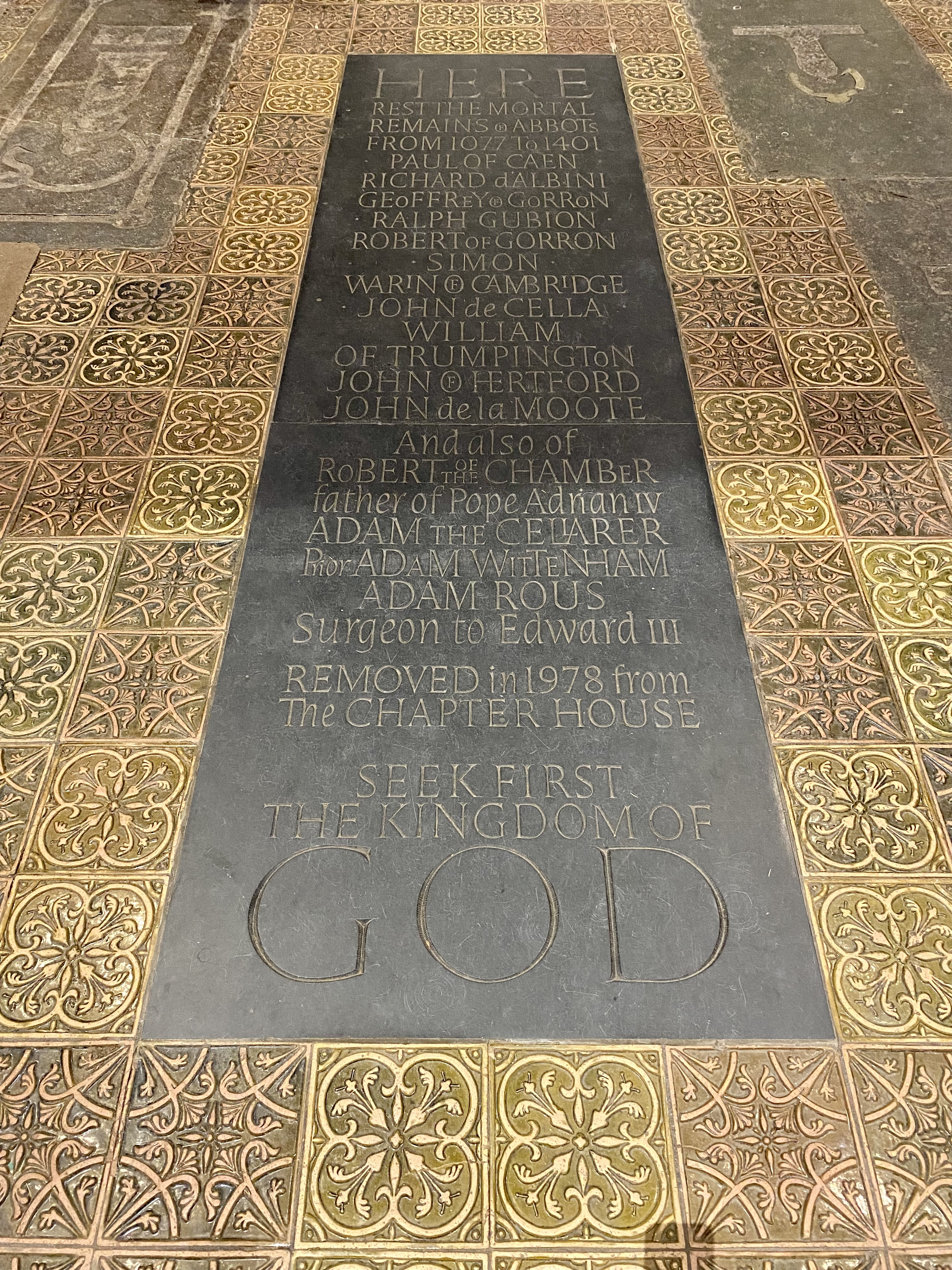
Stone marking the 1978 reburial of the remains of Paul of Caen and other Abbots of St Albans at St Albans Cathedral

Paul, former monk of the Saint-Étienne abbey in Caen, was an energetic builder at the Abbey, having materials from the ruins of Roman Verulamium, collected by earlier abbots Ealdred and Ealmer, to work with. He also took a firm line with older reverences, disregarding some Anglo-Saxon relics and tombs, and allowing the incorporation of older religious stonework into foundations, thus paradoxically ensuring their preservation for archaeology. He encouraged the transcription of manuscripts.
