= Secastilla =

Coordinates: 42°11′N 0°16′E

Secastilla (Spanish) Secastiella (Aragonese)
- municipality
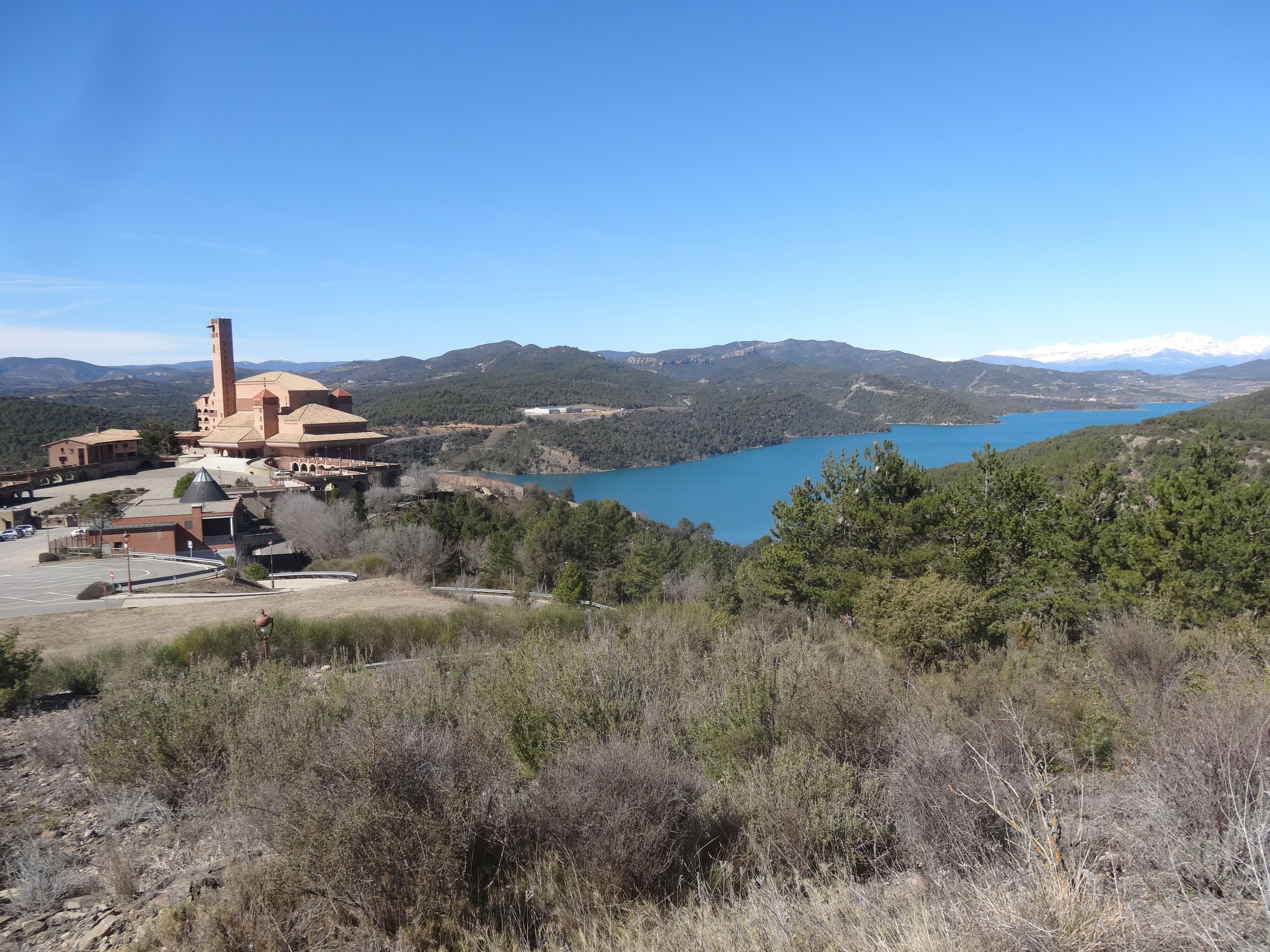

- Flag Coat of arms
- Interactive map of Secastilla (Spanish)
- Country: Spain
- Autonomous community: Aragon
- Province: Huesca
- Municipality: Secastilla/Secastella

Area
  - Total: 47 km^{2} (18 sq mi)
- Elevation: 612 m (2,008 ft)

Population (2025-01-01)
  - Total: 142
  - Density: 3.0/km^{2} (7.8/sq mi)
- Time zone: UTC+1 (CET)
  - Summer (DST): UTC+2 (CEST)

Secastilla (Spanish: [sekasˈtiʎa]), in Aragonese: Secastiella, is a municipality located in the province of Huesca, Aragon, Spain. According to the 2018 census (INE), the municipality has a population of 146 inhabitants.

== See also ==
- List of municipalities in Huesca
