= Allucio of Campugliano =

Italian Roman Catholic saint

Allucio of Campugliano (or Allucio da Pescia) (1070–1134) was a Tuscan holy man who distinguished himself by his work on behalf of pilgrims and the poor, and for peace. In the Roman Catholic Church his feast day is celebrated on 23 October.

Born in Valdinievole near Pescia to a well-to-do rural landowner, he spent his youth shepherding the family's flock before devoting his life to acts of charity. He built two churches, a bridge over the Arno, three hospices for pilgrims and other travellers, including one on his own property at Campigliano near Uzzano. He was a generous almsgiver. Later in his life he mediated between the Tuscan city-states, seeking to prevent conflicts that in later centuries would grow into open and continual war. He died at Valdinievole.

When Allucio's relics were being translated in 1344, a vita (biography) was discovered stored in the reliquary. According to the record of the proceedings organized by the clergy of Pescia, the work was "a legend about the life and what was said about the miracles of the holy Allucius written in one document" (legendam de vita et quibusdam miraculis dicti sancti Allucii in cartula pecuria scriptam). It was thought to be from the twelfth or thirteenth century.
