= Urban (bishop of Llandaff) =

12th-century Bishop of Llandaff

Urban (1076 – 1134) was the first bishop of South East Wales to call himself 'bishop of Llandaff'. He was of a Welsh clerical family and his baptismal name in the Welsh language is given in charter sources as Gwrgan. He Latinised it to the papal name 'Urban'.

== Early career ==
Urban came from one of the dominant Anglo-Welsh clerical dynasties of what was called in the eleventh century the diocese of Glamorgan. Two of his brothers are known: one called Caradoc the priest and the other, Gwrgan of Llancarfan. This would indicate that his family origins derived from the important clerical community of Llancarfan. The petition of the 'clergy and people' of Glamorgan in support of his election as bishop says that he had been consecrated priest in the English diocese of Worcester. This more than hints that Urban, as with several other known clerics from the southern Welsh dioceses, had been sent to England to be educated. He was already a leading cleric under his Anglo-Welsh predecessor, Bishop Herewald (1056–1104), occupying the office of archdeacon of Llandaff. At the time of his election as bishop in 1107 he was said to be thirty-one years of age, which if true would give a date of birth of 1076.

== Inventing the Diocese of Llandaff ==
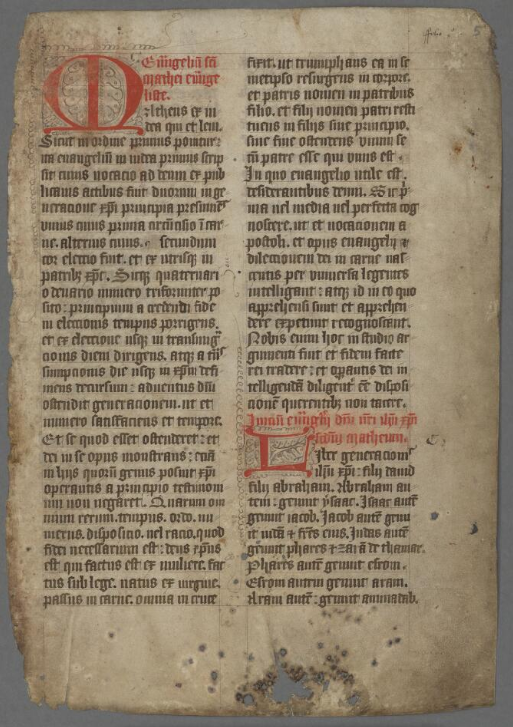
Liber Landavensis f.5

Urban was consecrated bishop 'of the church of Glamorgan which is to be found in Wales' on 11 August 1107 by Archbishop Anselm of Canterbury, making a profession of obedience to the archbishop at Canterbury. The contemporary chroniclers Eadmer and William of Malmesbury likewise call him bishop of Glamorgan. But between 1115 and 1119 Urban re-invented his diocese, taking the title of 'bishop of Llandaff' settling his see on the clerical community beside the river Taff, some miles north of the castle of Cardiff, the centre of political power in Glamorgan. Urban made great efforts to increase the prestige of Llandaff. With the permission of Gruffudd ap Cynan, king of Gwynedd, he translated the relics of St Dyfrig from Bardsey Island and reburied them at Llandaff. In April 1120, he began the reconstruction of the small church of the Llandaff community as a substantial Romanesque cathedral church, some impressive work from which still survives in the modern fabric. By that time Urban was at work on his master-plan, the compilation of a dossier of documents by which he could pursue some major territorial claims against the neighbouring dioceses.

== Bishop Urban and the Book of Llandaff ==
Urban's principal monument is the dossier he created to sustain the great cause he began in 1119 against the neighbouring dioceses of Hereford and St Davids, the Book of Llandaff, which was compiled between 1120 and 1134. He used as his primary source a large cache of early diplomas and charters relating to the episcopal communities of south east Wales, some dating back to the sub-Roman period. He or his clerks deliberately edited these to present a fictitious continuity of bishops of Llandaff from the sixth century onwards, back to the times of St Teilo, the original patron of the Llandaff community. Copied into the dossier were Lives of the Welsh saints associated with Llandaff (Teilo, Euddogwy and Dyfrig) which Urban commissioned. The Lives present the bishops of Llandaff as presiding as metropolitans over the other Welsh bishops. Authorship of the 'Book of Llandaff' has been attributed to several men. Geoffrey of Monmouth, Urban himself or the hagiographer, Caradoc of Llancarfan, have all been suggested, but the evidence for each can only be circumstantial.

== The appeal to Rome ==
The most remarkable and long-lasting legacy of Bishop Urban's career was the epic case he pursued at Rome against the neighbouring dioceses of St Davids and Hereford. The first complaints against St Davids had been made before the death of Bishop Wilfrid of St Davids (1115). It may have been that which inspired the collection of documents copied into the Book of Llandaff. The wider case opened at the Council of Reims in 1119 when Urban presented a petition to Pope Calixtus II, where he asserted the primacy of Llandaff over other Welsh dioceses, the persecution of his church by Welsh and Norman magnates and the depredations on his jurisdiction by neighbouring bishops. Urban received protections from the pope and the extent of his claims were registered. Papal letters were issued to King Henry I, Ralph archbishop of Canterbury and the clergy and barons of the diocese in Urban's support. In 1125 John of Crema, the papal legate, summoned the disputing parties to London to hear the case. The case was finally referred to Rome in 1127, and Urban travelled there in April 1128. Pope Honorius II decided provisionally in Urban's favour awarding substantial swathes of territory in Herefordshire and Deheubarth to Llandaff diocese. The archbishop of Canterbury's part in the affair was criticised by the curia. A further hearing at Rome in February 1129 heard the evidence of Welsh clergy and witnesses Urban had brought with him. Since the other parties did not appear, the case went to Urban by default. This brought the bishop of St Davids to Rome in 1130 to appeal against the decision. Urban's claims were increasingly obstructed both at the royal court and Canterbury. He found Pope Innocent II less helpful than his predecessors, when he met him at St-Quentin in 1131. In 1132, the pope referred the case to the archbishops of the Anglo-Norman realm for settlement, though reserving the final judgement to himself. Urban fought the case through several hearings in England in 1132 and 1133, and ultimately lost. Ill and aged now, Urban made a final journey to Rome, where he died early in October 1134. Though he lost, Urban's ambitions and energy radically changed the nature of the relationship between the papal curia and the church in England. Following Urban's epic legal battle, an increasing number of litigants appealed to Rome from decisions taken in English provincial courts.

== Sources ==
- J. R. Davies, The Book of Llandaf and the Norman Church in Wales (Woodbridge, 2003).
- J. R. Davies, "Liber Landavensis: its date and the identity of its editor", Cambrian Medieval Celtic Studies, 35 (Summer 1998), 1-11.
- W. Davies, "St Mary's Worcester and the Liber Landavensis", Journal of the Society of Archivists, 4 (1970/3), 459-85.
- W. Davies, The Llandaff Charters (Aberystwyth, 1977).
- Llandaff Episcopal Acta, 1140-1287, ed. D. Crouch (South Wales Record Society, 5, 1988).
- D. Crouch, "Urban, first bishop of Llandaff, 1107-1134", Journal of Welsh Ecclesiastical History, 6 (1989), 20-41.
- C. N. L. Brooke, "The Archbishops of St Davids, Llandaff and Caerleon-on-Usk", in, The Church and the Welsh Border in the Central Middle Ages (Woodbridge, 1986), 16-49.
- Yorke, Barbara (2006). The Conversion of Britain: Religion, Politics and Society in Britain c. 600-800. London: Pearson/Longman. ISBN 0-582-77292-3.
