= Ye Mengde =

Chinese scholar, poet and official (1077–1148)

Ye Mengde (Chinese: 葉夢得; Wade–Giles: Yeh Meng-te; 1077–1148) was a Song dynasty Chinese scholar, poet, and government minister.
