= 990s =

Decade

The 990s decade ran from January 1, 990, to December 31, 999.

== Events ==
=== 990 ===
==== By place ====
====== Europe ======
- Al-Mansur, Chancellor and effective ruler of Al-Andalus, conquers the Castle of Montemor-o-Velho (modern Portugal), expanding the Umayyad Caliphate of Córdoba.
- The city of Lund, Sweden is founded, during the reign of the Danish king Sweyn Forkbeard (approximate date).

====== Africa ======
- The Ghana Empire takes the Berber town of Aoudaghost (modern Mauritania) as the West African nation makes further gains.
- Construction of the Al-Hakim Mosque by orders of the Fatimid vizier Gawar Al-Siqilli begins in Cairo (modern Egypt).

==== By topic ====
====== Religion ======
- June – The Pax Ecclesiae, an edict by the Catholic Church, is promulgated. Held at three synods in different parts of southern and central France (at Charroux, Narbonne and Puy), it attempts to outlaw acts of war against non-combatants and the clergy.

=== 991 ===
- March 1: In Rouen, Pope John XV ratifies the first Truce of God, between Æthelred the Unready and Richard I of Normandy.
- March 29: Bishop Adalberon imprisons the treasonous Duke Charles of Lorraine and his nephew Arnulf, the Archbishop of Reims. Adalberon delivers the two men to King Hugh Capet, who imprisons them and their family in Orléans. The cities of Reims and Laon are returned to Capet.
- April 5: 991 Damascus earthquake in Syria: According to historian George Elmacin (13th century), the earthquake caused the fall of 1,000 houses in Damascus itself, and many people were trapped in their ruins and died. The village of Beglabec was reportedly engulfed, due to the earthquake.
- Spring: Byzantine Emperor Basil II begins a campaign against the Bulgarians.
- June 15: Theophanu dies in Nijmegen, and Adelaide of Italy assumes full regency over her grandson, Otto III.
- June 17 – 18: The royal council of Saint-Basle de Verzy is marked by opposition between the bishops and the monks. Gerbert d'Aurillac is elected as the deposed Arnulf's successor as the Archbishop of Reims, to the anger of Pope John XV, who had no involvement in the decision.
- August 11: Following a raid by Olaf Tryggvason at the mouth of the River Thames, ealdorman Byrhtnoth is killed in the Battle of Maldon in Essex, which is commemorated in the Old English poem The Battle of Maldon. Æthelred the Unready is forced to pay a tribute of 22,000 pounds of silver for Tryggvason to withdraw his troops; this is the first in a series of Danegelds.
- November 22: The beginning of the reign of al-Qadir, Abbasid caliph of Baghdad, under the tutelage of the Buyids and following the deposition of al-Ta'i.

==== Unknown dates ====
- Count Odo I of Blois, who captured Melun, is driven out of the city by the coalition of King Hugh Capet, Count Fulk III of Anjou and Richard I of Normandy; Odo is defeated in Orsay by Bouchard I of Vendôme, a faithful vassal of Capet charged with guarding Melun.
- Stavoren is sacked in Viking raids on the ports of Frisia and the mouths of the Rhine.
- Pietro II Orseolo becomes the 26th Doge of Venice. Venice establishes a protectorate on the coast of the Dalmatian Islands.
- Taranto is sieged by Sicilian Arabs.
- The Dagome iudex, a document which enumerates the possessions of Mieszko I, is written and entrusted to Pope John XV, who places the Polish territories under papal protection.
- Mount Vesuvius erupts.

=== 992 ===
==== By place ====
====== Worldwide ======
- Winter – A superflare from the sun causes an Aurora Borealis, with visibility as far south as Germany and Korea.

====== Europe ======
- Spring – Pietro II Orseolo, doge of Venice, concludes a treaty with Emperor Basil II to transport Byzantine troops, in exchange for commercial privileges in Constantinople. Venetian ships are exempted from customs duties at Abydos (mostly foreign goods are carried on Venetian ships). Venetian merchants in Constantinople are placed directly under the Grand Logothetes (Minister of Finance).
- May 25 – Mieszko I, prince (duke) of the Polans, dies after a reign of more than 30 years at Poznań. He is succeeded by his son Bolesław I the Brave who becomes ruler of Poland. Having inherited the principality (located between the Oder and the Warta rivers), Bolesław forms an alliance with the Holy Roman Empire.
- June 27 – Battle of Conquereuil: The Angevins under Fulk III "the Black", Count of Anjou, defeat the forces of Conan I, duke of Brittany, who is killed in the battle at Conquereuil (France).
- Approximate date – Norse Viking settlers establish a mint in Dublin (Ireland), to produce silver pennies.

=== 993 ===
==== By place ====
====== Europe ======
- Spring – The 12-year-old King Otto III gives the Sword of Saints Cosmas and Damian (also known as the Sword of Essen) as a gift to the convent in Essen. It symbolises the martyrdom of Cosmas and Damian, the patron saints of the city.
- Charles, duke of Lower Lorraine, dies in prison in Orléans (see 991). He is succeeded by his son Otto II, who inherits the full dukedom and pledges his allegiance to Otto III.

==== By topic ====
====== Religion ======
- July 4 – Pope John XV issues a decree canonizing the late Bishop Ulrich of Augsburg, the first recorded canonization of a saint.

====== Astronomy ======
- An increase in ^{14}C concentration, recorded in tree rings, as well as ^{36}Cl and ^{10}Be isotopes, recorded in ice cores, suggests that a strong solar storm may have hit the Earth in either 993 or 994.

=== 994 ===
==== By place ====
====== Byzantine Empire ======
- September 15 – Battle of the Orontes: Fatimid forces, under Turkish general Manjutakin (also the governor of Damascus), besiege Apamea (modern Syria). Emperor Basil II sends a Byzantine expeditionary army, led by Dux Michael Bourtzes, to relieve the city in alliance with the Hamdanid Dynasty. Manjutakin defeats the Hamdanids with his forces and attacks the Byzantine force in the rear. The Byzantine army panics and flees, losing some 5,000 men in the process.

====== Europe ======
- June 23 – Viking Age: Danish Viking raiders, (probably) under King Sweyn Forkbeard, plunder the city of Stade (Lower Saxony). Count Lothair Udo I is captured and killed, during the battle with the pirates.
- September – King Otto III, now 14 years old, receives the regalia to rule the Kingdom of Germany at an assembly of the Imperial Diet in Solingen. Otto appoints Heribert of Cologne as chancellor of Italy.

====== England ======
- A Danish Viking fleet, under Olaf Tryggvason, sails up the Thames Estuary, and besieges London. King Æthelred II (the Unready) pays Olaf 16,000 lbs of silver (Danegeld).
- Olaf Tryggvason, already a baptised Christian, is confirmed as Christian in a ceremony at Andover. After receiving gifts from Æthelred II, Olaf leaves for Norway.

==== By topic ====
====== Astronomy ======
- An increase in carbon-14 concentration, recorded in tree rings, suggests that a strong solar storm may have hit the Earth in either 993 or 994.

=== 995 ===
==== By place ====
====== Japan ======
- 17 May - Fujiwara no Michitaka (imperial regent) dies.
- 3 June: Fujiwara no Michikane gains power and becomes Regent.
- 10 June: Fujiwara no Michikane dies.
- 30 August - Retainers of Takaie clash with retainers of Michinaga, on the main street of Kyoto.
- 4 September - Michinaga’s escort, Hata no Hisatada, is killed by Takaie’s followers.
- 15 October - Michinaga becomes Chief of the Fujiwara Clan.

====== Byzantine Empire ======
- Arab–Byzantine War: Emperor Basil II launches a counter-campaign against the Fatimid Caliphate. He leads a Byzantine expeditionary army (13,000 men) to aid the Hamdanid emir Sa'id al-Dawla, and crosses Asia Minor in only sixteen days. Basil lifts the siege of Aleppo, and takes over the Orontes Valley. He incorporates Syria into the Byzantine Empire (including the larger city of Antioch) which is the seat of its eponymous Patriarch.

====== Europe ======
- King Eric VI (the Victorious) dies at Uppsala, after a 25-year reign. He is succeeded by his son Olof Skötkonung, as the first baptized Christian ruler of Sweden.
- September 28 – Boleslaus II (the Pious), duke of Bohemia, storms Libice Castle and massacres the members of the Slavník Dynasty.
- Olaf Tryggvason is crowned king of Norway (until 1000) and builds the country's first Christian church.
- Malachy captures Dublin for the third time.

====== Scotland ======
- King Kenneth II is murdered at a banquet by Lady Finella in Fettercairn. He is succeeded by his nephew Constantine III (a son of the late King Cuilén) as ruler of Alba (Scotland).

====== England ======
- Uhtred (the Bold), a son of Ealdorman Waltheof I of Northumbria, establishes an episcopal see at Durham and moves the monastic community of Chester-le-Street there.

====== Asia ======
- Goryeo-Khitan War: Negotiations led by the Korean diplomat Sŏ Hŭi prevents a fullscale invasion of the Khitan-led Liao Dynasty. King Seongjong accepts Liao's demands – and agrees to end the alliance with the Chinese Song Dynasty. Goryeo becomes a Liao tributary state, the Khitan army (60,000 men) withdraws while Seongjong orders the Korean border defenses strengthened.

====== Armenia ======
- 995 Balu earthquake. It reportedly affected the Armenian areas of Balu, Cop'k (or Covk'), Palnatun (or Palin), and the districts of Hasteank and Xorjean. The areas affected were districts in what is currently the border area between Armenia and Turkey.

=== 996 ===
==== By place ====
====== Japan ======
- February - Chotoku Incident: Fujiwara no Korechika and Takaie shoot an arrow at Retired Emperor Kazan.
- 2 March: Emperor Ichijo orders the imperial police to raid Korechika's residence; Empress Teishi (sister of Korechika) cuts her hair because of the humiliation; Takaie is arrested, Korechika is absent.
- 5 March: Korechika returns with his head shaven and attired as a monk.

====== Europe ======
- Spring – King Otto III starts his first expedition to Italy from Regensburg, and proceeds over the Brenner Pass. News of Otto's arrival prompts Crescentius II (the Younger), patrician (the de facto ruler) of Rome, to invite Pope John XV (exiled in Tuscany) back to Rome. Otto arrives in Verona, and receives ambassadors of Doge Pietro II Orseolo of Venice.
- May 21 – Otto III, 16, is crowned Emperor of the Holy Roman Empire at St. Peter's Basilica, and claims also the title of King of Italy. His grandmother, Adelaide, retires to a convent she has founded at Seltz (Alsace). Otto puts down a Roman rebellion; a number of nobles (including Crescentius II) are banished for their crimes.
- October 24 – King Hugh I Capet dies in Paris after a 9-year reign and is interred in the Basilica of St. Denis. He is succeeded by his 24-year-old son Robert II (the Pious) as king of France. Robert tries (during his reign) to increase his power, by pressing his claim of feudal lands that become vacant. This results in many territorial disputes.
- November 1 – Otto III grants the Bavarian bishopric of Freising 30 "royal hides" of land (about 800 hectares, or 2,000 acres - 800 hectares is 2,000 acres) in Neuhofen an der Ybbs (Lower Austria). A document (the oldest known) marks the first use of the name Ostarrîchi, meaning "Eastern Realm" (Austria in Old High German).
- November 20 – Richard I (the Fearless), duke of Normandy, dies after a 55-year reign. He is succeeded by his young son Richard II. During his minority, Rodulf of Ivry (his uncle), who wields the power as regent puts down a peasants revolt at the beginning of Richard's reign.

====== Africa ======
- May 15 – The new Fatimid navy is destroyed by fire, resulting in anti-Christian pogroms in Cairo.
- October 14 – Caliph Al-Aziz Billah dies at Bilbeis in Egypt after a 21-year reign in which he has expanded his Shiite caliphate at the expense of the Byzantines, using Turkish mercenaries (Mamelukes). He is succeeded by his 11-year-old son Al-Hakim bi-Amr Allah as ruler of the Fatimid Caliphate (until 1021).
- Revolt of Tyre: The citizens of Tyre (modern Lebanon) revolt against the Fatimid Caliphate. Al-Hakim bi-Amr Allah sends a expeditionary army and navy to blockade the city by land and sea.

====== China ======
- The Niujie Mosque is constructed in Beijing during the Liao Dynasty. The first mosque is built under supervision of the Muslim architect Nazaruddin.

==== By topic ====
====== Religion ======
- April 1 – Pope John XV dies of fever after an 11-year reign. Meeting a Roman embassy at Ravenna, Otto appoints his cousin Bruno of Carinthia (a grandson of the late Emperor Otto I), who duly ascends as Gregory V. He becomes the 138th pope – and the first German pope of the Catholic Church.

=== 997 ===
==== By place ====
====== Japan ======
- 1 February: Empress Teishi gives birth to Princess Shushi - she is the first child of the emperor, but because of the power struggle between Michinaga and Korechika, the empress is not allowed to go to the palace.
- 18 May: The imperial court decides to pardon Korechika and Takaie, under the illness of Teishi.

====== Byzantine Empire ======
- July 16 – Battle of Spercheios: Byzantine forces, under General Nikephoros Ouranos, defeat the Bulgarians at the Spercheios River in Greece. During a night battle, the Bulgarian co-ruler Samuel is wounded; he and his son Gavril Radomir evade capture, by feigning death among the bodies of their slain soldiers. Samuel sets off to Bulgaria, and retreats with the remnants of his army, into the Pindus Mountains. Ouranos returns to Constantinople, with 1,000 heads of Bulgarian soldiers and 12,000 captives.

====== Europe ======
- Al-Mansur, the de facto ruler of Al-Andalus, assaults and partially destroys the city of Santiago de Compostella. He is accompanied in his raid by Christian Portuguese lords, who all receive a share of the booty. On their way, they sack the cities of Zamora and León.
- Summer – Roman of Bulgaria dies in captivity in Constantinople. He is succeeded by his brother Samuel (a member of the Cometopuli dynasty) who takes the Bulgarian title of tsar. He possibly receives his 'imperial crown' from Gregory V (approximate date).
- King Stephen Držislav of Croatia dies after a 28-year reign. His three sons, Svetoslav, Krešimir III and Gojslav, open a violent contest for the throne, weakening the kingdom and allowing Samuel to encroach on the Croatian possessions along the Adriatic.
- Winter – Emperor Otto III travels to Italy, leaving the government of the Holy Roman Empire in the hands of his aunt, Matilda of Quedlinburg. He is accompanied by Bishop Gilbert of Aurillac, his teacher and advisor.
- Trondheim is founded by King Olav Tryggvason. This will function as the main city and capital of Norway, until Bergen is founded in 1070.

====== Scotland ======
- King Constantine III dies after a 2-year reign, possibly murdered by a dynastic conflict between two rival lines of royalty. He is succeeded by Kenneth III as sole ruler of Alba (Scotland).

====== Central Asia ======
- Sabuktigin, founder of the Ghaznavid dynasty, dies after a 20-year reign. He is succeeded by his son Ismail as emir of Ghazna. But many in the court favor his elder brother Mahmud.

====== China ======
- May 8 – Emperor Tai Zong (Zhao Jiong) dies at Kaifeng after a 21-year reign. He is succeeded by his son Zhen Zong as the third ruler of the Song dynasty.

==== By topic ====
====== Religion ======
- Spring – Pope Gregory V is exiled during a rebellion led by Crescentius II (the Younger), patrician (the de facto ruler) of Rome. The Crescentii family appoints Giovanni Filagato (former tutor of Otto III) as an antipope under the name John XVI (or XVII), until 998.
- April 23 – Adalbert, exiled bishop of Prague, organises a mission to convert the Old Prussians in north-east Poland. On his way, Adalbert is murdered by pagans on the Baltic coast. His body is bought back for its weight in gold by Duke Bolesław I (the Brave).
- The first documented reference of Gdańsk is made by Adalbert. During his mission he baptises the inhabitants of the city called Gyddannyzc.

=== 998 ===
==== By place ====
====== Europe ======
- Spring – Otto III retakes Rome and restores power in the papal city. Crescentius II (the Younger) and his followers barricade themselves in Castel Sant'Angelo. Otto's former tutor John Philagathos (Antipope John XVI), who tries to escape into Campania, is pursued by German troops and captured. He is horribly mutilated – his ears, nose and tongue cut off and his eyes are gouged out. Crescentius surrenders at his stronghold and is beheaded. Otto reinstates his cousin, Gregory V, as pope of the Catholic Church.
- Croatian–Bulgarian War: Emperor Samuel launches a military campaign against the Kingdom of Croatia to prevent an alliance between the Serbian principality and the Byzantines. He seizes Dyrrachium (modern-day Durrës in Albania) and advances along the Dalmatian coast. The Bulgarian army is forced to withdraw into Croatian hinterlands (now part of Bosnia and Herzegovina), after the Siege of Zadar.
- Fall – Otto III makes Rome the administrative capital of the Holy Roman Empire and begins the construction of his imperial palace on the Palatine Hill. He restores the ancient Roman Senate to its position of prominence and adopts the title of "Emperor of the Romans". To this Otto adds the apostolic devotion formula servus Jesu Christi ('Servant of Jesus Christ').
- Winter – King Robert II (the Pious) is excommunicated by Gregory V. For reasons of consanguinity, his second marriage to Bertha of Burgundy is not accepted by the Catholic Church.

====== Arabian Empire ======
- Battle of Ghazni: The Afghan prince Mahmud defeats his younger brother Ismail (the ruling emir of the Ghaznavid Dynasty) in battle. He places Ismail in comfortable captivity for the rest of his life and expands the realm of his late father, Sebuktigin, into the Punjab in northwestern India.
- Summer – Revolt of Tyre: The city of Tyre (modern Lebanon) is stormed by forces of the Fatimid Caliphate. A Byzantine squadron attempts to reinforce but is repulsed by the Fatimid navy. The defenders are massacred or taken captive to Egypt. The Byzantine captives are executed.
- July 19 – Battle of Apamea: Byzantine forces under governor (doux) Damian Dalassenos besiege the fortress city of Apamea for control over northern Syria. The Fatimids send a relief army from Damascus – and defeat the Byzantines, Dalassenos is killed by a Kurdish officer in battle.

====== Japan ======
- Byōdō-in Temple (located in Yamashiro Province) is built during the Heian Period on orders of Fujiwara no Michinaga, who uses the Buddhist temple as a countryside retreat villa (modern-day Kyoto Prefecture).

==== By topic ====
====== Religion ======
- Winter – Otto III makes a pilgrimage through middle Italy from Gargano to Benevento. Stopping by Monte Cassino, where he meets the hermit monk Romuald.
- Bishop Wulfsige III establishes a Benedictine abbey at Sherborne (Dorsetshire).

=== 999 ===
==== By place and name ====
====== Japan ======
- 9 February: The Mogi Ceremony of Fujiwara no Shoshi is held (she later becomes empress).
- December: Empress Teishi gives birth to Prince Atsuyasu (who becomes the imperial heir), but on the next day, her rival, Fujiwara no Shoshi, is promoted to Consort.

====== Europe ======
- King Bermudo II abdicates in favor of his 5-year-old son Alfonso V as ruler of León. Moorish invaders have forced Bermudo to recognize the suzerainty of their leader, Umayyad vizier and the de facto ruler Al-Mansur.
- 9 September (999 or 1000) – Battle of Svolder: A Norwegian fleet, commanded by Olaf Tryggvason, is defeated by the combined fleet of the Danish king Sweyn Forkbeard and his Swedish counterpart Olaf the Swede, resulting in Tryggvason's death, and the splitting up of Norway between Sweden and Denmark.

====== Ireland ======
- December 30 - Battle of Glenmama: The combined forces of Munster and Meath under Brian Boru (High King of Ireland) inflict a crushing defeat on the allied armies of Leinster and Dublin near Lyons Hill (County Kildare).

====== Central Asia ======
- The Karakhanids invade from north of the Syr Darya River, ending the Samanid Empire (modern Iran). The Samanid domains are split between the Ghaznavid Dynasty and the Karakhanids.

==== By topic ====
====== Religion ======
- February 18 – Pope Gregory V dies after a 3-year pontificate in which the Crescentii family forced him to flee Rome. He is succeeded by Sylvester II as the 139th pope of the Catholic Church.
- Bishop Aldhun consecrates a cathedral (later Durham Cathedral), at a site where the remains of St. Cuthbert had been moved to in AD 995 from Lindisfarne because of the danger of Viking raids.
- Sigmundur Brestisson, a Viking chieftain, introduces Christianity in the Faroe Islands.

== Significant people ==
- Al-Qadir
- Mahmud of Ghazni
- Pope John XV
- Pope Gregory V

== Births ==
990

- November 11 – Gisela of Swabia, Holy Roman Empress (d. 1043)
- Adamo Abate, Italian Benedictine abbot (approximate date)
- Al-Qadi Abu Ya'la, Arab Hanbali scholar and jurist (d. 1066)
- Bi Sheng, Chinese inventor of movable type printing (d. 1051)
- Chananel ben Chushiel, Tunisian Jewish rabbi (d. 1053)
- Conrad II (the Elder), Holy Roman Emperor (d. 1039)
- Edmund II (Ironside), king of England (d. 1016)
- Grigor Magistros, Armenian prince (d. 1058)
- John Scotus, bishop of Mecklenburg (d. 1066)
- John Vladimir, Serbian prince (approximate date)
- Kálfr Árnason, Norwegian chieftain (approximate date)
- Mieszko II, king of Poland (approximate date)
- Nissim ben Jacob, Tunisian Jewish rabbi (d. 1062)
- Theobald of Dorat, French monk and saint (d. 1070)
- Theodoric II, margrave of Lower Lusatia (d. 1034)
- Thietmar, margrave of the Saxon Ostmark (d. 1030)
- Tughril, sultan of the Seljuk Empire (d. 1063)
- Yaakov ben Yakar, German Jewish rabbi (d. 1064)
- Zhang Xian, Chinese poet and writer (d. 1078)

991

- Guido Monaco, Italian monk and music theorist (or 992)
- Pons II (or Pons William), count of Toulouse (d. 1060)
- Yan Shu, Chinese statesman and poet (d. 1055)

992

- August 1 – Hyeonjong, king of Goryeo (Korea) (d. 1031)
- Fujiwara no Michimasa, Japanese nobleman (d. 1054)
- Fujiwara no Yorimichi, Japanese nobleman (d. 1071)
- Guido Monaco, Italian monk and music theorist (or 991)
- Otto Orseolo, doge of Venice (approximate date)
- Ulric Manfred II, count of Turin (approximate date)

993

- Majd al-Dawla, Buyid emir of Rayy (d. 1029)
- Samuel ibn Naghrillah, Spanish Talmudic scholar
- Sultan al-Dawla, Buyid emir of Fars (d. 1024)

994

- November 7 – Ibn Hazm, Andalusian historian and poet (d. 1064)
- Ahmad al-Bayhaqi, Persian Sunni hadith scholar (d. 1066)
- Alfonso V (the Noble), king of León (Spain) (d. 1028)
- Lothair Udo I, margrave of the Nordmark (d. 1057)
- Sancho III (the Great), king of Pamplona (approximate date)
- Simeon, Norman abbot of Ely Abbey (approximate date)
- Wallada bint al-Mustakfi, Andalusian female poet (d. 1091)

995

- Abu'l-Fadl Bayhaqi, Persian historian and writer (d. 1077)
- Cnut (the Great), king of Denmark, Norway and England (d. 1035)
- Dominic Loricatus, Italian priest and hermit (d. 1060)
- Frederick II, duke of Upper Lorraine (approximate date)
- Herman II, archbishop of Cologne (approximate date)
- Hemma of Gurk, German noblewoman (d. 1045)
- Olaf II Haraldsson (St. Olaf), king of Norway (d. 1030)
- Reginar V, French nobleman (approximate date)
- Shaykh Tusi, Persian Shia scholar (d. 1067)
- William I, Norman nobleman (approximate date)

996

- July 29 – Fujiwara no Norimichi, Japanese nobleman (d. 1075)
- Drogo of Mantes, count of Valois and the Vexin (d. 1035)
- Elvira Menéndez, queen consort of León (approximate date)
- Oda of Meissen, queen consort of Poland (approximate date)

997

- Alan III (de Bretagne), duke of Brittany (d. 1040)
- Bertha of Milan, Lombard duchess and regent (approximate date)
- Godfrey III, duke of Lower Lorraine (approximate date)
- Gusiluo, Tibetan religious leader of Buddhism (d. 1065)
- Gytha Thorkelsdóttir, Danish noblewoman (approximate date)
- Ibn al-Wafid, Andalusian pharmacologist (d. 1074)
- Rhys ap Tewdwr, king of Deheubarth (d. 1093)

998

- Ibn Abi Hasina, Arab poet and panegyrist (d. 1065)
- Mas'ud I, sultan of the Ghaznavid Empire (d. 1040)
- Muhammad, sultan of the Ghaznavid Empire (d. 1041)
- Song Qi, Chinese statesman and historian (d. 1061)
- Zeng Gongliang, Chinese scholar and writer (d. 1078)

999

- March 5 – Bao Zheng, politician of the Song Dynasty (d. 1062)
- Berengar of Tours, French theologian (approximate date) (d. 1088)
- Fujiwara no Ishi, Japanese empress consort (d. 1036)
- Odo of Rennes, duke and regent of Brittany (d. 1079)

== Deaths ==
990

- March 15 – Siegfried I (the Older), German nobleman
- March 25 – Nicodemus of Mammola, Italian monk and saint
- April 23 – Ekkehard II (the Courtier), Swiss monk and abbot
- June 15 – Theophanu, Holy Roman Empress and regent
- July 26 – Fujiwara no Kaneie, Japanese statesman (b. 929)
- September 16 – Folcuin, Frankish abbot of Saint Bertin
- December 10 – Folcmar (Poppo), bishop of Utrecht
- Al-Saghani, Persian astronomer and historian of science
- Al-Tamimi, Arab writer and physician (approximate date)
- Dunash ben Labrat, Arab Jewish commentator (b. 920)
- Indra Pala, ruler of the Pala Dynasty (India) (b. 960)
- Kiyohara no Motosuke, Japanese nobleman (b. 908)
- Nazif ibn Yumn, Melkite Christian mathematician and translator
- Oliba Cabreta, count of Cerdanya and Besalú (Spain)
- Qarghuyah, Hamdanid administrator and governor
- Sahl ben Matzliah, Jewish philosopher (b. 910)
- Urard Mac Coise, Irish poet (Ollamh Érenn)

991

- March 1 – En'yū, emperor of Japan (b. 959)
- April 2 – Bardas Skleros, Byzantine general
- April 4 – Reginold, bishop of Eichstätt
- May 11 – Heriward, Frankish abbot
- May 20 – Piligrim, bishop of Passau
- August 11 – Byrhtnoth, ealdorman of Essex
- Aleramo, marquess of Montferrat and Liguria
- Al-Muqaddasi, Arab Muslim geographer
- Ashot-Sahak, king of Vaspurakan (Armenia)
- Bakjur, Hamdanid mercenary and governor
- Gausfred I, count of Empúries and Roussillon
- Ibn Babawayh, Persian Shi'ite scholar
- Meng Xuanzhe, prince of Later Shu (b. 937)
- Nakatsukasa, Japanese waka poet (b. 912)
- Ōnakatomi no Yoshinobu, Japanese nobleman (b. 921)
- Pan Mei, Chinese general and statesman
- Qian Weijun, king of Wuyue (Ten Kingdoms) (b. 955)
- Sa'd al-Dawla, Hamdanid emir (b. 952)
- Suero Gundemáriz, Spanish nobleman
- Taira no Kanemori, Japanese nobleman
- Ya'qub ibn Killis, Fatimid vizier (b. 930)

992

- February 1 – Jawhar al-Siqilli, Fatimid general
- February 29 – Oswald, archbishop of Worcester
- May 25 – Mieszko I, prince (duke) of Poland
- June 15 – Michael I, Kievan metropolitan bishop
- June 27 – Conan I, duke of Brittany
- July 1 – Heonjeong, queen of Goryeo (Korea) (b. 961)
- August 23 – Volkold, bishop of Meissen
- December 3 – Lothar II, German nobleman
- Æthelwine, ealdorman of East Anglia
- Abu al-Hassan al-Amiri, Persian philosopher
- Adso of Montier-en-Der, Frankish abbot (b. 920)
- Fujiwara no Nakafumi, Japanese waka poet (b. 923)
- Fujiwara no Tamemitsu, Japanese statesman (b. 942)
- Herbert of Wetterau, German nobleman
- Liu Jiyuan, emperor of Northern Han
- Maelpeadair Ua Tolaid, Irish abbot
- Marino Cassianico, bishop of Venice

993

- March 13 – Odo I, German nobleman
- October 19 – Conrad I, king of Burgundy
- December 9 – Egbert, archbishop of Trier
- Arnulf (or Aernout), count of Friesland
- Borrell II, count of Barcelona and Urgell
- Charles, duke of Lower Lorraine (b. 953)
- David II, prince of Tao-Klarjeti (Georgia)
- Landenulf II, Lombard prince of Capua
- Maelcairearda, king of Uí Briúin (Ireland)
- Minamoto no Masanobu, Japanese nobleman (b. 920)
- William I, French nobleman (b. 950)

994

- February 3 – William IV, duke of Aquitaine (b. 937)
- April 4 – Egbert (the One-Eyed), German nobleman
- April 23 – Gerard of Toul, German priest and bishop
- May 11 – Majolus of Cluny, Frankish priest and abbot
- June 23 – Lothair Udo I, German nobleman (b. 950)
- June 24 – Abu Isa al-Warraq, Arab scholar (b. 889)
- July 8 – Richardis, margravine consort of Austria
- July 10 – Leopold I, margrave of Austria (b. 940)
- October 28 – Sigeric, archbishop of Canterbury
- October 31 – Wolfgang, bishop of Regensburg
- Bagrat II, king of Iberia-Kartli (Georgia) (b. 937)
- Fujiwara no Takamitsu, Japanese waka poet
- Ibn Juljul, Andalusian physician (approximate date)
- Sancho Garcés II, king of Navarre (Spain)

995

- March 30 – Sahib ibn Abbad, Persian statesman
- May 10 – Baldwin I (or Boudewijn), bishop of Utrecht
- May 16 – Fujiwara no Michitaka, Japanese nobleman (b. 953)
- June 13 – Fujiwara no Michikane, Japanese nobleman (b. 961)
- Abu 'Abdallah Muhammad, Afrighid ruler of Khwarezm
- Al-Mansur ibn Buluggin, Zirid ruler of Ifriqiyah
- Bernard I (the Suspicious), Frankish nobleman
- Egill Skallagrímsson, Viking poet (approximate date)
- Eric VI (the Victorious), Viking king of Sweden
- García Fernández, count of Castile and Álava
- Gebhard II, bishop of Constance (b. 949)
- Gerberga of Lorraine, Frankish noblewoman
- Haakon Sigurdsson, Viking ruler (jarl) of Norway
- Henry II (the Wrangler), duke of Bavaria (b. 951)
- Herbert III (the Younger), Frankish nobleman
- Kenneth II (the Fratricide), king of Alba (Scotland)
- Lady Finella, Scottish noblewoman and assassin
- Michitsuna no Haha, Japanese female poet
- Mstivoj, Obodrite prince (approximate date)
- Song, empress of the Song Dynasty (b. 952)

996

- March 12 – Odo I, Count of Blois (Eudes), French nobleman
- April 1 – John XV, pope of the Catholic Church
- October 14 – Al-Aziz Billah, Fatimid caliph (b. 955)
- October 24 – Hugh I Capet, king of France (b. 941)
- November 20 – Richard I, duke of Normandy (b. 932)
- Abu Talib al-Makki, Shafi'i jurist and hadith scholar
- Li Fang, Chinese scholar and encyclopedist (b. 925)
- Gilla Pátraic mac Donnchada, king of Osraige (Ireland)
- Herman I, Count Palatine of Lotharingia (the Slender), German nobleman (b. 945)
- Ibn Abi Zayd, Muslim imam and scholar (b. 922)
- Ki no Tokibumi, Japanese waka poet (b. 922)
- Strachkvas, Bohemian prince and chronicler
- Takashina no Takako, Japanese female poet

997

- April 23 – Adalbert of Prague, Bohemian bishop
- May 8 – Tai Zong, Chinese emperor (b. 939)
- July 23 – Nuh II, Samanid emir (b. 963)
- August 20 – Conrad I, duke of Swabia
- October 6 – Minamoto no Mitsunaka, Japanese samurai (b. 912)
- November 29 – Seongjong, Korean king (b. 961)
- Abu Bakr Ibn Al-Qutia, Andalusian historian
- Constantine III, king of Alba (Scotland)
- Géza (or Gejza), Grand Prince of Hungary
- Gonzalo Menéndez, Portuguese nobleman
- Gonzalo Sánchez, count of Aragon (Spain)
- Ibn Battah al-Ukbari, Arab theologian (b. 917)
- Idwal ap Meurig, king of Gwynedd (Wales)
- Máel Coluim, king of Strathclyde (Scotland)
- Waldrada of Tuscany, dogaressa of Venice
- Ma'mun I ibn Muhammad, ruler of Khwarezm
- Roman, ruler (tsar) of the Bulgarian Empire
- Sabuktigin, founder of the Ghaznavid dynasty
- Stephen Držislav (Dirzislaus), king of Croatia
- Tailapa II, ruler of the Western Chalukya Empire
- Teresa Ansúrez, queen and regent of León

998

- July 15 – Abu al-Wafa' Buzjani, Persian mathematician (b. 940)
- July 19 – Damian Dalassenos, Byzantine governor (doux)
- August 8 – Sŏ Hŭi, Korean politician and diplomat (b. 942)
- August 19 – Fujiwara no Sukemasa, Japanese statesman (b. 944)
- August 24 – Sisinnius II, patriarch of Constantinople
- October 28 – Sigfried, count of the Ardennes (Luxembourg)
- Æthelweard, English ealdorman and historian (approximate date)
- Koppány (or Cupan), Hungarian nobleman (approximate date)
- Landulf of Carcano, Lombard chronicler and archbishop
- Nikon the Metanoeite, Byzantine monk and preacher
- Samsam al-Dawla, emir of the Buyid Dynasty (b. 963)
- Yelü Xiuge, general and politician of the Liao Dynasty

999

- February 7 – Boleslaus II (the Pious), duke of Bohemia
- February 18 – Gregory V, pope of the Catholic Church (b. 972)
- June 11 – Ebergar (or Everger), archbishop of Cologne
- November 4 – Gregor von Burtscheid, German abbot
- November 29 – Li Chun'an, Chinese merchant (b. 921)
- December 16 – Adelaide, empress regent of the Holy Roman Empire (b. 931)
- Alfred of Malmesbury (or Aelfric), English abbot and writer
- Cao Bin, Chinese general and governor (jiedushi) (b. 931)
- Ceallach ua Maílcorgus, Irish chief poet of Connacht
- Maredudd ab Owain, king of Gwynedd (Wales) (approximate date)
- Matilda, German princess-abbess and daughter of Otto I (b. 955)
- Muirgheas mac Aedh, king of Uí Díarmata (Ireland)
- Subh of Córdoba, mother and regent of Hisham II
- Yelü Xiezhen, Chinese general and politician
