= 930 =

Calendar year

930 in various calendars
- Gregorian calendar: 930; CMXXX
- Ab urbe condita: 1683
- Armenian calendar: 379; ԹՎ ՅՀԹ
- Assyrian calendar: 5680
- Balinese saka calendar: 851–852
- Bengali calendar: 336–337
- Berber calendar: 1880
- Buddhist calendar: 1474
- Burmese calendar: 292
- Byzantine calendar: 6438–6439
- Chinese calendar: 己丑年 (Earth Ox); 3627 or 3420 — to — 庚寅年 (Metal Tiger); 3628 or 3421
- Coptic calendar: 646–647
- Discordian calendar: 2096
- Ethiopian calendar: 922–923
- Hebrew calendar: 4690–4691
- Hindu calendars
- Vikram Samvat: 986–987
- Shaka Samvat: 851–852
- Kali Yuga: 4030–4031
- Holocene calendar: 10930
- Iranian calendar: 308–309
- Islamic calendar: 317–318
- Japanese calendar: Enchō 8 (延長８年)
- Javanese calendar: 829–830
- Julian calendar: 930; CMXXX
- Korean calendar: 3263
- Minguo calendar: 982 before ROC 民前982年
- Nanakshahi calendar: −538
- Seleucid era: 1241/1242 AG
- Thai solar calendar: 1472–1473
- Tibetan calendar: ས་མོ་གླང་ལོ་ (female Earth-Ox); 1056 or 675 or −97 — to — ལྕགས་ཕོ་སྟག་ལོ་ (male Iron-Tiger); 1057 or 676 or −96

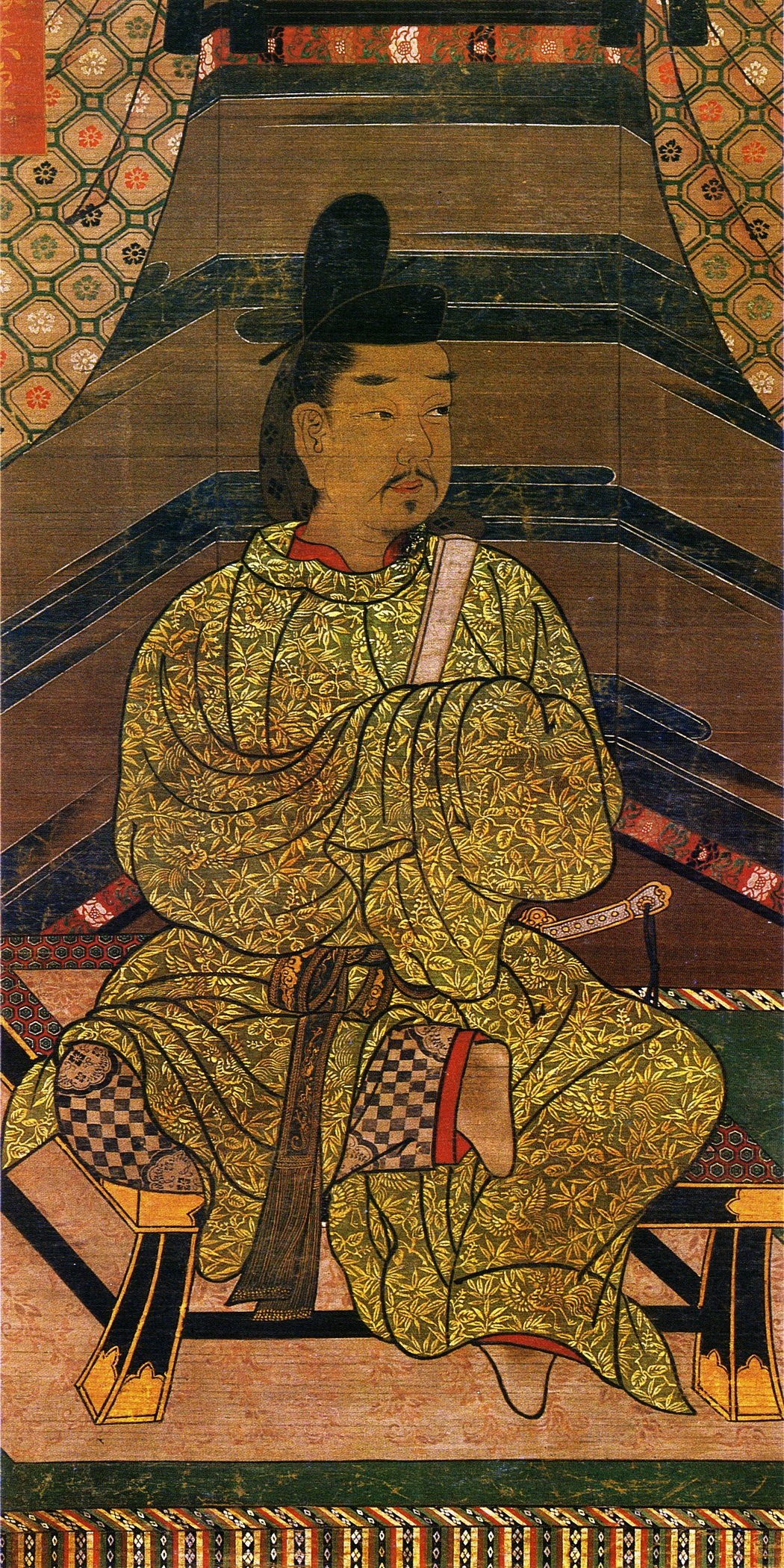
Emperor Daigo 897-930

Year 930 (CMXXX) was a common year starting on Friday of the Julian calendar.

== Events ==
=== By place ===
==== Europe ====
- The Althing, the parliament of Iceland, is established at Þingvellir ("Thing Fields"). Chieftains from various tribes gather for 2 weeks at a thing (assembly) to settle disputes, arrange marriages, etc.; it continues in existence into the 21st century, as the world's oldest parliament of the Icelandic Commonwealth.
- Bishopwearmouth is formed and settled in the north-east of England, after Æthelstan grants the lands to the Bishop of Durham.
- Gilbert, Duke of Lorraine, besieges Douai in West Francia.

==== Arabian Empire ====
- January 11 – Sack of Mecca: The Qarmatians, led by Abu Tahir al-Jannabi, sack Mecca, desecrating the Zamzam Well and carrying off the Black Stone to their homeland in Eastern Arabia.
- Mardavij ibn Ziyar is sent by Asfar ibn Shiruya along with his brother Shirzad, to capture the fortress of Shamiran in Tarom (Northern Iran), the capital of the Sallarid ruler Muhammad ibn Musafir. During the siege Mardavij is persuaded to revolt against Asfar, by letters from Makan ibn Kaki. With the help of the sons of the Sallarid, he kills other members of his tribe, including Shirzad. Mardavij founds the Ziyarid Dynasty and becomes the ruler of Asfar's former territories, which include Rey, Qazvin, Zanjan, Abhar, Qom and Karaj.

==== Asia ====
- October 16 – Emperor Daigo of Japan, being fatally ill, abdicates in favor of his 7-year-old son Suzaku, after a 33-year reign. He enters the Buddhist priesthood, but dies shortly after. Former Emperor Uda (Daigo's father), remains the power behind the Japanese throne (until 931).
- The independent Korean island state of Usan-guk becomes a protectorate of Goryeo.
- Yelü Bei, prince and elder brother of the Liao dynasty (Khitan) Emperor Taizong, leaves for China.

== Births ==
- Alferius, Italian abbot and saint (d. 1050)
- Boleslaus II, duke of Bohemia (d. 999)
- Gisulf I, prince of Salerno (d. 977)
- Herbert of Wetterau, German nobleman (d. 992)
- Lambert of Chalon, Frankish nobleman (d. 978)
- Liudolf, Swabia (approximate date) (d. 957)
- Mieszko I, prince of Poland (approximate date) (d. 992)
- Nikon the Metanoeite, Byzantine monk (d. 998)
- Odo I, German nobleman (approximate date) (d. 993)
- Ya'qub ibn Killis, Fatimid vizier (d. 991)
- Zhang Mi, Chinese Ci lyric poet (d. unknown)

== Deaths ==
- May 31 – Liu Hua, princess of Southern Han (b. 896)
- June 19 – Xiao Qing, chancellor of Later Liang (b. 862)
- June 20 – Hucbald, Frankish monk and music theorist
- October 26 – Li Qi, chancellor of Later Liang (b. 871)
- November 19 – Yan Keqiu, Chinese chief strategist
- December 2 – Ma Yin, Chinese warlord and king (b. 853)
- Amoghavarsha II, ruler of Rashtrakuta (India)
- García II Sánchez, duke of Gascony (approximate date)
- Sharwin II, ruler of the Bavand Dynasty (Iran)
- Xia Luqi, general of Later Tang (b. 882)
- Abū Kāmil Shujāʿ ibn Aslam, Egyptian mathematician (b. c. 850)
- Óengus mac Óengusa, Irish poet and Chief Ollam of Ireland
