= 991 =

Calendar year

991 in various calendars
- Gregorian calendar: 991; CMXCI
- Ab urbe condita: 1744
- Armenian calendar: 440; ԹՎ ՆԽ
- Assyrian calendar: 5741
- Balinese saka calendar: 912–913
- Bengali calendar: 397–398
- Berber calendar: 1941
- Buddhist calendar: 1535
- Burmese calendar: 353
- Byzantine calendar: 6499–6500
- Chinese calendar: 庚寅年 (Metal Tiger); 3688 or 3481 — to — 辛卯年 (Metal Rabbit); 3689 or 3482
- Coptic calendar: 707–708
- Discordian calendar: 2157
- Ethiopian calendar: 983–984
- Hebrew calendar: 4751–4752
- Hindu calendars
- Vikram Samvat: 1047–1048
- Shaka Samvat: 912–913
- Kali Yuga: 4091–4092
- Holocene calendar: 10991
- Iranian calendar: 369–370
- Islamic calendar: 380–381
- Japanese calendar: Shōryaku 2 (正暦２年)
- Javanese calendar: 892–893
- Julian calendar: 991; CMXCI
- Korean calendar: 3324
- Minguo calendar: 921 before ROC 民前921年
- Nanakshahi calendar: −477
- Seleucid era: 1302/1303 AG
- Thai solar calendar: 1533–1534
- Tibetan calendar: ལྕགས་ཕོ་སྟག་ལོ་ (male Iron-Tiger); 1117 or 736 or −36 — to — ལྕགས་མོ་ཡོས་ལོ་ (female Iron-Hare); 1118 or 737 or −35

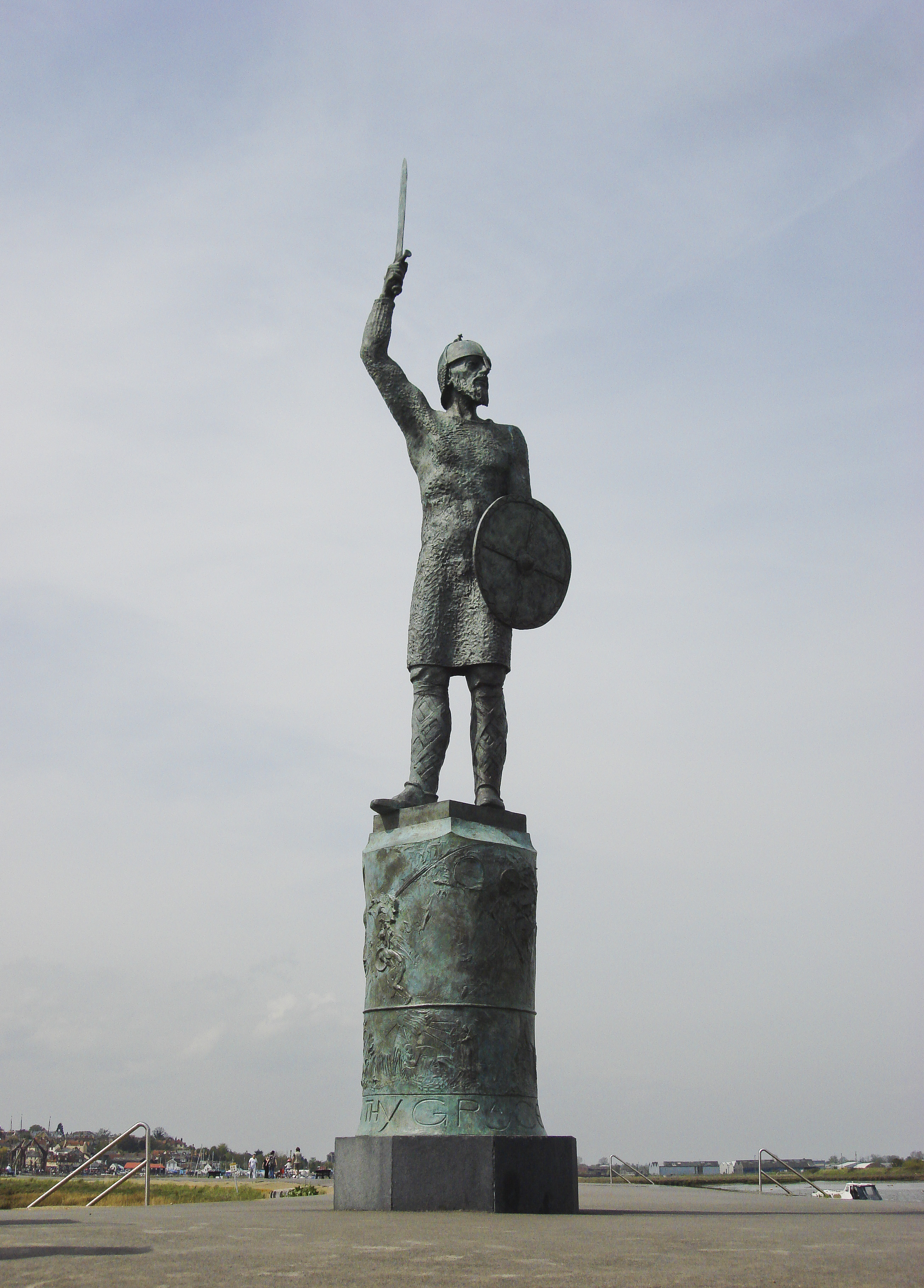
Statue of Byrhtnoth at Maldon (Essex)

Year 991 (CMXCI) was a common year starting on Thursday of the Julian calendar.

== Events ==
- March 1: In Rouen, Pope John XV ratifies the first Truce of God, between Æthelred the Unready and Richard I of Normandy.
- March 29: Bishop Adalberon imprisons the treasonous Duke Charles of Lorraine and his nephew Arnulf, the Archbishop of Reims. Adalberon delivers the two men to King Hugh Capet, who imprisons them and their family in Orléans. The cities of Reims and Laon are returned to Capet.
- April 5: 991 Damascus earthquake in Syria: According to historian George Elmacin (13th century), the earthquake caused the fall of 1,000 houses in Damascus itself, and many people were trapped in their ruins and died. The village of Beglabec was reportedly engulfed, due to the earthquake.
- Spring: Byzantine Emperor Basil II begins a campaign against the Bulgarians.
- June 15: Theophanu dies in Nijmegen, and Adelaide of Italy assumes full regency over her grandson, Otto III.
- June 17 – 18: The royal council of Saint-Basle de Verzy is marked by opposition between the bishops and the monks. Gerbert d'Aurillac is elected as the deposed Arnulf's successor as the Archbishop of Reims, to the anger of Pope John XV, who had no involvement in the decision.
- August 11: Following a raid by Olaf Tryggvason at the mouth of the River Thames, ealdorman Byrhtnoth is killed in the Battle of Maldon in Essex, which is commemorated in the Old English poem The Battle of Maldon. Æthelred the Unready is forced to pay a tribute of 22,000 pounds of silver for Tryggvason to withdraw his troops; this is the first in a series of Danegelds.
- November 22: The beginning of the reign of al-Qadir, Abbasid caliph of Baghdad, under the tutelage of the Buyids and following the deposition of al-Ta'i.

=== Unknown dates ===
- Count Odo I of Blois, who captured Melun, is driven out of the city by the coalition of King Hugh Capet, Count Fulk III of Anjou and Richard I of Normandy; Odo is defeated in Orsay by Bouchard I of Vendôme, a faithful vassal of Capet charged with guarding Melun.
- Stavoren is sacked in Viking raids on the ports of Frisia and the mouths of the Rhine.
- Pietro II Orseolo becomes the 26th Doge of Venice. Venice establishes a protectorate on the coast of the Dalmatian Islands.
- Taranto is sieged by Sicilian Arabs.
- The Dagome iudex, a document which enumerates the possessions of Mieszko I, is written and entrusted to Pope John XV, who places the Polish territories under papal protection.
- Mount Vesuvius erupts.

== Births ==
- Edmund Ironside King of England in 1016 (approximate date) (d. 1016)
- Guido Monaco, Italian monk and music theorist (or 992)
- Pons II (or Pons William), count of Toulouse (d. 1060)
- Yan Shu, Chinese statesman and poet (d. 1055)

== Deaths ==
- March 1 – En'yū, emperor of Japan (b. 959)
- April 2 – Bardas Skleros, Byzantine general
- April 4 – Reginold, bishop of Eichstätt
- May 11 – Heriward, Frankish abbot
- May 20 – Piligrim, bishop of Passau
- August 11 – Byrhtnoth, ealdorman of Essex
- Aleramo, marquess of Montferrat and Liguria
- Al-Muqaddasi, Arab Muslim geographer
- Ashot-Sahak, king of Vaspurakan (Armenia)
- Bakjur, Hamdanid mercenary and governor
- Gausfred I, count of Empúries and Roussillon
- Ibn Babawayh, Persian Shi'ite scholar
- Meng Xuanzhe, prince of Later Shu (b. 937)
- Nakatsukasa, Japanese waka poet (b. 912)
- Ōnakatomi no Yoshinobu, Japanese nobleman (b. 921)
- Pan Mei, Chinese general and statesman
- Qian Weijun, king of Wuyue (Ten Kingdoms) (b. 955)
- Sa'd al-Dawla, Hamdanid emir (b. 952)
- Suero Gundemáriz, Spanish nobleman
- Taira no Kanemori, Japanese nobleman
- Ya'qub ibn Killis, Fatimid vizier (b. 930)
