= 992 =

Calendar year

992 in various calendars
- Gregorian calendar: 992; CMXCII
- Ab urbe condita: 1745
- Armenian calendar: 441; ԹՎ ՆԽԱ
- Assyrian calendar: 5742
- Balinese saka calendar: 913–914
- Bengali calendar: 398–399
- Berber calendar: 1942
- Buddhist calendar: 1536
- Burmese calendar: 354
- Byzantine calendar: 6500–6501
- Chinese calendar: 辛卯年 (Metal Rabbit); 3689 or 3482 — to — 壬辰年 (Water Dragon); 3690 or 3483
- Coptic calendar: 708–709
- Discordian calendar: 2158
- Ethiopian calendar: 984–985
- Hebrew calendar: 4752–4753
- Hindu calendars
- Vikram Samvat: 1048–1049
- Shaka Samvat: 913–914
- Kali Yuga: 4092–4093
- Holocene calendar: 10992
- Iranian calendar: 370–371
- Islamic calendar: 381–382
- Japanese calendar: Shōryaku 3 (正暦３年)
- Javanese calendar: 893–894
- Julian calendar: 992; CMXCII
- Korean calendar: 3325
- Minguo calendar: 920 before ROC 民前920年
- Nanakshahi calendar: −476
- Seleucid era: 1303/1304 AG
- Thai solar calendar: 1534–1535
- Tibetan calendar: ལྕགས་མོ་ཡོས་ལོ་ (female Iron-Hare); 1118 or 737 or −35 — to — ཆུ་ཕོ་འབྲུག་ལོ་ (male Water-Dragon); 1119 or 738 or −34

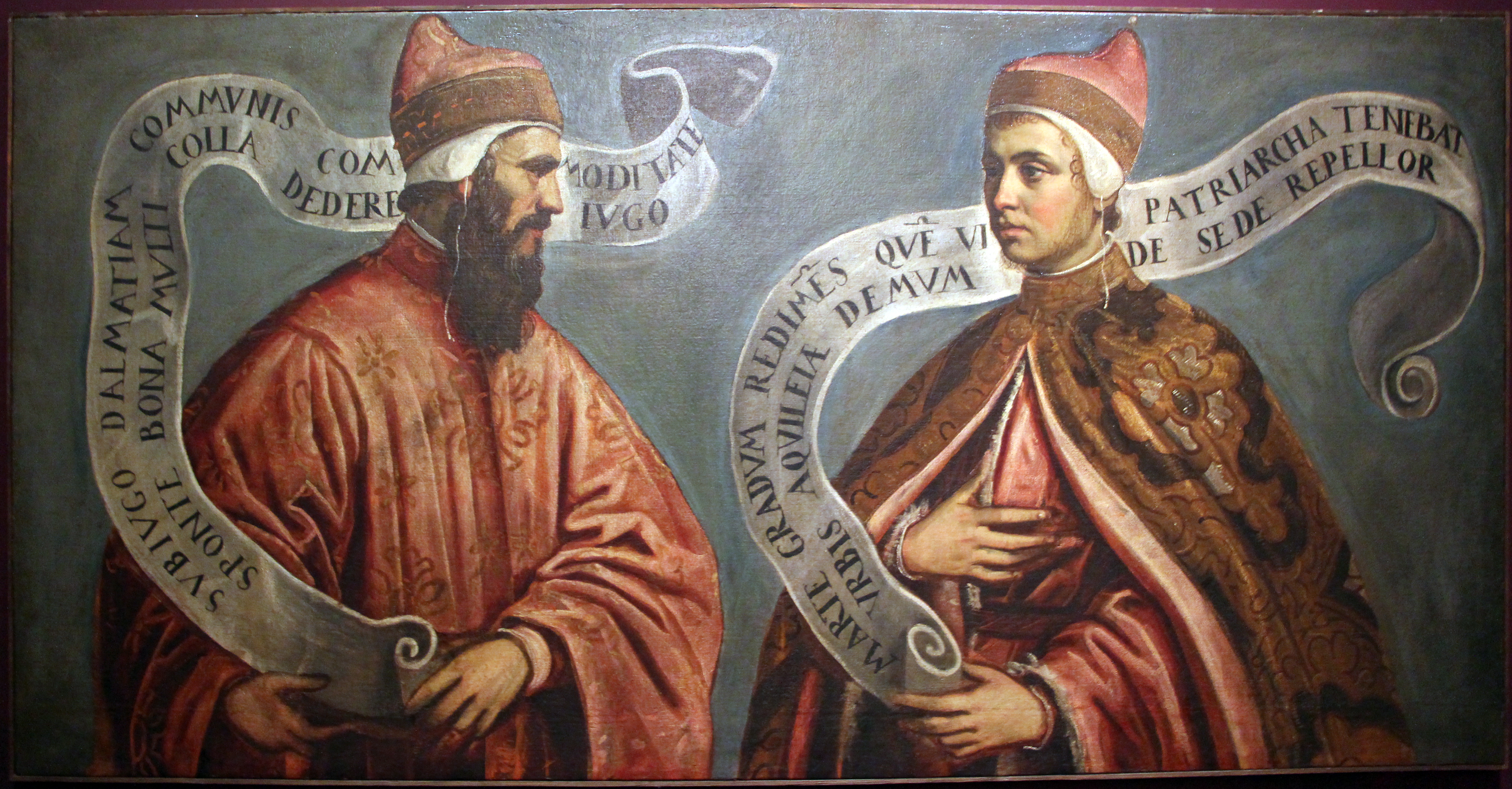
Pietro II Orseolo (left) and his son Otto.

Year 992 (CMXCII) was a leap year starting on Friday of the Julian calendar.

== Events ==
=== By place ===
==== Worldwide ====
- Winter – A superflare from the sun causes an Aurora Borealis, with visibility as far south as Germany and Korea.

==== Europe ====
- Spring – Pietro II Orseolo, doge of Venice, concludes a treaty with Emperor Basil II to transport Byzantine troops, in exchange for commercial privileges in Constantinople. Venetian ships are exempted from customs duties at Abydos (mostly foreign goods are carried on Venetian ships). Venetian merchants in Constantinople are placed directly under the Grand Logothetes (Minister of Finance).
- May 25 – Mieszko I, prince (duke) of the Polans, dies after a reign of more than 30 years at Poznań. He is succeeded by his son Bolesław I the Brave who becomes ruler of Poland. Having inherited the principality (located between the Oder and the Warta rivers), Bolesław forms an alliance with the Holy Roman Empire.
- June 27 – Battle of Conquereuil: The Angevins under Fulk III "the Black", Count of Anjou, defeat the forces of Conan I, duke of Brittany, who is killed in the battle at Conquereuil (France).
- Approximate date – Norse Viking settlers establish a mint in Dublin (Ireland), to produce silver pennies.

== Births ==
- August 1 – Hyeonjong, king of Goryeo (Korea) (d. 1031)
- Fujiwara no Michimasa, Japanese nobleman (d. 1054)
- Fujiwara no Yorimichi, Japanese nobleman (d. 1071)
- Guido Monaco, Italian monk and music theorist (or 991)
- Otto Orseolo, doge of Venice (approximate date)
- Ulric Manfred II, count of Turin (approximate date)

== Deaths ==
- February 1 – Jawhar al-Siqilli, Fatimid general
- February 29 – Oswald, archbishop of Worcester
- May 25 – Mieszko I, prince (duke) of Poland
- June 15 – Michael I, Kievan metropolitan bishop
- June 27 – Conan I, duke of Brittany
- July 1 – Heonjeong, queen of Goryeo (Korea) (b. 961)
- August 23 – Volkold, bishop of Meissen
- December 3 – Lothar II, German nobleman
- Æthelwine, ealdorman of East Anglia
- Abu al-Hassan al-Amiri, Persian philosopher
- Adso of Montier-en-Der, Frankish abbot (b. 920)
- Fujiwara no Nakafumi, Japanese waka poet (b. 923)
- Fujiwara no Tamemitsu, Japanese statesman (b. 942)
- Herbert of Wetterau, German nobleman
- Liu Jiyuan, emperor of Northern Han
- Maelpeadair Ua Tolaid, Irish abbot
- Marino Cassianico, bishop of Venice
