= 998 =

Calendar year

998 in various calendars
- Gregorian calendar: 998; CMXCVIII
- Ab urbe condita: 1751
- Armenian calendar: 447; ԹՎ ՆԽԷ
- Assyrian calendar: 5748
- Balinese saka calendar: 919–920
- Bengali calendar: 404–405
- Berber calendar: 1948
- Buddhist calendar: 1542
- Burmese calendar: 360
- Byzantine calendar: 6506–6507
- Chinese calendar: 丁酉年 (Fire Rooster); 3695 or 3488 — to — 戊戌年 (Earth Dog); 3696 or 3489
- Coptic calendar: 714–715
- Discordian calendar: 2164
- Ethiopian calendar: 990–991
- Hebrew calendar: 4758–4759
- Hindu calendars
- Vikram Samvat: 1054–1055
- Shaka Samvat: 919–920
- Kali Yuga: 4098–4099
- Holocene calendar: 10998
- Iranian calendar: 376–377
- Islamic calendar: 387–389
- Japanese calendar: Chōtoku 4 (長徳４年)
- Javanese calendar: 899–900
- Julian calendar: 998; CMXCVIII
- Korean calendar: 3331
- Minguo calendar: 914 before ROC 民前914年
- Nanakshahi calendar: −470
- Seleucid era: 1309/1310 AG
- Thai solar calendar: 1540–1541
- Tibetan calendar: མེ་མོ་བྱ་ལོ་ (female Fire-Bird); 1124 or 743 or −29 — to — ས་ཕོ་ཁྱི་ལོ་ (male Earth-Dog); 1125 or 744 or −28

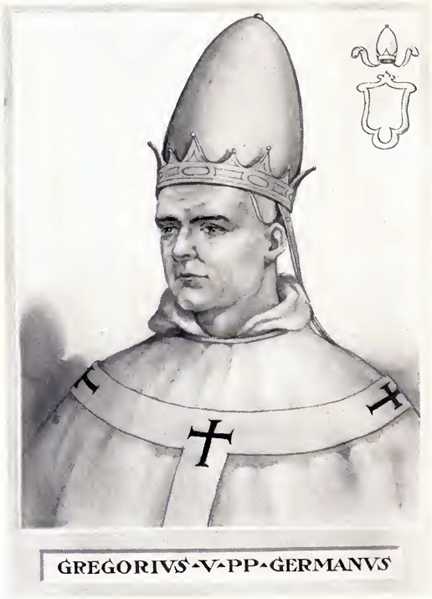
Pope Gregory V (c. 972–999)

Year 998 (CMXCVIII) was a common year starting on Saturday of the Julian calendar.

== Events ==
=== By place ===
==== Europe ====
- Spring – Otto III retakes Rome and restores power in the papal city. Crescentius II (the Younger) and his followers barricade themselves in Castel Sant'Angelo. Otto's former tutor John Philagathos (Antipope John XVI), who tries to escape into Campania, is pursued by German troops and captured. He is horribly mutilated – his ears, nose and tongue cut off and his eyes are gouged out. Crescentius surrenders at his stronghold and is beheaded. Otto reinstates his cousin, Gregory V, as pope of the Catholic Church.
- Croatian–Bulgarian War: Emperor Samuel launches a military campaign against the Kingdom of Croatia to prevent an alliance between the Serbian principality and the Byzantines. He seizes Dyrrachium (modern-day Durrës in Albania) and advances along the Dalmatian coast. The Bulgarian army is forced to withdraw into Croatian hinterlands (now part of Bosnia and Herzegovina), after the Siege of Zadar.
- Fall – Otto III makes Rome the administrative capital of the Holy Roman Empire and begins the construction of his imperial palace on the Palatine Hill. He restores the ancient Roman Senate to its position of prominence and adopts the title of "Emperor of the Romans". To this Otto adds the apostolic devotion formula servus Jesu Christi ('Servant of Jesus Christ').
- Winter – King Robert II (the Pious) is excommunicated by Gregory V. For reasons of consanguinity, his second marriage to Bertha of Burgundy is not accepted by the Catholic Church.

==== Persia ====
- Battle of Ghazni: The Afghan prince Mahmud defeats his younger brother Ismail (the ruling emir of the Ghaznavid Dynasty) in battle. He places Ismail in comfortable captivity for the rest of his life and expands the realm of his late father, Sebuktigin, into the Punjab in northwestern India.

==== Arabian Empire ====
- Summer – Revolt of Tyre: The city of Tyre (modern Lebanon) is stormed by forces of the Fatimid Caliphate. A Byzantine squadron attempts to reinforce but is repulsed by the Fatimid navy. The defenders are massacred or taken captive to Egypt. The Byzantine captives are executed.
- July 19 – Battle of Apamea: Byzantine forces under governor (doux) Damian Dalassenos besiege the fortress city of Apamea for control over northern Syria. The Fatimids send a relief army from Damascus – and defeat the Byzantines, Dalassenos is killed by a Kurdish officer in battle.

==== Japan ====
- Byōdō-in Temple (located in Yamashiro Province) is built during the Heian Period on orders of Fujiwara no Michinaga, who uses the Buddhist temple as a countryside retreat villa (modern-day Kyoto Prefecture).

=== By topic ===
==== Religion ====
- Winter – Otto III makes a pilgrimage through middle Italy from Gargano to Benevento. Stopping by Monte Cassino, where he meets the hermit monk Romuald.
- Bishop Wulfsige III establishes a Benedictine abbey at Sherborne (Dorsetshire).

== Births ==
- Ibn Abi Hasina, Arab poet and panegyrist (d. 1065)
- Masʽud I, sultan of the Ghaznavid Empire (d. 1040)
- Muhammad, sultan of the Ghaznavid Empire (d. 1041)
- Song Qi, Chinese statesman and historian (d. 1061)
- Zeng Gongliang, Chinese scholar and writer (d. 1078)

== Deaths ==
- July 15 – Abu al-Wafa' Buzjani, Persian mathematician (b. 940)
- July 19 – Damian Dalassenos, Byzantine governor (doux)
- August 8 – Sŏ Hŭi, Korean politician and diplomat (b. 942)
- August 19 – Fujiwara no Sukemasa, Japanese statesman (b. 944)
- August 24 – Sisinnius II, patriarch of Constantinople
- October 28 – Sigfried, count of the Ardennes (Luxembourg)
- Æthelweard, English ealdorman and historian (approximate date)
- Koppány (or Cupan), Hungarian nobleman (approximate date)
- Landulf of Carcano, Lombard chronicler and archbishop
- Nikon the Metanoeite, Byzantine monk and preacher
- Samsam al-Dawla, emir of the Buyid Dynasty (b. 963)
- Yelü Xiuge, general and politician of the Liao Dynasty
