= 1054 =

1054 in various calendars
- Gregorian calendar: 1054; MLIV
- Ab urbe condita: 1807
- Armenian calendar: 503; ԹՎ ՇԳ
- Assyrian calendar: 5804
- Balinese saka calendar: 975–976
- Bengali calendar: 460–461
- Berber calendar: 2004
- English Regnal year: N/A
- Buddhist calendar: 1598
- Burmese calendar: 416
- Byzantine calendar: 6562–6563
- Chinese calendar: 癸巳年 (Water Snake); 3751 or 3544 — to — 甲午年 (Wood Horse); 3752 or 3545
- Coptic calendar: 770–771
- Discordian calendar: 2220
- Ethiopian calendar: 1046–1047
- Hebrew calendar: 4814–4815
- Hindu calendars
- Vikram Samvat: 1110–1111
- Shaka Samvat: 975–976
- Kali Yuga: 4154–4155
- Holocene calendar: 11054
- Igbo calendar: 54–55
- Iranian calendar: 432–433
- Islamic calendar: 445–446
- Japanese calendar: Tengi 2 (天喜２年)
- Javanese calendar: 957–958
- Julian calendar: 1054; MLIV
- Korean calendar: 3387
- Minguo calendar: 858 before ROC 民前858年
- Nanakshahi calendar: −414
- Seleucid era: 1365/1366 AG
- Thai solar calendar: 1596–1597
- Tibetan calendar: ཆུ་མོ་སྦྲུལ་ལོ་ (female Water-Snake); 1180 or 799 or 27 — to — ཤིང་ཕོ་རྟ་ལོ་ (male Wood-Horse); 1181 or 800 or 28

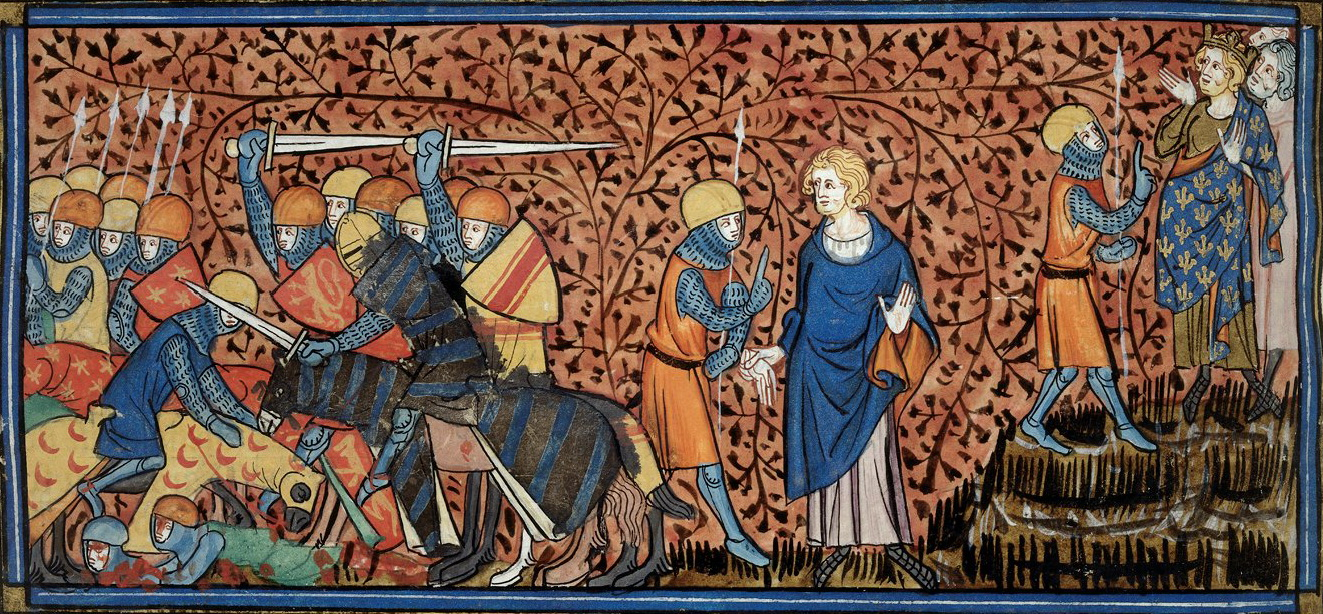
King Henry I of France (right) receives a courier from William the Bastard.

Year 1054 (MLIV) was a common year starting on Saturday of the Julian calendar.

== Events ==
East-West schism: the ongoing break of communion between the Roman Catholic and Eastern Orthodox churches.

=== By place ===
==== Byzantine Empire ====
- Sultan Tughril leads a large Seljuk army out of Azerbaijan into Armenia, possibly to consolidate his frontier, while providing an incentive to his Turkoman allies in the form of plunder. Tughril divides his army into four columns, ordering three to veer off to the north to raid into central and northern Armenia, while he takes the fourth column towards Lake Van. The Seljuk Turks capture and sack the fortress city of Artchesh, after an 8-day siege.

==== Europe ====
- Battle of Mortemer: The Normans, led by Duke William the Conqueror, defeat a French army (near Mortemer), as it is caught pillaging and plundering. King Henry I of France withdraws his main army from the Duchy of Normandy as a result. Guy I, Count of Ponthieu, is captured during the course of the battle.

==== Scotland ====
- July 27 – Siward, earl of Northumbria, invades Scotland, to support King Malcolm III against Macbeth, who has usurped the Scottish throne from Malcolm's father, Duncan I. Macbeth is defeated at Dunsinane.

==== Africa ====
- The Almoravids retake the trading center of Aoudaghost from the Ghana Empire. Repeated Almoravid incursions, aimed at seizing control of the trans-Saharan gold trade, disrupt Ghana's dominance of the trade routes.

==== Asia ====
- Lý Nhật Tôn, third king of the Lý dynasty, begins to rule in Vietnam, and changes the country's official name to Đại Việt.

=== By topic ===
==== Astronomy ====
- July 4 (approx.) – SN 1054, a supernova, is first observed by the Chinese, Arabs and possibly Native Americans, near the star Zeta Tauri. For 23 days it remains bright enough to be seen in daylight. Its remnants form the Crab Nebula (NGC 1952).

==== Religion ====
- Spring – Pope Leo IX sends a legatine mission, under Cardinal Humbert of Silva Candida, to Constantinople, to negotiate with Patriarch Michael I Cerularius, in response to his actions concerning the church in Constantinople. Leo becomes the first pope directly to invoke the forged Donation of Constantine, citing a large portion in a letter to Michael, believing it genuine.
- July 16 – East-West Schism: Humbert of Silva Candida, representative of the newly deceased Leo IX, breaks the relations between Western and Eastern Churches, through the act of placing an invalidly-issued Papal Bull of excommunication during the celebration of the Divine Liturgy.

== Births ==
- September 2 – Sukjong, ruler of Goryeo (d. 1105)
- Al-Hariri of Basra, Abbasid poet and scholar (d. 1122)
- Bohemond I of Antioch, Italo-Norman nobleman (approximate date)
- George II (Giorgi), king of Georgia (approximate date)
- Judith of Lens, niece of William the Conqueror (or 1055)
- Judith of Swabia, queen consort of Hungary (d. 1105)
- Langri Tangpa, Tibetan Buddhist master (d. 1123)
- Ramon Berenguer II, Count of Barcelona (or 1053)
- Tong Guan, Chinese general and adviser (d. 1126)

== Deaths ==
- February 20 – Yaroslav the Wise, Kievan Rus' grand prince (b. c.978)
- March 8 – Azelin (Azellinus), bishop of Hildesheim
- April 19 – Pope Leo IX, German pontiff of the Catholic Church (b. 1002)
- July 19 – Bernold (Bernulf), bishop of Utrecht
- August 25 – Fujiwara no Michimasa, Japanese nobleman (b. 992)
- August 31 – Kunigunde of Altdorf, German noblewoman (b. c.1020)
- September 1 – Fortún Sánchez, Navarrese nobleman (b. c.992)
- September 15 – García Sánchez III, king of Pamplona (b. c.1012)
- September 24 – Hermann of Reichenau, German music theorist (b. 1013)
- Abu Sahl Zawzani, Persian statesman and chief secretary
- Atiśa, Tibetan Buddhist leader and master (b. c.980)
- Cacht ingen Ragnaill, queen consort of Munster
- Nuño Álvarez de Carazo, Castilian nobleman
- Osbern Pentecost, Norman knight and nobleman
- Osgod Clapa (Osgot), Anglo-Saxon nobleman
