= 962 =

Calendar year

962 in various calendars
Gregorian calendar	962; CMLXII
Ab urbe condita	1715
Armenian calendar	411; ԹՎ ՆԺԱ
Assyrian calendar	5712
Balinese saka calendar	883–884
Bengali calendar	368–369
Berber calendar	1912
Buddhist calendar	1506
Burmese calendar	324
Byzantine calendar	6470–6471
Chinese calendar	辛酉年 (Metal Rooster); 3659 or 3452 — to — 壬戌年 (Water Dog); 3660 or 3453
Coptic calendar	678–679
Discordian calendar	2128
Ethiopian calendar	954–955
Hebrew calendar	4722–4723
- Hindu calendars
Vikram Samvat	1018–1019
Shaka Samvat	883–884
Kali Yuga	4062–4063
Holocene calendar	10962
Iranian calendar	340–341
Islamic calendar	350–351
Japanese calendar	Ōwa 2 (応和２年)
Javanese calendar	862–863
Julian calendar	962; CMLXII
Korean calendar	3295
Minguo calendar	950 before ROC 民前950年
Nanakshahi calendar	−506
Seleucid era	1273/1274 AG
Thai solar calendar	1504–1505
Tibetan calendar	ལྕགས་མོ་བྱ་ལོ་ (female Iron-Bird); 1088 or 707 or −65 — to — ཆུ་ཕོ་ཁྱི་ལོ་ (male Water-Dog); 1089 or 708 or −64

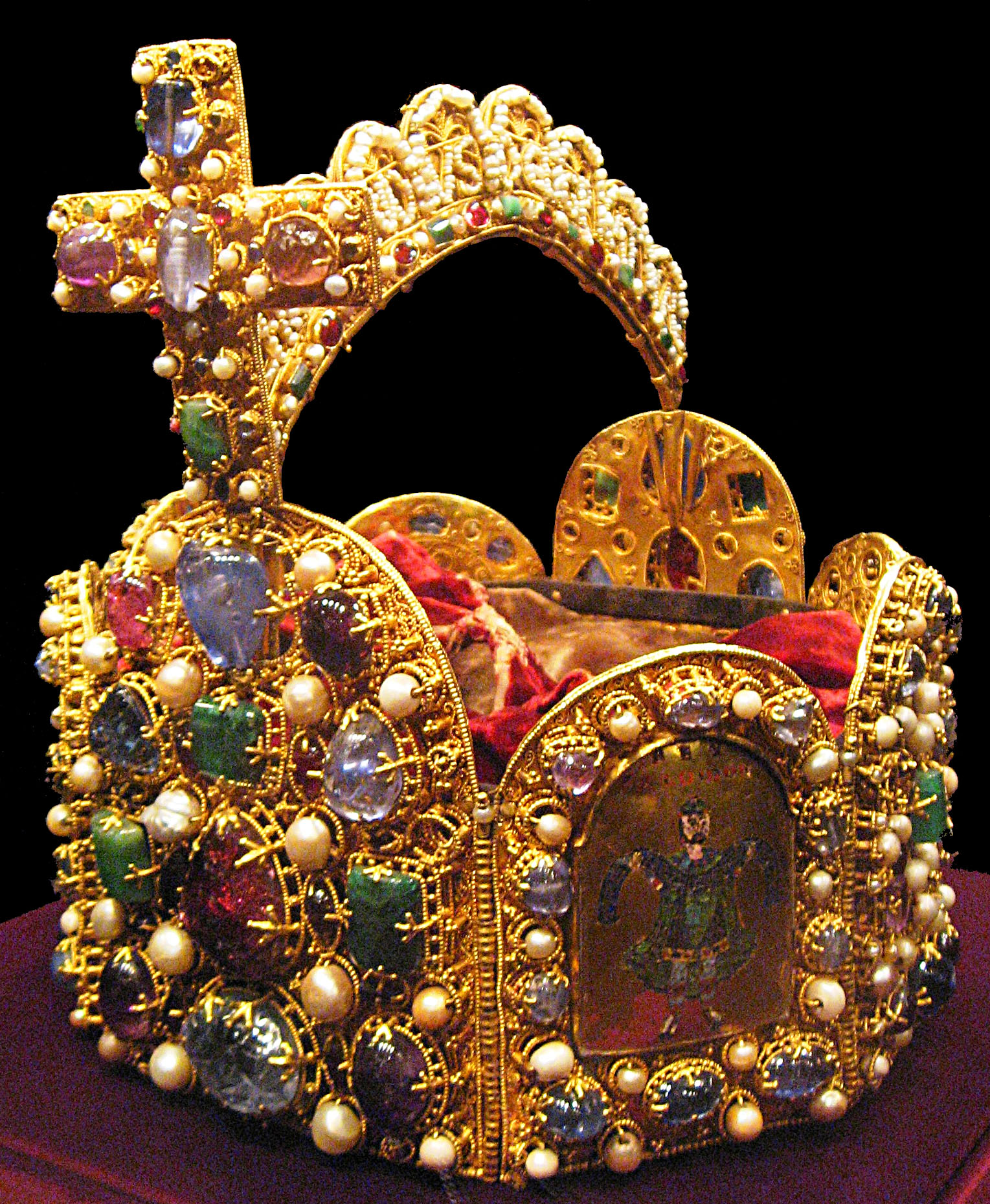
King Otto I (the Great) is crowned with the Imperial Crown of the Holy Roman Empire.

Year 962 (CMLXII) was a common year starting on Wednesday of the Julian calendar.

== Events ==
=== By place ===
==== Byzantine Empire ====
- December – Arab–Byzantine wars – Sack of Aleppo: A Byzantine expeditionary force under General Nikephoros Phokas invades northern Syria, and sacks Aleppo, capital of the Hamdanid emir Sayf al-Dawla. In late December Aleppo is taken by storm, with the population killed or enslaved; the city is razed. The Byzantine army takes possession of 390,000 silver dinars, 2,000 camels and 1,400 mules.

==== Europe ====
- February 2 – King Otto I (the Great) is crowned Holy Roman Emperor by Pope John XII at the Old St. Peter's Basilica, ending Rome's feudal anarchy. Otto's wife Adelaide is anointed as empress; the East Frankish Kingdom and the Kingdom of Italy are unified into a common realm, called the Roman Empire.
- February 13 – Otto I and John XII co-sign the Diploma Ottonianum, confirming John XII as the spiritual head of the Catholic Church. Otto recognizes John XII's secular control over the Papal States – by expanding the domain over the Exarchate of Ravenna, the Duchy of Spoleto, and the Duchy of Benevento.
- Summer – Otto I makes Oberto I, a margrave of the Obertenghi family, count palatine (a position second only to his own). He is granted the March of Obertenga (Eastern Liguria) and establishes his capital in Genoa. Oberto also receives the possessions of the Abbey of Bobbio (famous for its scriptorium).
- Otto I takes his army to lay siege at San Giulio, an island within Lake Orta (Piedmont), where Queen Willa (the wife of King Berengar II) has barricaded herself. She surrenders and is allowed to go free by Otto. Willa departs for Montefeltro to join her husband.
- Otto I proceeds to lay siege to Lake Garda, where the sons of Berengar II, Guy of Ivrea and Adalbert II (co-ruler of Italy), and their supporters are holed up. Finding severe resistance, Otto gives up the enterprise and returns to Pavia, the capital of Lombardy.
- Fall – Otto I receives news that John XII has betrayed him and entered into intrigues with Berengar II, but also with the Byzantine Empire. The letters are intercepted by Pandulf I (Ironhead), Lombard prince of Benevento.

==== Scotland ====
- Indulf, king of the Scots and Picts, dies after an 8-year reign. He is killed while fighting Vikings near Cullen, at the Battle of Bauds. Indulf is succeeded by his nephew Dub (Dub mac Maíl Coluim) as ruler of Scotland.

=== By topic ===
==== Religion ====
- St. Paul's Cathedral in London is destroyed by fire, but rebuilt in the same year.

== Births ==
- Bernard Roger, French nobleman (approximate date)
- Edward II (the Martyr), king of England (approximate date)
- Geoffrey (or Godfrey), French nobleman (d. 1015)
- Ibn Faradi, Moorish scholar and historian (d. 1012)
- Liu Mei, Chinese official and general (approximate date)
- Odilo of Cluny, French Benedictine abbot (d. 1049)
- Rogneda of Polotsk, Grand Princess of Kiev (d. 1002)
- Wang Qinruo, Chinese chancellor (approximate date)
- William of Volpiano, Italian abbot and architect (d. 1031)

== Deaths ==
- April 26 – Adalbero I, bishop of Metz
- May 23 – Guibert, Frankish abbot (b. 892)
- October 14 – Gerloc, Frankish noblewoman
- Æthelwald, ealdorman of East Anglia
- Baldwin III (the Young), Frankish nobleman
- Charles Constantine, Frankish nobleman
- Dong Yuan, Chinese painter (approximate date)
- Gao Baoxu, king of Nanping (China) (b. 924)
- Gauzelin, Frankish nobleman and bishop
- Hamza al-Isfahani, Persian historian (approximate date)
- Hugh of Vermandois, Frankish archbishop (b. 920)
- Ibn az-Zayyat, Hamdanid governor
- Indulf (the Aggressor), king of Scotland
- Liu Congxiao, Chinese general (b. 906)
- Ordoño IV, king of León (or 963)
- Sigurd Haakonsson, Norse Viking nobleman
- William Taillefer I, Frankish nobleman
