= 920 =

Calendar year

920 in various calendars
- Gregorian calendar: 920; CMXX
- Ab urbe condita: 1673
- Armenian calendar: 369; ԹՎ ՅԿԹ
- Assyrian calendar: 5670
- Balinese saka calendar: 841–842
- Bengali calendar: 326–327
- Berber calendar: 1870
- Buddhist calendar: 1464
- Burmese calendar: 282
- Byzantine calendar: 6428–6429
- Chinese calendar: 己卯年 (Earth Rabbit); 3617 or 3410 — to — 庚辰年 (Metal Dragon); 3618 or 3411
- Coptic calendar: 636–637
- Discordian calendar: 2086
- Ethiopian calendar: 912–913
- Hebrew calendar: 4680–4681
- Hindu calendars
- Vikram Samvat: 976–977
- Shaka Samvat: 841–842
- Kali Yuga: 4020–4021
- Holocene calendar: 10920
- Iranian calendar: 298–299
- Islamic calendar: 307–308
- Japanese calendar: Engi 20 (延喜２０年)
- Javanese calendar: 819–820
- Julian calendar: 920; CMXX
- Korean calendar: 3253
- Minguo calendar: 992 before ROC 民前992年
- Nanakshahi calendar: −548
- Seleucid era: 1231/1232 AG
- Thai solar calendar: 1462–1463
- Tibetan calendar: ས་མོ་ཡོས་ལོ་ (female Earth-Hare); 1046 or 665 or −107 — to — ལྕགས་ཕོ་འབྲུག་ལོ་ (male Iron-Dragon); 1047 or 666 or −106

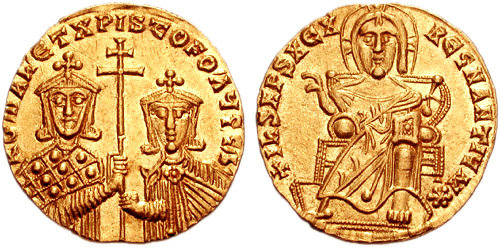
Gold solidus of Romanos I with his eldest son, Christopher Lekapenos (right).

Year 920 (CMXX) was a leap year starting on Saturday of the Julian calendar.

== Events ==
=== By place ===
==== Byzantine Empire ====
- December 17 – Romanos I has himself crowned co-emperor of the Byzantine Empire. He shares the throne with the 15-year-old Constantine VII (his son-in-law), and constructs an alternative palace at Constantinople with an adjoining monastery near the Great Palace. Though Constantine retains his formal position as first on the protocol list, Romanos becomes sole ruler.

==== Europe ====
- The nobles of Lotharingia under Gilbert, duke of Lorraine, revolt against King Charles III ("the Simple"). They recognize King Henry I ("the Fowler") as their sovereign. Charles invades Lotharingia as far as Pfeddersheim (near Worms), but retreats when he learns that Henry is mobilizing an army to attack the West Frankish Kingdom.
- Henry I conquers Utrecht (modern-day Netherlands), which has been in possession of the Vikings for 70 years. Balderic, bishop of Utrecht, moves his seat back from Deventer to Utrecht (approximate date).

==== Britain ====
- High-Reeve Ealdred I, ruler of the former kingdom of Bernicia (Northumbria), and his brother Uhtred, submit to the overlordship of King Edward the Elder (approximate date).
- The Welsh ruler Hywel Dda ("the Good") merges Dyfed and Seisyllwg, establishing a new kingdom known as Deheubarth.

==== Iberian Peninsula ====
- July 26 — At the Battle of Valdejunquera, the Muslim forces of the Emir Abd-ar-Rahman III of Córdoba, defeat the Christian armies of King Ordoño II of León and King Sancho I of Pamplona. The decisive battle at the Val de Junquera takes place following the Emir's pre-emptive strike and his invasion of the upper Douro valley and the capture of Osma. The Arab army proceeds on to the upper Ebro, restoring and replenishing Umayyad garrisons in the region.

==== Africa ====
- The Golden Age of the Ghana Empire begins in Africa (approximate date).

==== Asia ====
- Emperor Taizu of the Khitan Empire orders the adoption of a written script by the Khitan, resulting in the creation of Khitan "Large Script."

=== By topic ===
==== Climate ====
- Muslim chroniclers in Baghdad record an unusually cold summer.

== Births ==
- Adso of Montier-en-Der, Frankish Benedictine abbot (d. 992)
- Athanasius the Athonite, Byzantine monk (approximate date)
- Dunash ben Labrat, Spanish Jewish commentator (d. 990)
- Fujiwara no Morotada, Japanese statesman (d. 969)
- Gao Baorong, king of Nanping (Ten Kingdoms) (d. 960)
- Goltregoda, Frankish countess and regent (d. 963)
- Guntram the Rich, founder of the House of Habsburg (d. 973)
- Haakon I, king of Norway (approximate date)
- Hugh of Vermandois, Frankish archbishop (d. 962)
- Li Jingsui, prince of Southern Tang (d. 958)
- Liu Bin, emperor of Southern Han (d. 943)
- Liu Sheng, emperor of Southern Han (d. 958)
- Liutprand of Cremona, Lombard bishop (d. 972)
- Louis IV, king of the West Frankish Kingdom (or 921)
- Megingoz, count of Guelders (approximate date)
- Menahem ben Saruq, Spanish Jewish philologist (d. 970)
- Minamoto no Masanobu, Japanese nobleman (d. 993)
- Miró III, count of Cerdanya and Besalú (d. 984)
- Oliba Cabreta, Frankish nobleman (approximate date)
- Ratna Pala, king of Kamarupa (India) (d. 960)
- Reginar III, Frankish nobleman (approximate date)
- Rogvolod, prince of Polotsk (approximate date)

== Deaths ==
- Abd-Allah Mikali, Abbasid governor
- Abu Sa'id al-Janadi, Arab scholar
- Æthelweard, son of Alfred the Great (or 922)
- Ahmad ibn Sahl, Samanid governor
- Brahma Pala, king of Kamarupa
- Georgios I, ruler of Makuria (Egypt)
- Harumichi no Tsuraki, Japanese poet
- Mael Macduach, king of Hy Fiachrach (Ireland)
- Raymond I, count of Pallars and Ribagorza (Spain)
- Stephen of Liège, Frankish bishop
- Yang Longyan, king of Wu (b. 897)
