= 993 =

Calendar year

993 in various calendars
- Gregorian calendar: 993; CMXCIII
- Ab urbe condita: 1746
- Armenian calendar: 442; ԹՎ ՆԽԲ
- Assyrian calendar: 5743
- Balinese saka calendar: 914–915
- Bengali calendar: 399–400
- Berber calendar: 1943
- Buddhist calendar: 1537
- Burmese calendar: 355
- Byzantine calendar: 6501–6502
- Chinese calendar: 壬辰年 (Water Dragon); 3690 or 3483 — to — 癸巳年 (Water Snake); 3691 or 3484
- Coptic calendar: 709–710
- Discordian calendar: 2159
- Ethiopian calendar: 985–986
- Hebrew calendar: 4753–4754
- Hindu calendars
- Vikram Samvat: 1049–1050
- Shaka Samvat: 914–915
- Kali Yuga: 4093–4094
- Holocene calendar: 10993
- Iranian calendar: 371–372
- Islamic calendar: 382–383
- Japanese calendar: Shōryaku 4 (正暦４年)
- Javanese calendar: 894–895
- Julian calendar: 993; CMXCIII
- Korean calendar: 3326
- Minguo calendar: 919 before ROC 民前919年
- Nanakshahi calendar: −475
- Seleucid era: 1304/1305 AG
- Thai solar calendar: 1535–1536
- Tibetan calendar: ཆུ་ཕོ་འབྲུག་ལོ་ (male Water-Dragon); 1119 or 738 or −34 — to — ཆུ་མོ་སྦྲུལ་ལོ་ (female Water-Snake); 1120 or 739 or −33

Duchy of Lower Lorraine (green) after 977.

97Year 993 (CMXCIII) was a common year starting on Sunday of the Julian calendar.

== Events ==
=== By place ===
==== Europe ====
- Spring – The 12-year-old King Otto III gives the Sword of Saints Cosmas and Damian (also known as the Sword of Essen) as a gift to the convent in Essen. It symbolises the martyrdom of Cosmas and Damian, the patron saints of the city.
- Charles, duke of Lower Lorraine, dies in prison in Orléans (see 991). He is succeeded by his son Otto II, who inherits the full dukedom and pledges his allegiance to Otto III.

==== Africa ====
- Egyptian military commander Isa ibn Nasturus ibn Surus appointed Vizier of Egypt.

=== By topic ===
==== Religion ====
- July 4 – Pope John XV issues a decree canonizing the late Bishop Ulrich of Augsburg, the first recorded canonization of a saint.

==== Astronomy ====
- An increase in ^{14}C concentration, recorded in tree rings, as well as ^{36}Cl and ^{10}Be isotopes, recorded in ice cores, suggests that a strong solar storm may have hit the Earth in either 993 or 994.

== Births ==
- Majd al-Dawla, Buyid emir of Rayy (d. 1029)
- Samuel ibn Naghrillah, Spanish Talmudic scholar
- Sultan al-Dawla, Buyid emir of Fars (d. 1024)

== Deaths ==
- March 13 – Odo I, German nobleman
- October 19 – Conrad I, king of Burgundy
- December 9 – Egbert, archbishop of Trier
- Arnulf (or Aernout), count of Friesland
- Borrell II, count of Barcelona and Urgell
- Charles, duke of Lower Lorraine (b. 953)
- David II, prince of Tao-Klarjeti (Georgia)
- Landenulf II, Lombard prince of Capua
- Maelcairearda, king of Uí Briúin (Ireland)
- Minamoto no Masanobu, Japanese nobleman (b. 920)
- William I, French nobleman (b. 950)
