= 952 =

Calendar year

952 in various calendars
Gregorian calendar	952; CMLII
Ab urbe condita	1705
Armenian calendar	401; ԹՎ ՆԱ
Assyrian calendar	5702
Balinese saka calendar	873–874
Bengali calendar	358–359
Berber calendar	1902
Buddhist calendar	1496
Burmese calendar	314
Byzantine calendar	6460–6461
Chinese calendar	辛亥年 (Metal Pig); 3649 or 3442 — to — 壬子年 (Water Rat); 3650 or 3443
Coptic calendar	668–669
Discordian calendar	2118
Ethiopian calendar	944–945
Hebrew calendar	4712–4713
- Hindu calendars
Vikram Samvat	1008–1009
Shaka Samvat	873–874
Kali Yuga	4052–4053
Holocene calendar	10952
Iranian calendar	330–331
Islamic calendar	340–341
Japanese calendar	Tenryaku 6 (天暦６年)
Javanese calendar	852–853
Julian calendar	952; CMLII
Korean calendar	3285
Minguo calendar	960 before ROC 民前960年
Nanakshahi calendar	−516
Seleucid era	1263/1264 AG
Thai solar calendar	1494–1495
Tibetan calendar	ལྕགས་མོ་ཕག་ལོ་ (female Iron-Boar); 1078 or 697 or −75 — to — ཆུ་ཕོ་བྱི་བ་ལོ་ (male Water-Rat); 1079 or 698 or −74

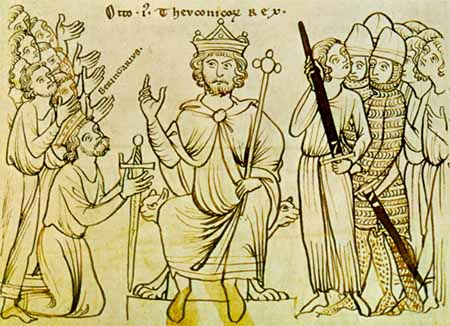
Berengar of Ivrea (left) bows to Otto I.

Year 952 (CMLII) was a leap year starting on Thursday of the Julian calendar.

== Events ==
=== By place ===
==== Europe ====
- Summer – At the Reichstag in Augsburg (assembled by King Otto I), joined by German nobles and bishops, Berengar of Ivrea pays homage. He becomes a vassal of the East Frankish Kingdom. Otto leaves a strong garrison at Pavia in the hands of his son-in-law Conrad the Red, duke of Lotharingia.

==== Scotland ====
- King Constantine II dies at the monastery of St. Andrews (where he has been retired since 943). His cousin and ruling monarch, Malcolm I, fights a battle against the Northmen or the Norse–Gaels.

==== Africa ====
- Summer – Kalbid forces under Al-Hasan ibn Ali al-Kalbi (an aristocratic member of the ruling Fatimid Caliphate) sail from Sicily and invade Byzantine Calabria. He attacks several towns, including Gerace and Cassono.

== Births ==
- Adelaide of Aquitaine, French queen consort (or 945)
- Adela of Hamaland, Frankish countess and regent (d. 1021)
- Fakhr al-Dawla, emir of Gurgan and Tabaristan (d. 997)
- Sa'd al-Dawla, Hamdanid emir of Aleppo (d. 991)
- Song, Chinese empress consort (d. 995)

== Deaths ==
- June 15 – Murong Yanchao, Chinese general
- July 17 – Wu Hanyue, Chinese noblewoman (b. 913)
- September 6 – Suzaku, emperor of Japan (b. 923)
- September 10 – Gao Xingzhou, Chinese general (b. 885)
- December 17 – Hugh the Black, duke of Burgundy
- date unknown
  - Alan II (Wrybeard), duke of Brittany
  - Constantine II, king of Alba (Scotland)
  - Li Jianxun, Chinese official and chancellor
  - Mansur ibn Qara-Tegin, Samanid governor
