= 942 =

Calendar year

942 in various calendars
- Gregorian calendar: 942; CMXLII
- Ab urbe condita: 1695
- Armenian calendar: 391; ԹՎ ՅՂԱ
- Assyrian calendar: 5692
- Balinese saka calendar: 863–864
- Bengali calendar: 348–349
- Berber calendar: 1892
- Buddhist calendar: 1486
- Burmese calendar: 304
- Byzantine calendar: 6450–6451
- Chinese calendar: 辛丑年 (Metal Ox); 3639 or 3432 — to — 壬寅年 (Water Tiger); 3640 or 3433
- Coptic calendar: 658–659
- Discordian calendar: 2108
- Ethiopian calendar: 934–935
- Hebrew calendar: 4702–4703
- Hindu calendars
- Vikram Samvat: 998–999
- Shaka Samvat: 863–864
- Kali Yuga: 4042–4043
- Holocene calendar: 10942
- Iranian calendar: 320–321
- Islamic calendar: 330–331
- Japanese calendar: Tengyō 5 (天慶５年)
- Javanese calendar: 842–843
- Julian calendar: 942; CMXLII
- Korean calendar: 3275
- Minguo calendar: 970 before ROC 民前970年
- Nanakshahi calendar: −526
- Seleucid era: 1253/1254 AG
- Thai solar calendar: 1484–1485
- Tibetan calendar: ལྕགས་མོ་གླང་ལོ་ (female Iron-Ox); 1068 or 687 or −85 — to — ཆུ་ཕོ་སྟག་ལོ་ (male Water-Tiger); 1069 or 688 or −84

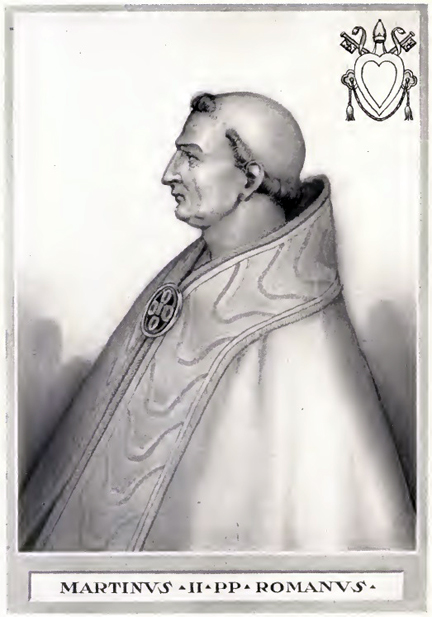
Pope Marinus II (r. 942–946)

Year 942 (CMXLII) was a common year starting on Saturday of the Julian calendar.

== Events ==
=== By place ===
==== Europe ====
- Summer – The Hungarians invade Al-Andalus (modern Spain) and besiege the fortress city of Lerida. They devastate Cerdanya and Huesca, and capture Yahya ibn Muhammad ibn al Tawil, Umayyad governor (wali) of the town of Barbastro. Lacking food stores and sufficient forage, the Hungarians retreat to the Gothic March.
- Battle of Fraxinet: King Hugh of Provence launches an attack on Fraxinet, the Moorish fortress on the Côté d'Azur that had taken control of the Piedmontese valleys. With the assistance of a Byzantine fleet sent by Emperor Romanos I, Hugh lays siege to the Moorish fortress with the help of Hungarian auxiliary troops (Kabars).
- Fall – Hugh of Provence makes a truce with the Moors of Fraxinet, after hearing the news that a Swabian army is about to descend on Italy. He allows the Moors to attack the Alpine passes for his own political ends in his struggle with Berengar of Ivrea. The Byzantines cry foul and end their alliance with Hugh.
- December 17 – William I ("Longsword"), duke of Normandy, is ambushed and assassinated by supporters of Arnulf I ("the Great"), count of Flanders, while the two are at a peace conference at Picquigny (on an island on the Somme) to settle their differences. William is succeeded by his 9-year-old son Richard.
- Winter – The Hungarians raid Friuli and descend into central Italy. Hugh of Provence grants them a large sum of tribute if they return to the Gothic March or Spain. The Hungarians refuse the offer and raid the countryside of Lazio, destroying the region of Sabina.

==== England ====
- King Edmund I moves with his army north to reconquer the Five Boroughs (the five main towns of Danish Mercia) in modern-day East Midlands from the Norse-Irish king Olaf Sigtryggsson.
- Idwal Foel, king of Gwynedd, openly rebels against the overlordship of Edmund I. He and Llywelyn ap Merfyn, king of Pows, are killed fighting the English forces.
- Hywel Dda, king of Deheubarth, annexes Gwynedd and Powys, to become the sole ruler of most of Wales.

==== Asia ====
- Mularaja, founder of the Chaulukya Dynasty, supplants the last Chavda ruler, Samanta-Simha, in Gujarat (modern India). He founds an independent kingdom with his capital in Anahilapataka (approximate date).

=== By topic ===
==== Religion ====
- Fall – Pope Stephen VIII tries to negotiate a peace that will end the feud between Alberic II, de facto ruler of Rome, and Hugh of Provence (his stepfather) but he dies after a 3-year reign. Stephen is succeeded by Marinus II as the 128th pope of the Catholic Church.

== Births ==
- March 7 – Mu'ayyad al-Dawla, ruler of the Buyid Dynasty (d. 983)
- Fujiwara no Tamemitsu, Japanese statesman (d. 992)
- Genshin, Japanese Tendai scholar (d. 1017)
- Liu Chang, emperor of Southern Han (d. 980)
- Sabuktigin, emir of Ghazna (approximate date)
- Sabur ibn Ardashir, Persian statesman (d. 1025)
- Sŏ Hŭi, Korean politician and diplomat (d. 998)
- Sviatoslav I, Grand Prince of Kiev (approximate date)
- Wang, empress of the Song Dynasty (d. 963)

== Deaths ==
- January 21 – An Chongrong, Chinese general (Five Dynasties)
- February 13 – Muhammad ibn Ra'iq, Abbasid de facto regent
- June 10 – Liu Yan, emperor of Southern Han (b. 889)
- July 28 – Shi Jingtang, emperor of Later Jin (b. 892)
- August 24 – Liu, empress dowager of Later Jin
- November 18 – Odo of Cluny, Frankish abbot
- December 17 – William I, duke of Normandy (b.c. 893)
- An Congjin, Chinese general and governor
- Fulk I, Frankish nobleman (approximate date)
- Idwal Foel, king of Gwynedd (Wales)
- Llywelyn ap Merfyn, king of Powys (Wales)
- Pietro Participazio, doge of Venice (Italy)
- Saadia Gaon, Jewish philosopher and exegete
- Stephen VIII, pope of the Catholic Church
- Theobald the Elder, Frankish nobleman (b. 854)
- Wigred, bishop of Chester-le-Street (approximate date)
- Wynsige, bishop of Dorchester (approximate date)
