= 1061 =

1061 in various calendars
- Gregorian calendar: 1061; MLXI
- Ab urbe condita: 1814
- Armenian calendar: 510; ԹՎ ՇԺ
- Assyrian calendar: 5811
- Balinese saka calendar: 982–983
- Bengali calendar: 467–468
- Berber calendar: 2011
- English Regnal year: N/A
- Buddhist calendar: 1605
- Burmese calendar: 423
- Byzantine calendar: 6569–6570
- Chinese calendar: 庚子年 (Metal Rat); 3758 or 3551 — to — 辛丑年 (Metal Ox); 3759 or 3552
- Coptic calendar: 777–778
- Discordian calendar: 2227
- Ethiopian calendar: 1053–1054
- Hebrew calendar: 4821–4822
- Hindu calendars
- Vikram Samvat: 1117–1118
- Shaka Samvat: 982–983
- Kali Yuga: 4161–4162
- Holocene calendar: 11061
- Igbo calendar: 61–62
- Iranian calendar: 439–440
- Islamic calendar: 452–453
- Japanese calendar: Kōhei 4 (康平４年)
- Javanese calendar: 964–965
- Julian calendar: 1061; MLXI
- Korean calendar: 3394
- Minguo calendar: 851 before ROC 民前851年
- Nanakshahi calendar: −407
- Seleucid era: 1372/1373 AG
- Thai solar calendar: 1603–1604
- Tibetan calendar: ལྕགས་ཕོ་བྱི་བ་ལོ་ (male Iron-Rat); 1187 or 806 or 34 — to — ལྕགས་མོ་གླང་ལོ་ (female Iron-Ox); 1188 or 807 or 35

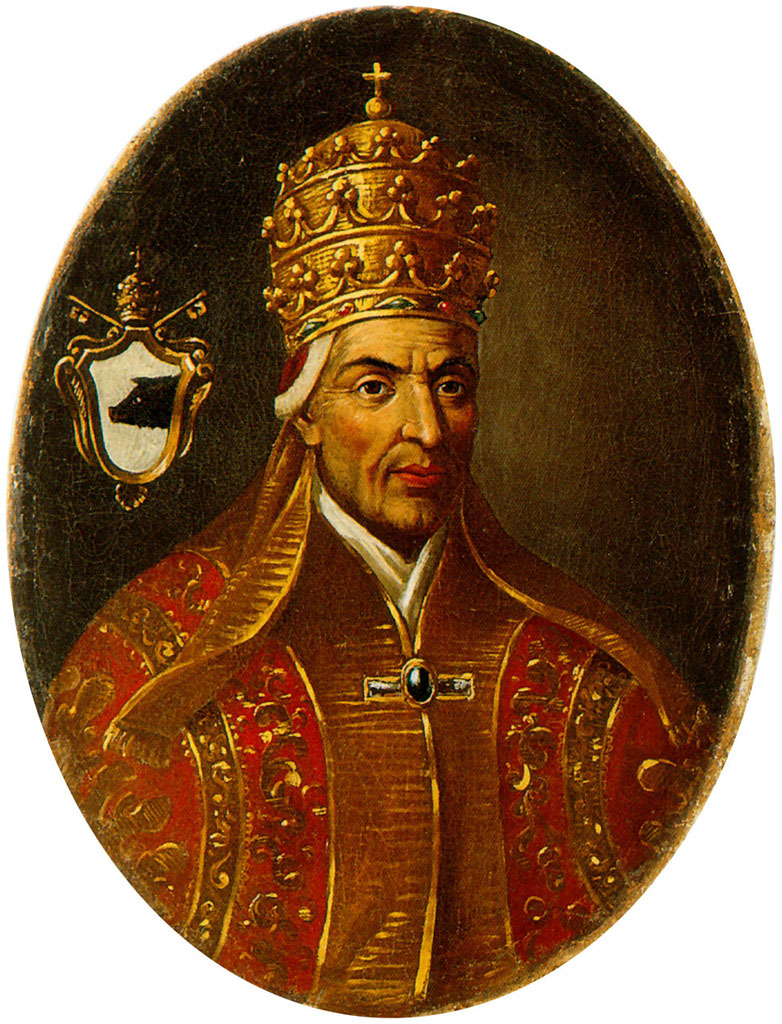
Pope Alexander II (r. 1061–1073)

Year 1061 (MLXI) was a common year starting on Monday of the Julian calendar.

== Events ==
=== By place ===
==== Europe ====
- Spring – Robert de Grandmesnil, his nephew Berengar, half-sister Judith (future wife of Roger I), and eleven monks of the Abbey of Saint-Evroul, are banished by Duke William II ("the Bastard") of Normandy for violence, and travel to Southern Italy.
- Summer – Norman forces led by Duke Robert Guiscard and his brother Roger I invade Sicily. They land unseen during the night and surprise the Saracen army. Guiscard conquers Messina and marches into central Sicily.
- June 28 – Count Floris I is ambushed on a retreat from Zaltbommel and killed by German troops at Nederhemert. Most of West Frisia (later part of the County of Holland) is conquered and annexed by the Holy Roman Empire.
- Sosols (a tribe in Estonia) destroy the Kievan Rus' fortification of Yuryev in Tartu, and carry out a raid on Pskov.

==== Africa ====
- Abu Bakr ibn Umar of Almoravids, appoints Yusuf ibn Tashfin as steward of Sous and northern provinces, while campaigning in the southern provinces. Upon his return, daunted by Yusuf's new-found power, Abu Bakr sees any attempts at recapturing his post as politically unfeasible and returns to the fringes of the Sahara to settle the unrest of the southern frontier.

=== By topic ===
==== Religion ====
- July 27 – Pope Nicholas II dies after a 2-year pontificate at Florence. He is succeeded by Alexander II as the 156th pope of the Catholic Church in Rome.
- The Speyer Cathedral is consecrated in Speyer (modern Germany).

== Births ==
- Al-Maziri, Zirid imam, jurist and scholar (d. 1141)
- Al-Tughrai, Persian poet and alchemist (d. 1121)
- Roger Borsa, duke of Apulia and Calabria (or 1060)
- Wuyashu, chieftain of the Wanyan tribe (d. 1113)

== Deaths ==
- January 28 – Spytihněv II, duke of Bohemia (b. 1031)
- May 5 – Humbert of Moyenmoutier, French cardinal
- June 28 – Floris I, count of Friesland (west of the Vlie)
- July 13 – Beatrice I, German abbess of Quedlinburg (b. 1037)
- July 27 – Nicholas II, pope of the Catholic Church
- Adelmann, bishop of Brescia (approximate date)
- Ali ibn Ridwan, Arab physician and astronomer (approximate date)
- Burgheard, English nobleman
- Burkhard I, Lord of Zollern (or Burchardus), German nobleman, killed
- Conrad III, Duke of Carinthia (or Konrad), German nobleman
- Gardizi, Persian geographer and historian
- Henry I, Count Palatine of Lotharingia (or Heinrich), German nobleman
- Rajaraja Narendra, Indian ruler (b. 1022)
- Rúaidhri Ua Flaithbheartaigh, Irish king of Iar Connacht, killed
- Song Qi (Zijing), Chinese statesman and historian (b. 998)
