= 1031 =

Calendar year

1031 in various calendars
- Gregorian calendar: 1031; MXXXI
- Ab urbe condita: 1784
- Armenian calendar: 480; ԹՎ ՆՁ
- Assyrian calendar: 5781
- Balinese saka calendar: 952–953
- Bengali calendar: 437–438
- Berber calendar: 1981
- English Regnal year: N/A
- Buddhist calendar: 1575
- Burmese calendar: 393
- Byzantine calendar: 6539–6540
- Chinese calendar: 庚午年 (Metal Horse); 3728 or 3521 — to — 辛未年 (Metal Goat); 3729 or 3522
- Coptic calendar: 747–748
- Discordian calendar: 2197
- Ethiopian calendar: 1023–1024
- Hebrew calendar: 4791–4792
- Hindu calendars
- Vikram Samvat: 1087–1088
- Shaka Samvat: 952–953
- Kali Yuga: 4131–4132
- Holocene calendar: 11031
- Igbo calendar: 31–32
- Iranian calendar: 409–410
- Islamic calendar: 421–423
- Japanese calendar: Chōgen 4 (長元４年)
- Javanese calendar: 933–934
- Julian calendar: 1031; MXXXI
- Korean calendar: 3364
- Minguo calendar: 881 before ROC 民前881年
- Nanakshahi calendar: −437
- Seleucid era: 1342/1343 AG
- Thai solar calendar: 1573–1574
- Tibetan calendar: ལྕགས་ཕོ་རྟ་ལོ་ (male Iron-Horse); 1157 or 776 or 4 — to — ལྕགས་མོ་ལུག་ལོ་ (female Iron-Sheep); 1158 or 777 or 5

The Caliphate of Córdoba (green) ends.

Year 1031 (MXXXI) was a common year starting on Friday of the Julian calendar.

== Events ==
=== By place ===
==== Europe ====
- July 20 – King Robert II (the Pious) dies at Melun, after a 35-year reign. He is succeeded by his 23-year-old son, Henry I, who becomes the sole ruler of France. Henry's mother, Queen dowager Constance of Arles, prefers her third son, Robert, as heir to the throne and, with the help of Count Odo II, begins a war against Henry.
- Summer – After a failed invasion in the previous year, the Holy Roman Empire concludes a peace with the Kingdom of Hungary; Emperor Conrad II is forced to cede the lands between Leitha and Fischa to King Stephen I.
- The Caliphate of Córdoba collapses after years of infighting; the caliphate fractures into a number of independent Muslim taifa (kingdoms). The last Umayyad ruler, Caliph Hisham III, tries to consolidate the caliphate, but his raising of taxes (to pay for mosques) leads to heavy opposition and he is imprisoned by his rivals.
- King Mieszko II is forced to escape Poland after an attack of Grand Prince Yaroslav I ("the Wise") of Kiev, who installs Mieszko's half-brother Bezprym onto the Polish throne.
- France suffers from a famine (until 1033).

==== Middle East ====
- The Byzantine general George Maniakes captures Edessa from the Arab Muslims and stabilizes the eastern frontier.

== Births ==
- March 26 – Malcolm III (Canmore), king of Scotland (d. 1093)
- Hoël II (or Houel), duke of Brittany (approximate date)
- Matilda of Flanders, queen consort of England (d. 1083)
- Muhammad ibn Ammar, Moorish poet and writer (d. 1086)
- Robert of Mortain, Norman nobleman and Earl of Cornwall (d. 1095)
- Roger I (the Great Count), Norman nobleman (d. 1101)
- Shen Kuo, Chinese polymath scientist and engineer (d. 1095)
- Spytihněv II, duke of Bohemia (House of Přemyslid) (d. 1061)

== Deaths ==
- January 1 – William of Volpiano, Italian abbot (b. 962)
- January 5 – Gunnor, duchess consort of Normandy
- April 10 – Liudolf of Lotharingia, German nobleman
- June 17 – Hyeonjong, king of Goryeo (Korea) (b. 992)
- June 25 – Sheng Zong, emperor of the Liao Dynasty (b. 972)
- June 28 – Taira no Tadatsune, Japanese governor (b. 975)
- July 20 – Robert II (the Pious), king of France (b. 972)
- August 20 – Burchard, French archbishop and count
- September 2 – Emeric, Hungarian prince and co-heir
- September 9 – Kang Kam-ch'an, Korean general (b. 948)
- November 29 – Al-Qadir, Abbasid caliph of Baghdad (b. 947)
- Aribo, German archbishop and primate (Primas Germaniae)
- Fadl ibn Muhammad, Shaddadid emir of Ganja (Azerbaijan)
- Qadi 'Abd al-Wahhab, Abbasid scholar and jurist (b. 973)
- Snorri Goði, Icelandic Viking warrior and chieftain (b. 963)
