= 1078 =

1078 in various calendars
Gregorian calendar	1078; MLXXVIII
Ab urbe condita	1831
Armenian calendar	527; ԹՎ ՇԻԷ
Assyrian calendar	5828
Balinese saka calendar	999–1000
Bengali calendar	484–485
Berber calendar	2028
English Regnal year	12 Will. 1 – 13 Will. 1
Buddhist calendar	1622
Burmese calendar	440
Byzantine calendar	6586–6587
Chinese calendar	丁巳年 (Fire Snake); 3775 or 3568 — to — 戊午年 (Earth Horse); 3776 or 3569
Coptic calendar	794–795
Discordian calendar	2244
Ethiopian calendar	1070–1071
Hebrew calendar	4838–4839
- Hindu calendars
Vikram Samvat	1134–1135
Shaka Samvat	999–1000
Kali Yuga	4178–4179
Holocene calendar	11078
Igbo calendar	78–79
Iranian calendar	456–457
Islamic calendar	470–471
Japanese calendar	Jōryaku 2 (承暦２年)
Javanese calendar	982–983
Julian calendar	1078; MLXXVIII
Korean calendar	3411
Minguo calendar	834 before ROC 民前834年
Nanakshahi calendar	−390
Seleucid era	1389/1390 AG
Thai solar calendar	1620–1621
Tibetan calendar	མེ་མོ་སྦྲུལ་ལོ་ (female Fire-Snake); 1204 or 823 or 51 — to — ས་ཕོ་རྟ་ལོ་ (male Earth-Horse); 1205 or 824 or 52

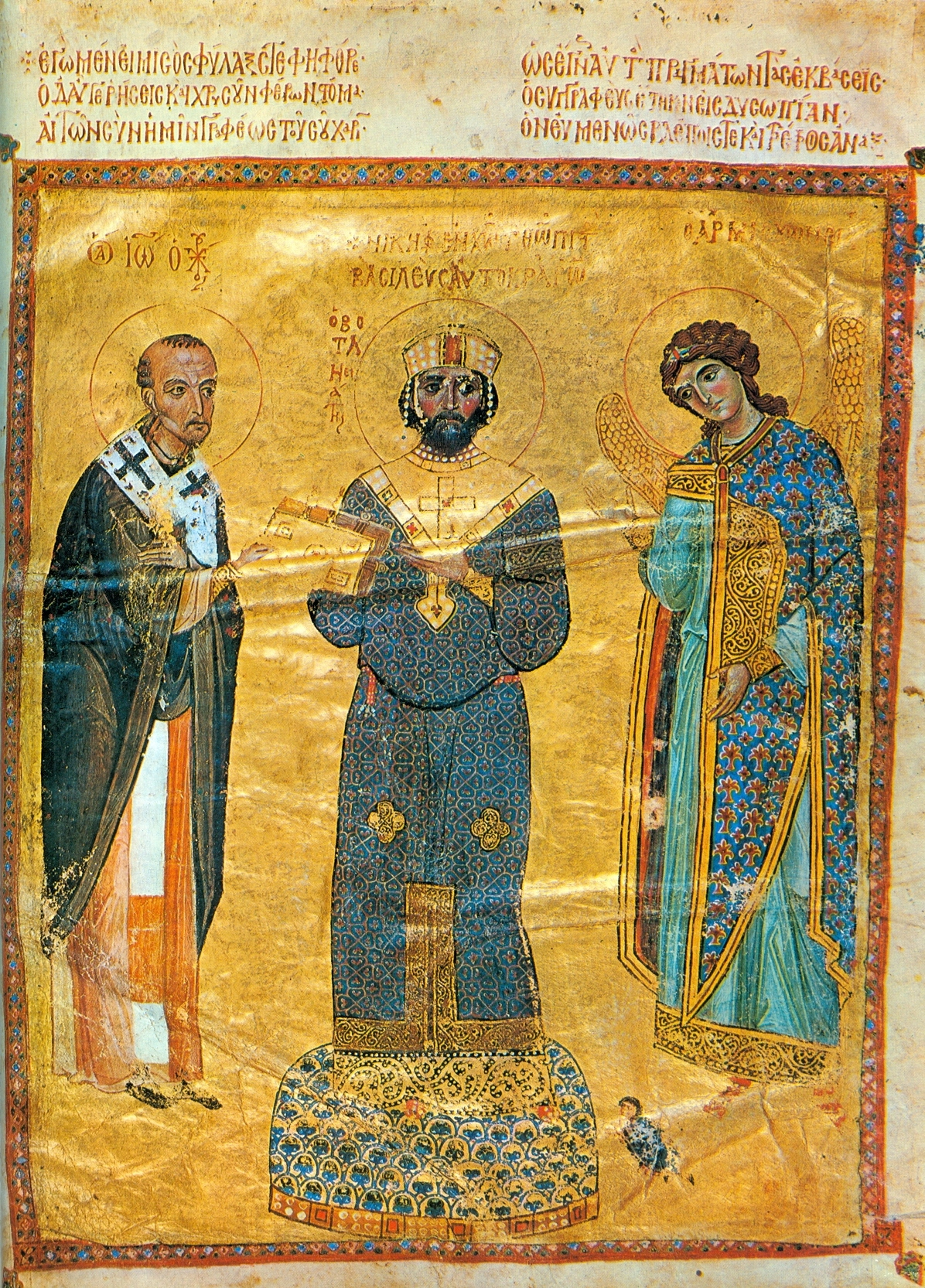
Nikephoros III (middle) (c. 1002–1081)

Year 1078 (MLXXVIII) was a common year starting on Monday of the Julian calendar.

== Events ==
=== By place ===
==== Byzantine Empire ====
- Spring – Nikephoros Botaneiates, a Byzantine general (strategos) of the Theme of the Anatolics, revolts against Emperor Michael VII Doukas. With the support of the Seljuk Turks who provide him with troops, Nikephoros marches upon Nicaea (modern Turkey). He defeats the imperial army and proclaims himself emperor.
- March 24 – Nikephoros Botaneiates enters Constantinople in triumph and is crowned by Patriarch Cosmas I as emperor Nikephoros III of the Byzantine Empire. Michael VII resigns his throne after a 7-year reign and retires into the Monastery of Stoudios.
- Battle of Kalavrye: The imperial forces of General Alexios Komnenos are victorious over the rebellious army (12,000 men) under Nikephoros Bryennios the Elder, governor (doux) of the Theme of Dyrrhachium. Bryennios is captured and later blinded.
- Philaretos Brachamios abandons his claim to the Byzantine throne, on being appointed governor of Antioch, a foundation of the later Armenian Kingdom of Cilicia.

==== Europe ====
- August 7 – Battle of Mellrichstadt: Emperor Henry IV defeats the German anti-king Rudolf of Rheinfelden, duke of Swabia, near Mellrichstadt (modern Germany).
- October 3 – Grand Prince Iziaslav I dies, and is succeeded by Vsevolod I, who unites the principalities – Kiev, Chernigov and Pereyaslavl – in Kievan Rus'.

==== England ====
- Approximate date – The White Tower of the Tower of London is begun, under the direction of Gundulf (or Gundulph), bishop of Rochester.

==== Africa ====
- The Almoravid emir, Yusuf ibn Tashfin, besieges Ceuta. Since the city can receive help from the sea, the siege will last until 1083.

==== China ====
- By this year, the iron industry in the Song dynasty is producing a total weight of 127,000,000 kg (125,000 t) of iron product per year.

=== By topic ===
==== Religion ====
- July 11 – The Romanesque tympanum of Santiago de Compostela Cathedral in Galicia (Spain) is constructed.
- Anselm is elected abbot of Bec Abbey, in Normandy.
- A church council in Poitiers deposes Bishop Sylvester of Rennes who had bought his office in 1076. This leads also to the flight of Robert of Arbrissel to Paris where he begins his studies.

== Births ==
- March 17 – Abdul Qadir Gilani, Persian preacher (d. 1166)
- April/May – Al-Mustazhir, Abbasid caliph in Baghdad (d. 1118)
- Constance of France, princess of Antioch (d. 1125)
- Ermengol V, count of Urgell (Catalonia) (d. 1102)
- Fujiwara no Tadazane, Japanese nobleman (d. 1162)
- Ibn Quzman, Moorish poet and writer (d. 1160)
- Reishi, Japanese empress consort (d. 1144)
- Approximate date – Alexander I ("the Fierce"), king of Scotland (d. 1124)

== Deaths ==
- January – Immilla of Turin, Italian noblewoman
- February 20 – Herman, bishop of Salisbury
- May 30 – Gleb Svyatoslavich, Kievan prince
- August 9 – Peter I, Italian nobleman
- August 26 – Herluin, founder of Bec Abbey
- October 3
  - Boris Vyacheslavich, prince of Chernigov
  - Iziaslav I, Grand Prince of Kiev (b. 1024)
- November 6 – Berthold II, duke of Carinthia
- November 11 – Udo, archbishop of Trier
- Andreas (or Andrew), archbishop of Bari, convert to Judaism
- Mu'ayyad fi'l-Din al-Shirazi, Fatimid scholar (b. 1000)
- Nikephoritzes, Byzantine governor
- Rhys ab Owain, Welsh king of Deheubarth
- Richard I (Drengot), prince of Capua
- Tunka Manin, ruler of the Ghana Empire (b. 1010)
- Zeng Gongliang, Chinese scholar and writer (b. 998)
- Zhang Xian, Chinese poet and writer (b. 990)
- Approximate date – Abd al-Qahir al-Jurjani, Persian scholar
