= 995 Balu earthquake =

The 995 Balu earthquake took place in 995 or 996. It reportedly affected the Armenian areas of Balu, Cop'k (or Covk'), Palnatun (or Palin), and the districts of Hasteank and Xorjean.

The areas affected were districts in what is currently the border area between Armenia and Turkey. The primary source for the event is the historian Stepanos Asoghik (10th-11th century) who dates the event to year 444 of the Armenian calendar. This would place the event between 23 March, 995 (at the earliest) to 24 March, 996 (at the latest). According to Asoghik, all the buildings in the affected areas collapsed at the same time.

The same earthquake is described by the historian Ibn Taghribirdi (15th century), who dates the event to Hijri year 385. This would place the event between 4 February 995 (at the earliest) and 21 January 996 (at the latest). According to his description, strong earthquakes caused "the world to shake", and many people died in the ruins.

Balu was later known as Palu, Elazığ, and still exists. Palnatun perhaps corresponds to Palin. The districts of Cop'k, Xorjean, and Xasteang bordered each other. Their location was the area between the modern towns of Erzincan and Diyarbakır.

== Sources ==
- Guidoboni, Emanuela; Traina, Giusto (1995), A new catalogue of earthquakes in the historical Armenian area from antiquity to the 12th century, Annals of Geophysics
