= Abu Sa'id Al-Janadi =

Abu Sa'id Al-Mufaddal ibn Muhammad ibn Ibrahim al-Janadi (Arabic: أبو سعيد المفضل بن محمد بن ابراهيم الجندي, died 920) was an Islamic scholar and muhaddith from Mecca.

== Works ==
- Faḍāʼil Makkah (Arabic: فضائل مكة), The Virtues of Mecca
- Faḍāʼil al-Madīnah (Arabic: فضائل المدينة), The Virtues of Medina: a small treatise that referenced 78 hadiths and athar.
