= 963 =

Calendar year

963 in various calendars
- Gregorian calendar: 963; CMLXIII
- Ab urbe condita: 1716
- Armenian calendar: 412; ԹՎ ՆԺԲ
- Assyrian calendar: 5713
- Balinese saka calendar: 884–885
- Bengali calendar: 369–370
- Berber calendar: 1913
- Buddhist calendar: 1507
- Burmese calendar: 325
- Byzantine calendar: 6471–6472
- Chinese calendar: 壬戌年 (Water Dog); 3660 or 3453 — to — 癸亥年 (Water Pig); 3661 or 3454
- Coptic calendar: 679–680
- Discordian calendar: 2129
- Ethiopian calendar: 955–956
- Hebrew calendar: 4723–4724
- Hindu calendars
- Vikram Samvat: 1019–1020
- Shaka Samvat: 884–885
- Kali Yuga: 4063–4064
- Holocene calendar: 10963
- Iranian calendar: 341–342
- Islamic calendar: 351–352
- Japanese calendar: Ōwa 3 (応和３年)
- Javanese calendar: 863–864
- Julian calendar: 963; CMLXIII
- Korean calendar: 3296
- Minguo calendar: 949 before ROC 民前949年
- Nanakshahi calendar: −505
- Seleucid era: 1274/1275 AG
- Thai solar calendar: 1505–1506
- Tibetan calendar: ཆུ་ཕོ་ཁྱི་ལོ་ (male Water-Dog); 1089 or 708 or −64 — to — ཆུ་མོ་ཕག་ལོ་ (female Water-Boar); 1090 or 709 or −63

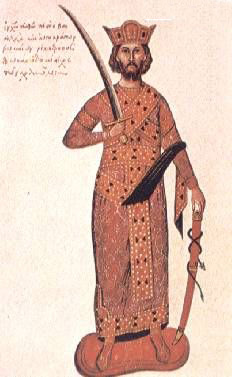
Emperor Nikephoros II (c. 912–969)

Year 963 (CMLXIII) was a common year starting on Thursday of the Julian calendar.

== Events ==
=== By place ===
==== Byzantine Empire ====
- March 15 – Emperor Romanos II dies at age 39, probably of poison administered by his wife, Empress Theophano. He is succeeded by his infant son Basil II. Theophano becomes regent and de facto ruler, naming her other son Constantine VIII (only 3 years old) as co-emperor of the Byzantine Empire.
- July 2 – Nikephoros II Phokas is proclaimed emperor by his troops in Caesarea. He sends a fleet to secure the Bosphorus Strait against his enemies. Chief minister Joseph Bringas gathers support and closes the gates of Constantinople. General Marianos Argyros is killed in a riot, forcing Bringas to flee.
- August 16 – Nikephoros II makes a triumphal entry in Constantinople and is hailed as 'the conqueror'. He is crowned emperor in Hagia Sophia.
- September 20 – Nikephoros II marries the former Byzantine consort Theophano, the widow of Emperor Romanos II, bolstering his legitimacy.

==== Europe ====
- Gero I, margrave of Merseburg, campaigns against the Slavs. He forces Prince Mieszko I of the Polans in Poland to pay tribute to Emperor Otto I ( the Great). He expands his territory, the Marca Geronis (March of Gero), to the mouth of the Oder River.
- Sviatoslav I, Grand Prince of Kyiv, begins a 2-year campaign in which he will defeat Khazar forces along the Don River – vanquish the Ossetes and the Circassians in the northern Caucasus. He also successfully attacks the Bulgars on the Volga River.
- November – Otto arrives at Rome; Pope John XII and Adalbert II (co-ruler of Italy) flee to Campania, taking with them most of the Papal treasury. The Roman citizens warmly receive Otto as a 'liberator'.
- December – King Berengar II (the father of Adalbert II) surrenders at the fortress of Montefeltro to German forces. He and his wife Willa are taken prisoner and dispatched to Bamberg.
- Luxembourg has her beginnings at Luxembourg Castle (located on the Bock), founded by Sigfried, count of the Ardennes.

==== Asia ====
- The Chinese government of the Song Dynasty attempted to ban the practice of cremation; despite this decree, the lower and middle classes continued to cremate their dead until the government resolved the problem in the 12th century, establishing public graveyards for paupers.
- The Nanping State, one of the Ten Kingdoms in south-central China, is forced to surrender, when invaded by armies of the Song Dynasty.

=== By topic ===
==== Religion ====
- November 6 – Synod of Rome: Otto I calls a council at St. Peter's Basilica. John XII is deposed on charges that he has conducted himself dishonorably and instigated an armed rebellion against Otto.
- December 6 – Pope Leo VIII is appointed to the office of Protonotary and begins his papacy as antipope of Rome – a reign with the concurrently deposed John XII.
- The Monastery of Great Lavra at Mount Athos (northeastern Greece) is founded by the Byzantine monk Athanasius the Athonite.

== Births ==
- March 13 – Anna Porphyrogenita, Grand Princess of Kiev (d. 1011)
- April 17 – Sweyn Forkbeard, king of Denmark and Norway (d. 1014)
- Edith of Wilton, English princess and abbess (approximate date)
- Li Jiqian, Chinese governor and rebel leader (d. 1004)
- Nuh II, emir of the Samanid Dynasty (Iran) (d. 997)
- Samsam al-Dawla, Buyid emir (approximate date)
- Snorri Goði, Icelandic Viking chieftain (d. 1031)

== Deaths ==
- March 15 – Romanos II, Byzantine emperor (b. 938)
- March 31 – Abu Ja'far Ahmad ibn Muhammad, Saffarid emir (b. 906)
- April 3 – William III, duke of Aquitaine (b. 915)
- April 10 – Oda of Metz, German noblewoman
- April 16 – William I, German nobleman
- April 18 – Stephen Lekapenos, Byzantine co-emperor
- August 16 – Marianos Argyros, Byzantine general
- Abu Muhammad al-Hasan, Buyid vizier
- Alp-Tegin, Samanid commander-in-chief
- Donnchad mac Cellacháin, king of Munster (Ireland)
- Fothad I, bishop of St. Andrews (approximate date)
- Goltregoda, Frankish countess and regent (b. 920)
- Ingeborg Tryggvasdotter, Viking noblewoman
- John II, duke of Gaeta (Italy) (approximate date)
- Michael Maleinos, Byzantine monk (approximate date)
- Ordoño IV (the Bad), king of León (or 962)
- Rudolfe II (or Raoul), Frankish nobleman
- Tryggve Olafsson, Norse Viking king
- Wang, empress of the Song Dynasty (b. 942)
