= Reginold of Eichstätt =

Reginold of Eichstätt (died 4 April 991 in Eichstätt) was Bishop of Eichstätt from 966 to 991, much 'admired as a poet, musician, scholar and orator' and indeed 'the leading musician of his age'.

He had travelled in the East, and his knowledge of the classical languages Latin, Greek and Hebrew (as cited 100 years later by the chronicler of Eichstätt's history, Anonymous of Herrieden) enabled him to create religious works that found widespread popularity. In particular, his Historia of Saint Nicholas (a collection of anthems, antiphons, responsories, lections and prayers designed to be recited throughout the day on the saint's feast day, in a Liturgy of the Hours) was 'artistically exceptional' and 'swept the world like a catchy new tune', as innovation had been subdued under Charlemagne but was just beginning to take off once again. He demonstrated his linguistic versatility by switching from language to language within the text. This Historia also earned Reginold the bishopric, which was awarded to him by the Holy Roman Emperor Otto the Great. The plainchant music, however, was written in neumes which are inherently ambiguous, so no definitive modern version exists. Reginold also composed Historiae in honour of Saint Willibald, Winibald and Saint Blaise.
