= Marino Cassianico =

Italian Roman Catholic bishop

Marino Cassianico (died 992) was an Italian Roman Catholic bishop.

Born in Veneto, Marino Cassianico was named bishop of the Patriarch of Olivolo or Rialto, Italy in 966 and died in 992 while still in office.
