= Fujiwara no Nakafumi =

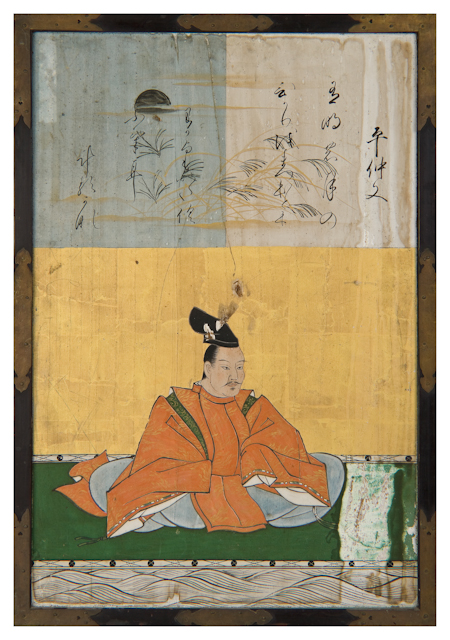
Taira no Nakafumi (sic!) by Kanō Yasunobu, 1648

Fujiwara no Nakafumi (also Nakafun, 923–992, Japanese: 藤原 仲文) was a middle Heian waka poet and Japanese nobleman. He was designated a member of the Thirty-six Poetry Immortals.

Nakafumi's poems are included in several imperial poetry anthologies, including Chokusen Wakashū. A personal poetry collection known as the Nakafumishū also remains.
