= Suero Gundemáriz =

Leonese count

Suero Gundemáriz (Note: Gundemáriz is a patronymic surname. It indicates that his father was named Gundemaro. In contemporary Latin sources, his name is usually spelled Suarius Gundemariz (var. Gondemari, Gondaemariz, Gundimariz).) (flourished 968–991) was a Leonese count in the region of Galicia, notable mainly for leading the region in rebellion. He was married to Teodegonza, (Note: She was nicknamed (cognomento) Gonzina (var. Goncina, Guncina).) a relative of Rudesind, founder of the monastery of Celanova. He was probably a brother of Piniolo Gundemáriz and thus an uncle of Count Gundemaro Pinióliz.

Little is known of Suero's early life. His earliest appearance in the historical record is as a witness in a document of 968 pertaining to the monastery of Sobrado. He attended the court of King Ramiro III in 974, witnessing two royal diplomas. In 985–86, he witnessed five diplomas of King Vermudo II, all pertaining to churches in León proper and Galicia. His interests clearly lay in eastern Galicia; and not a single document places him in Portugal. (Note: In the words of Pérez de Urbel, he was "more Asturian-Galician than Galician-Portuguese" (astur-galaico más que galaico-portugués).)

In 986, Suero led a revolt against the King Vermudo II. He was joined by Count Gonzalo Menéndez and Osorio Díaz. This rebellion disturbed a peace which, as King Vermudo had proudly declared, reigned throughout the length and breadth of the kingdom as of 1 January 986. It also coincided with an invasion from the south by the Caliphate under al-Mansur. During the revolt, Suero managed to build a villa without royal permission at Veyga on the river Miño. In 994, after Suero's death, King Vermudo gave the villa to the monastery of Celanova. In documenting this gift, the king recorded how Suero, "puffed up with pride and led by a malicious spirit, rebelled against me and disturbed my land and my rights equally and my castles too, as did his other accomplices, whom he led against me." (Note: Superbia elatus et spiritu malicie ductus, revelavit mihi et disturbavit meam terram et meum debitum pariter et meos castellos etiam et alios sibi complices fecit, et mihi contrarios duxit.) A document dated 1032, from the reign of King Vermudo III, describes the revolt led by Suero during the time of his grandfather (Vermudo II). It says that Suero held the fortress of Lugo and that the rebels built many illegal castles, all of which save for Lapio (now Labio) were torn down after the rebellion was defeated. (Note: "an army gathered and came to this fortress Lugo and stayed there many days" (exercitu aggregato venit in isto opido Luco, ubi multis diebus commoravit))

Suero made his peace with the king in 988, and was re-admitted to the royal court. Despite the fact that his rebellion was remembered for decades on account of its gravity, he was shown tremendous leniency, although his lands were at least partially confiscated. On 23 December 988, in a royal diploma for Celanova, he appears atop the list of lay witnesses. On 1 March 991, in his last appearance in the records, he confirms Vermudo II's grant of the conmiso (district) of Mera to the cathedral of Lugo. He died later that year. On 10 August 992, some estates that had been confiscated after the rebellion were conferred on his widow. His widow was alive as late as 18 December 1016, when she donated half the villa of Meilán to the cathedral of Lugo. One of Suero's nephews, Rodrigo Romániz, led a rebellion from the region of Monterroso during the reign of King Vermudo III, and seized the castle of Lapio.

== Sources ==
- Carriedo Tejedo, Manuel (2007). "La familia de San Rosendo" (PDF). Estudios Mindonienses. 23: 103–23. Archived from the original (PDF) on 2016-03-24.
- González López, Emilio (1978). Grandeza e decadencia do reino de Galicia. Translated by Francisco Fernández del Riego. Vigo: Editorial Galaxia.
- López Ferreiro, Antonio (1899). Historia de la Santa A. M. Iglesia de Santiago de Compostela. Vol. II. Santiago de Compostela: Imp. y Enc. del Seminario Conciliar Central. OCLC 932806777.
- Pérez, Mariel (2011). "Rebelles, infideles, traditores: Insumisión política y poder aristocrático en el Reino de León" (PDF). Historia, Instituciones, Documentos. 38: 261–82.
- Pérez de Urbel, Justo (1945). Historia del Condado de Castilla. Vol. II. Madrid: Consejo Superior de Investigaciones Científicas.
- Pick, Lucy K. (2002). "Dominissima, prudentissima: Elvira, First Queen-Regent of León". In Thomas E. Burman; Mark D. Meyerson; Leah Shopkow (eds.). Religion, Text, and Society in Medieval Spain and Northern Europe: Essays in Honor of J. N. Hillgarth. Toronto: Pontifical Institute of Mediaeval Studies. pp. 38–69.
- Portela, Ermelindo (2015). "The Making of Galicia in Feudal Spain (1065–1157)". In James D'Emilio (ed.). Culture and Society in Medieval Galicia: A Cultural Crossroads at the Edge of Europe. Leiden: Brill. pp. 367–99.
- Salazar y Acha, Jaime de (1985). "Una familia de la alta edad media: los Velas y su realidad histórica". Estudios Genealógicos y Heráldicos. Vol. 1. pp. 19–64.
