= Pilgrim (given name) =

Pilgrim (or Piligrim, from Latin Peregrinus, Pellegrinus, etc.) is a given name. It may refer to:

- Pilgrim I (archbishop of Salzburg) (died 923)
- Pilgrim (bishop of Passau) (died 991)
- Pilgrim (archbishop of Cologne) (died 1036)
- Pellegrinus I of Aquileia (died 1161), also called Pilgrim of Ortenburg, patriarch of Aquileia
- Pellegrino II of Aquileia (died 1204), patriarch of Aquileia
- Pilgram Marpeck (died 1556), Anabaptist leader in southern Germany
- Pilgrim von Puchheim (died 1396), archbishop of Salzburg
