= Landulf of Carcano =

Landulf of Carcano (died 998) was the archbishop of Milan, as Landulf II, from 979 until his death.

According to the 11th-century Milanese chronicler Landulf of Milan, Landulf came to power in Milan through "the wicked designs of his father", Bonizo, who had governed Milan during the time of Otto I, "as a local count overseeing a castrum [castle]". When the previous archbishop, Godfrey I, died on 19 September 979, Bonizo installed his son as bishop "against the will of every order of cleric". After Bonizo was murdered in bed by his slave, Landulf was forced to flee to the court of Otto II. Otto led an army "of barbarians", according to the chronicler, against Milan, but Landulf made an agreement with the leading men of the city and prevented bloodshed.

The later capitanei of Milan, the "nobles [vassals of the archbishop] whose estates lay in the countryside just outside the city", claimed to derive their rights from this episode. Landulf is said to have invested them as "greater knights" (milites majores). According to the eleventh-century historian Arnulf of Milan, Landulf re-establish "perpetual peace" (pax perpetua) by enfeoffing the capitanei with ecclesiastical property. Landulf of Milan castigates the archbishop for being as "wicked as a scorpion" (iniquus velut scorpio) in alienating church lands.

Landulf gave jobs to persons of the "popular" (i.e., lower) class, leading to tension with the civic leaders. In 983 Landulf was exiled from the city and had to make many concessions to the aristocracy to be allowed to return.

In 996, Landulf founded the monastery of San Celso in Milan.

== Sources ==
- Murray, Alexander (2002). Reason and Society in the Middle Ages. Oxford: Clarendon Press.
- Stock, Brian (1983). The Implications of Literacy: Written Language and Models of Interpretation in the Eleventh and Twelfth Centuries. Princeton: Princeton University Press.
- Wickham, Chris (1981). Early Medieval Italy: Central Power and Local Society, 400–1000. London: Macmillan.
