= 991 Damascus earthquake =

Earthquake in Syria

Coordinates: 33.2°N 36.2°E

The 991 Damascus earthquake took place in the city of Damascus on 5 April, 991 (17th Muharram, Hijri year 381).

According to historian George Elmacin (13th century), the earthquake caused the fall of 1000 houses in Damascus itself, and many people were trapped in their ruins and died. The village of Beglabec was reportedly engulfed due to the earthquake.

According to Elmacin, aftershocks continued until 3 May, 991 (14th Safar, Hijri year 381).

The geophysicist August Heinrich Sieberg (20th century) estimated that this earthquake caused a "seismic sea wave" (tsunami) which flooded the coasts of the region of Syria. Sieberg did not name a primary source for his estimation.

The historians Pierre Vattier(17th century) and Marcello Bonito (17th century) mention the earthquake, but not the tsunami.

== Sources ==
- Antonopoulos, J. (1980), Data from investigation of seismic Sea waves events in the Eastern Mediterranean from 500 to 1000 A.D., Annals of Geophysics
- Ben-Meneham, Ari (10 November 1991), "Four thousand years of seismicity along the Dead Sea Rift", Journal of Geophysical Research, 96 (B12): 20195–20216, Bibcode:1991JGR....9620195B, doi:10.1029/91JB01936
