= Fujiwara no Michimasa =

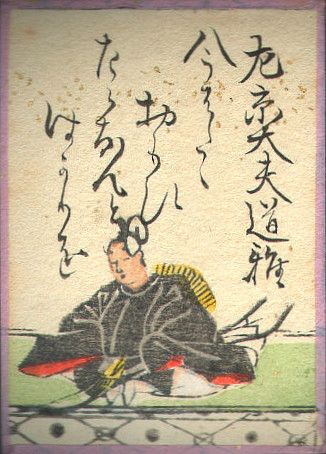
- Michimasa Hyakunin Isshu
- Born: 992
- Died: August 25, 1054
- Parents: Father：Fujiwara no Korechika、Mother：Minamoto no Shigemitsu's Daughter

Fujiwara no Michimasa (藤原 道雅、ふじわらのみちまさ）) was a mid-Heian period Imperial court noble and poet. He is included in the Hyakunin Isshu and was the nephew of Emperor Ichijo's wife, Empress Fujiwara no Teishi.

== Career ==
Raised by his grandfather, Fujiwara no Michitaka, who died in 995. His father, Fujiwara no Korechika, was promoted to Minister of the Interior (Naidaijin) the following year, but following an incident in which an arrow was shot at Emperor Kazan, he was demoted to the post of governor of Dazai. Michimasa lived during the downfall of his family's fortunes.

In 1004, at the age of 14, he was conferred with the rank of Junior fifth rank lower. In 1011, he became a servant of the future Emperor Ichijo. In 1015 he became Lieutenant of the Guard for the Left. In 1016, at the time of Emperor Ichijo's accession to the throne, he was promoted to lower third rank. However, he was dismissed 8 days after taking up his new post. Furthermore, in September of the same year, when escorting the Imperial Princess Masako to Ise to become the sacred maiden, their affair was made known to her father the Retired Emperor Sanjo, who censured Michimasa heavily. According to the Eiga monogatari, Masako took the tonsure before her father's death, but according to the Shōyūki (小右記), she took the tonsure on November 13, 1017, six months after her father's death. On December 6, 1024, Emperor Kazan's daughter, Jōtomo-In was murdered in the night and her body was discovered the following morning. The following year a suspect was caught; however, the suspect confessed that he killed her on Michimasa's orders. The following year 1026, with the case still undecided, Michimasa was demoted from his posts. In July 1054 he took the tonsure and died shortly after.

== Life ==
Though he was described as a violent man in the Shōyūki, five of his poems were included in the Goshūi Wakashū and two were included in the Shika Wakashū, both Imperial anthologies.

His poem included in the Hyakunin Isshu is commonly interpreted as Michimasa's response to being barred from visiting the Imperial Princess Masako after her father learned of their affair.

Now, the only thing
I wish for is a way to say
to you directly
--not through another--
'I will think of you no longer!'

— Hyakunin Isshu, poem 63

Michimasa's relationship with the former Ise Priestess is mentioned in the Eiga monogatari in several places. The narrator draws a parallel between Ariwara no Narihira's relationship with a serving Ise priestess and Michimasa and Masako's relationship. However, the narrator points out that as Masako was no longer serving it was not as great an offense.

== Links ==
- Poem by Sakyô no Dayû Michimasa, from the series One Hundred Poems by One Hundred Poets at Museum of Fine Arts, Boston
