= 1030s =

Decade

The 1030s was a decade of the Julian Calendar which began on January 1, 1030, and ended on December 31, 1039.

== Events ==
=== 1030 ===
==== By place ====
====== Byzantine Empire ======
- Emperor Romanos III Argyros decides to retaliate upon the incursions of the Muslims on the eastern frontier. He leads a Byzantine expeditionary force (20,000 men) to secure Antioch. The Mirdasid emir Shibl al-Dawla Nasr of Aleppo sues for peace, but Romanos refuses to negotiate and leads his army against Aleppo, against the advice of his generals. The Byzantine army encamped near Azaz, where they were encircled by the Mirdasids' Bedouin troops, who cut off the Byzantines from food and water.
- August 10 – Romanos orders a retreat to Antioch. As the army is exhausted from the heat and the lack of supplies, the retreat soon turns into a flight in panic. Romanos returns to Constantinople in humiliation, but his generals on the eastern frontier manage to salvage the situation: a Fatimid attack on Maraclea is repulsed, and Azaz itself is captured in December after a brief siege. In April/May 1031, Emir Nasr of Aleppo agreed to vassal and tributary status with Byzantium.

====== Europe ======
- June – Emperor Conrad II (the Elder) leads an invasion into Hungary. He plunders the lands west of the River Rába but suffers from the consequences of the scorched earth tactics used by the Hungarians. Conrad, threatened by starvation, is forced to retreat to Germany. King Stephen I pursued his forces, which were defeated and captured by the Hungarians at Vienna.
- July 29 – Battle of Stiklestad: King Olaf II Haraldsson (St. Olaf) attempts to reconquer Norway with help from King Anund Jakob of Sweden. He is defeated by a superior Norwegian peasant and Danish army (14,000 men). Olaf is killed in the battle. He is later canonized and becomes the patron saint of Norway and Rex perpetuum Norvegiae ('the eternal king of Norway').
- The first mention is made of Tartu, Estonia, as Grand Prince Yaroslav I (the Wise) of Novgorod and Kyiv defeats the Estonians and finds a fort named Yuryev (modern-day Tartu). The Rus' will hold the fortress for 30 or 31 years.
- The first mention is made of Thalwil, Switzerland, derived from Tellewilare and indicates the early medieval origins of Thalwil as an Alemannic farmstead.
- Henry I revolts against his father, King Robert II (the Pious), in a civil war over power and property. Robert's army is defeated, and he retreats to Beaugency.

====== Asia ======
- April 30 – Sultan Mahmud of Ghazni dies after a 28-year reign. He is succeeded by his son Mas'ud I, who seizes the throne of the Ghaznavid Empire, which includes much of Afghanistan, Iran, and India.
- Ouyang Xiu, a Chinese historian and scholar, obtained his jinshi degree at the age of 23, by passing the imperial examinations in the country, leading him to a distinguished path as a scholar-official.

=== 1031 ===
==== By place ====
====== Europe ======
- July 20 – King Robert II (the Pious) dies at Melun, after a 35-year reign. He is succeeded by his 23-year-old son, Henry I, who becomes the sole ruler of France. Henry's mother, Queen dowager Constance of Arles, prefers her third son, Robert, as heir to the throne and, with the help of Count Odo II, begins a war against Henry.
- The Caliphate of Córdoba collapses after years of infighting; the caliphate fractures into a number of independent Muslim taifa (kingdoms). The last Umayyad ruler, Caliph Hisham III, tries to consolidate the caliphate, but his raising of taxes (to pay for mosques) leads to heavy opposition and he is imprisoned by his rivals.
- King Mieszko II is forced to escape Poland after an attack of Grand Prince Yaroslav I (the Wise) of Kyiv, who installs Mieszko's half-brother Bezprym onto the Polish throne.
- France suffers from a famine (until 1033).

====== Middle East ======
- The Byzantine general George Maniakes captures Edessa from the Arab Muslims and stabilizes the eastern frontier.

=== 1032 ===
==== By place ====
====== Byzantine Empire ======
- Spring – Emperor Romanos III (Argyros) sends a Byzantine expeditionary army under General Michael Protospatharios, which includes Western auxiliaries and elite troops of Asia Minor, to reinforce the Byzantine position in Calabria (Southern Italy).

====== Europe ======
- September 6 – King Rudolph III dies without any heirs. He bequeaths his entire dominions to Emperor Conrad II (the Elder), dispatching to him the Holy Lance and ring of St. Maurice, symbols of Burgundian investiture.
- Odo II, count of Champagne, invades Burgundy and seizes most of the kingdom for himself. With the assistance of Humbert I of Savoy, Queen-dowager Ermengarde (Rudolph III's widow) flees to the safety of Zürich.
- Winter – Conrad II marches with his army into Champagne and devastates the land – forcing Odo II to sue for peace and swear to abandon Burgundy. The bishops prevent Conrad from seizing control of Burgundy.
- The first mention is made of Kursk, Russia, in the hagiography of Theodosius, who becomes a monk at the Kiev Caves Monastery (approximate date).

==== By topic ====
====== Religion ======
- October – Pope John XIX dies after an 8-year pontificate at Rome. He is succeeded by his nephew Benedict IX as the 145th pope of the Catholic Church, while (probably) still in his teens.

=== 1033 ===
==== By place ====
====== Asia ======
- December 5 – A major earthquake in the Jordan Valley devastates multiple cities across the Palestine region, killing many people and triggering a tsunami.

====== Europe ======
- February 2 – Emperor Conrad II (the Elder) holds an assembly at the Abbey of Payerne and is crowned King of Burgundy. He claims dominion over the Kingdom of Burgundy which is incorporated into the Holy Roman Empire.
- Treaty of Merseburg: Conrad II attends a Hoftag at Merseburg and signs an agreement with King Mieszko II. He divides Poland in three parts with Mieszko designated as supreme ruler, in exchange for Conrad's support.

==== By topic ====
====== Religion ======
- Panic spreads throughout Europe that the end of the universe may be near, on the 1,000th anniversary of the crucifixion of Christ, due to some unusually harsh spring weather. The Book of Revelation (Chapter 20) predicts the end of the earth after a 1,000 year period after the second return of Jesus Christ.

=== 1034 ===
==== By place ====
====== Byzantine Empire ======
- April 11 – Emperor Romanos III (Argyros) is drowned in his bath, at the urging of his wife Zoë, who marries her chamberlain, and elevates him to the throne of the Byzantine Empire, as Michael IV. Romanos is buried in the Church of St. Mary Peribleptos in Constantinople.

====== Europe ======
- Spring – Emperor Conrad II (the Elder) leads a German military expedition via the Rhone River into Burgundy, while two Italian armies led by Archbishop Aribert and Boniface III (margrave of Tuscany) head over the Alps and join with Count Humbert I at Great St. Bernard Pass.
- March – Conrad II converges his armies on Lake Lemano and defeats Count Odo II in battle at Geneva (modern Switzerland). For his assistance, Conrad grants Humbert I with the Burgundian county of Maurienne.
- May – King Mieszko II dies after a 6-year reign (probably killed as a result of a conspiracy) and is succeeded by his 17-year-old son Casimir I (the Restorer). A violent revolt spreads throughout Poland.
- King Sancho III (the Great) of Pamplona captures León, after defeating a string of rivals. His rule now extends from the borders of Galicia in the west to the County of Barcelona in the east.
- Summer – Poland is broken up into regions (during the so-called Pagan Reaction). Queen Richeza, Casimir I and his sisters Ryksa and Gertruda are driven into exile in Germany.
- November 25 – King Malcolm II dies in battle at Glamis. He is succeeded by Duncan I, son of his eldest daughter, rather than Macbeth, who is possibly another grandson of his.
- In Al-Andalus, benefiting from the weakening of the Muslim central authority, the count of Portugal, Gonçalo Maia, conquers Montemor-o-Velho (approximate date).
- Franche-Comté becomes subject to the Holy Roman Empire.

====== Africa ======
- A Pisan and Genovese fleet attack Bona (modern Annaba) on the Maghribi coast (modern Algeria). The city is occupied for one year.

=== 1035 ===
==== By place ====
====== Europe ======
- March 23 – Battle of Cesar (near the village of Cesar, Portugal): The armies of Bermudo III, King of León, defeat the Moorish armies of Abu'l-Qasim, the emir of the Taifa of Seville.
- c. July 3 – 8-year-old William I becomes duke of Normandy after his father Robert I ("the Magnificent") dies on a pilgrimage at Nicaea (modern Turkey). Robert's death leads to a period of instability in Normandy, as William is too young to take his father's place. The Norman nobles in the region take the opportunity to settle old feuds and to increase their private wealth.
- October 16 – Conrad II grants the right to hold the first Freimarkt festival in Bremen. The city increases her trade with Norway, and the northern Netherlands.
- October 18 – King Sancho III of Pamplona dies and divides his dominions among his four sons, García Sánchez III, Gonzalo I, Ferdinand I and Ramiro I.
- Pisa launches a naval assault against Saracen pirate strongholds in the Lipari Islands.
- Emperor Conrad II ("the Elder") grants the city of Koper (modern Slovenia) town rights, and some degree of self-government, within the Holy Roman Empire.

====== England ======
- November 12 – King Cnut the Great dies at Shaftesbury, leaving the rule of England in dispute between his sons Harthacnut and Harold Harefoot. The earls of Northumbria and Mercia support Harold's claim, while Godwin (Earl of Wessex) supports Harthacnut. Harold is elected as regent (or joint ruler) of England. Cnut is buried in the Old Minster, in Winchester.
- Winter – Harthacnut is unable to travel to his coronation in England because his Danish kingdom is under threat of an invasion by King Magnus I of Norway and King Anund Jacob of Sweden.

=== 1036 ===
==== By place ====
====== Europe ======
- Summer – In Naples, Duke Sergius IV abdicates and retires to a monastery; he is succeeded by his son John V.
- A Zirid expeditionary force invades Sicily and takes Palermo from the Normans, but fails to fully reconquer the island.

====== England ======
- February 5 – Edward the Confessor's younger brother Alfred Aetheling is blinded and murdered, in an apparent attempt to seize the throne of England from Harold I.

====== Africa ======
- June 13 – Caliph al-Zahir li-i'zaz Din Allah dies after a 16-year reign. He is succeeded by his 6-year-old son al-Mustansir as ruler of the Fatimid Caliphate. Vizier Ali ibn Ahmad al-Jarjara'i will guide the regency for the first few years.

====== China ======
- The Tangut script is devised by Yeli Renrong, for Emperor Jing Zong of Western Xia.

====== Japan ======
- May 15 – Emperor Go-Ichijō dies at the age of 27 after a 20-year reign. He is succeeded by his brother Go-Suzaku as the 69th emperor of Japan.

==== By topic ====
====== Religion ======
- Pope Benedict IX is briefly forced out of Rome, but returns with the help of the elder Conrad II, Holy Roman Emperor.
- The Flower Sermon first appears in Buddhist literature.

=== 1037 ===
==== By place ====
====== Europe ======
- Spring – A revolt in northern Italy is started by Archbishop Aribert of Milan. King Henry III (eldest son of Emperor Conrad II) travels south of the Alps to quell it.
- February – At an Imperial Diet in Pavia (assembled by Conrad II), Aribert is accused of fomenting a revolt against the Holy Roman Empire, Conrad orders his arrest.
- May – Conrad II, with Pavian assistance, lays siege to Milan at the Porta Romana side, but the city holds out. In Rome, Pope Benedict IX deposes Aribert as archbishop.
- May 28 – Conrad II decrees the Constitutio de Feudis which protects the rights of the valvassores (knights and burghers of the cities) in Lombardia (modern Italy).
- Summer – A Byzantine expeditionary force under George Maniakes lands at Sicily, and defeats the Zirids. Maniakes begins his campaign to reconquer the island.
- September 4 – Battle of Tamarón: Ferdinand I defeats and kills his brother-in-law Bermudo III. Ferdinand becomes the king of Castile and León (modern Spain).
- November 15 – Battle of Bar-le-Duc: Odo II, Count of Blois and Champagne, while invading the Duchy of Lorraine dies in battle with forces loyal to Gothelo I.

====== England ======
- King Harold I seizes the throne of England from his half-brother Harthacnut. His mother, Emma of Normandy, flees to Bruges in Flanders (modern Belgium).

====== Asia ======
- The Chinese rime dictionary of the Jiyun is published during the Song Dynasty.

=== 1038 ===
==== By place ====
====== Europe ======
- August 15 – On the death of his uncle, Stephen I, Peter Orseolo becomes the second ruler of Hungary.
- August – A battle occurs near the town of Alfuente, Andalucia, between the Taifa of Granada and the Taifa of Almeria, as described by the Jewish poet Samuel ibn Naghrela.
- Conrad II, Holy Roman Emperor ("the Elder") travels to Southern Italy and holds court in Troia. He orders Pandulf IV of Capua to restore the territories of Monte Cassino. Pandulf holes himself up in the fortress of Sant'Agata de' Goti, and dispatches tribute (300 lb of gold) and his son as hostage to Troia as a token of peace. Conrad accepts his offer, but the son escapes. Conrad goes on the offensive and seizes Capua, and gives it to Guaimar IV of Salerno.
- Duke John II drives his brother Manso II and his mother Maria out of Amalfi. He has Manso blinded and exiled to the island of Sirenuse. John reconciles with Maria, and allows her to remain as co-ruler of Amalfi.
- Duke Bretislav I of Bohemia invades Poland. He captures and destroys the cities of Gniezno and Poznań.
- The name of Versailles, at this time a small village, appears for the first time in a medieval charter in France.

====== Asia ======
- January 9 – An earthquake in Dingxiang, China kills an estimated 32,300.
- November 10 – Li Yuanhao proclaims himself Emperor of the Western Xia, declaring independence from the Song dynasty in China.

=== 1039 ===
==== By place ====
====== Europe ======
- June 4 – Conrad II, Holy Roman Emperor, ("the Elder") dies of gout in Utrecht after a 12-year reign. He is succeeded by his 21-year-old son, Henry III ("the Black"), who also becomes king of Italy and Burgundy.
- Duke Casimir I the Restorer returns to Poland, and makes great efforts to rebuild the war-ruined country. He establishes his residence at Kraków (which becomes Poland's capital until 1596).
- The Banu Tujib clan is deposed by Al-Mustain I, who starts the Banu Hud (Huddid dynasty), which rules over the Taifa of Zaragoza for almost a century.

==== By topic ====
====== Religion ======
- The Abbey of Bec is founded at Le Bec-Hellouin in Normandy (modern France).

== Significant people ==
- Al-Qadir caliph of Baghdad
- Abu Ja'far al-Qa'im caliph of Baghdad
- Al-Zahir li-i'zaz Din Allah caliph of Cairo
- Godwin, Earl of Wessex

== Births ==
1030

- July 21 – Kyansittha, king of the Pagan Empire (Burma)
- July 26 – Stanislaus of Szczepanów, bishop of Kraków (d. 1079)
- Adelaide of Eilenburg, German noblewoman (approximate date)
- Anne of Kiev, French queen and regent (approximate date)
- Baldwin VI (the Good), count of Flanders (approximate date)
- Bruno of Cologne, founder of the Carthusian Order (d. 1101)
- Gerard (the Great), duke of Lorraine (approximate date)
- Gertrude of Saxony, countess of Holland (approximate date)
- Manegold of Lautenbach, German priest (approximate date)
- Romanos IV, emperor of the Byzantine Empire (d. 1072)
- Vsevolod I Yaroslavich, Grand Prince of Kyiv (d. 1093)
- Walter of Pontoise, French abbot (approximate date)
- William of Hirsau, German abbot (approximate date)

1031

- March 26 – Malcolm III (Canmore), king of Scotland (d. 1093)
- Hoël II (or Houel), duke of Brittany (approximate date)
- Matilda of Flanders, queen consort of England (d. 1083)
- Muhammad ibn Ammar, Moorish poet and writer (d. 1086)
- Robert, Norman nobleman and Earl of Cornwall (d. 1095)
- Roger I (the Great Count), Norman nobleman (d. 1101)
- Shen Kuo, Chinese polymath scientist and engineer (d. 1095)
- Spytihněv II, duke of Bohemia (House of Přemyslid) (d. 1061)

1032

- February 16 – Ying Zong, Chinese emperor (d. 1067)
- September 3 – Go-Sanjō, Japanese emperor (d. 1073)
- September 14 – Dao Zong, Chinese emperor (d. 1101)
- Abe no Munetō, Japanese nobleman and samurai (d. 1108)
- Cheng Hao, Chinese neo-confucian philosopher (d. 1085)
- Donald III (the Fair), king of Scotland (approximate date)
- Ermengol III (or Armengol), count of Urgell (d. 1065)
- Gao, Chinese empress consort and regent (d. 1093)
- Gyrth Godwinson, English nobleman (approximated date)
- Hugh de Grandmesnil, Norman warrior and sheriff (d. 1098)
- Osbern FitzOsbern, bishop of Exeter (approximate date)
- Touzi Yiqing, Chinese Zen Buddhist monk (d. 1083)
- Vratislaus II (or Wratislaus), king of Bohemia (d. 1092)

1033

- Anselm, English archbishop and philosopher (d. 1109)
- Cheng Yi, Chinese neo-confucian philosopher (d. 1107)
- Conan II, duke of Brittany (approximate date)
- Fujiwara no Atsuie, Japanese nobleman (d. 1090)
- Fujiwara no Tadaie, Japanese statesman (d. 1091)
- Judith of Flanders, German duchess (approximate date)
- Theobald of Provins, French hermit and saint (d. 1066)
- Urraca of Zamora, Spanish noblewoman (d. 1101)

1034

- Joscelin I de Courtenay, French nobleman (House of Courtenay)
- Khön Könchok Gyalpo, founder of Sakya Monastery (d. 1102)

1035

- Dharma Pala, Indian ruler of the Pala dynasty (d. 1060)
- Richard fitz Gilbert, Norman nobleman (d. c.1090) (approximate date)
- Henry of Burgundy, French nobleman (approximate date)
- Hereward the Wake, English nobleman (approximate date)
- Hermann of Salm, German nobleman (approximate date)
- Isaac Albalia, Andalusian Jewish astronomer (d. 1094)
- Leofwine Godwinson, English nobleman (approximate date)
- Marbodius of Rennes, French archdeacon (approximate date)
- Nathan ben Jehiel, Italian Jewish lexicographer (d. 1106)
- Robert I, the Frisian, count of Flanders (approximate date)
- Urban II, pope of the Catholic Church (approximate date)

1036

- Anselm of Lucca (the Younger), Italian bishop (d. 1086)
- Fujiwara no Hiroko, Japanese empress (d. 1127)
- Igor Yaroslavich, prince of Smolensk (d. 1060)
- Wang Shen, Chinese painter and poet (d. 1093)

1037

- January 8 – Su Dongpo, Chinese calligrapher (d. 1101)
- Beatrice I, German abbess of Quedlinburg (d. 1061)
- Hawise, duchess of Brittany (approximate date)

1038

- Ibn Butlan, Arab Nestorian Christian physician (d. 1075)
- Isaac ibn Ghiyyat, Jewish rabbi and philosopher (d. 1089)
- Rostislav of Tmutarakan, Kievan Rus' prince (d. 1066)
- Sancho Garcés, Lord of Uncastillo, Spanish nobleman (approximate date)

1039

- Helibo, Chinese nobleman and chieftain (d. 1092)
- Minamoto no Yoshiie, Japanese samurai (d. 1106)
- Robert de Stafford, Norman nobleman (approximate date)
- Sancho IV, king of Pamplona (approximate date)
- Su Zhe, Chinese politician and historian (d. 1112)
- Vseslav of Polotsk, Kievan prince (approximate date)

== Deaths ==
1030

- January 10 – Thietmar, margrave of the Saxon Ostmark
- January 31 – William V (the Great), duke of Aquitaine (b. 969)
- March 10 – Welf II, German nobleman (Elder House of Welf)
- April 30 – Mahmud of Ghazni, Ghaznavid emir (b. 971)
- July 19 – Adalberon, French bishop and poet (or 1031)
- July 29
  - Bjørn Stallare, Norwegian servant and diplomat
  - Olaf II Haraldsson (St. Olaf), king of Norway
  - Torstein Knarresmed, Norwegian Viking warrior
- Al-Musabbihi, Fatimid historian and official (b. 977)
- Cú Mara mac Maic Liac, Irish poet and Chief Ollam
- Fan Kuan, Chinese landscape painter (approximate date)
- Gormflaith ingen Murchada, Irish queen (b. 960)
- Krešimir III, king of Croatia (Trpimirović Dynasty)
- Miskawayh, Persian official and philosopher (b. 932)
- Skapti Þóroddsson, Icelandic lawspeaker and skald
- Tadg in Eich Gil, king of Connacht (approximate date)
- William IV, count of Provence (approximate date)

1031

- January 1 – William of Volpiano, Italian abbot (b. 962)
- January 5 – Gunnor, duchess consort of Normandy
- April 10 – Liudolf of Lotharingia, German nobleman
- June 17 – Hyeonjong, king of Goryeo (Korea) (b. 992)
- June 25 – Sheng Zong, emperor of the Liao Dynasty (b. 972)
- June 28 – Taira no Tadatsune, Japanese governor (b. 975)
- July 20 – Robert II (the Pious), king of France (b. 972)
- August 20 – Burchard, French archbishop and count
- September 2 – Emeric, Hungarian prince and co-heir
- September 9 – Kang Kam-ch'an, Korean general (b. 948)
- November 29 – Al-Qadir, Abbasid caliph of Baghdad (b. 947)
- Aribo, German archbishop and primate (Primas Germaniae)
- Fadl ibn Muhammad, Shaddadid emir of Ganja (Azerbaijan)
- Qadi 'Abd al-Wahhab, Abbasid scholar and jurist (b. 973)
- Snorri Goði, Icelandic Viking warrior and chieftain (b. 963)

1032

- July 28 – Constance of Arles, French queen
- July 29 – Matilda of Swabia, German duchess
- September 6 – Rudolph III, king of Burgundy
- October 4 – Sancho VI, duke of Gascony
- Ahmad Maymandi, Ghaznavid vizier
- Arslan Yabgu, Turkic chieftain and ruler
- Bezprym (or Besfrim), duke of Poland
- Constantine Diogenes, Byzantine general
- Gille Coemgáin, king of Moray (Scotland)
- John XIX, pope of the Catholic Church
- Li, Chinese consort and concubine (b. 987)
- Li Deming, Chinese rebel leader (b. 981)
- Odo II, margrave of the Saxon Ostmark
- Otto Orseolo (or Ottone), doge of Venice

1033

- May 11 – Ebles I, French nobleman and archbishop
- Abu Talib Yahya, Muslim imam (Zaidiyyah sect) (b. 951)
- Ahmad Inaltigin, Ghaznavid general and rebel leader
- Ibno Al-Thahabi, Moorish encyclopedist and physician
- John VIII bar Abdoun, patriarch of Antioch (b. 944)
- Liu, empress and regent of the Song dynasty (b. 969)
- Merewith (or Beorhtwig), English abbot and bishop
- Otto Bolesławowic, Polish prince (House of Piast) (b. 1000)
- Rhydderch ap Iestyn, king of Gwent and Deheubarth

1034

- February 21 – Hawise of Normandy, French duchess and regent
- March 21 – Ezzo (or Ehrenfried), German count palatine
- April 11 – Romanos III (Argyros), Byzantine emperor (b. 968)
- October 31 – Deokjong, ruler of Goryeo (Korea) (b. 1016)
- November 9 – Oldřich (or Odalric), duke of Bohemia
- November 19 – Theodoric II, margrave of Lower Lusatia
- November 25 – Malcolm II, king of Alba (Scotland)
- December 8 – Æthelric (or Brihtmær), English bishop
- Adémar de Chabannes, French monk and historian
- Ali ibn Hasan (Ali-Tegin), Karakhanid ruler (khagan)
- Amlaíb mac Sitriuc, Norse-Gaelic king of Dublin
- Bernard Roger, French nobleman (approximate date)
- Manuchihr I, Persian ruler (shah) of Shirvan
- Matilda of Franconia, daughter of Conrad II
- Mieszko II (St. Lambert), king of Poland
- Qian Weiyan, Chinese politician and poet
- Salim ibn Mustafad, Mirdasid rebel leader
- Samuel ben Hofni, Jewish rabbi and writer

1035

- April 13 – Herbert I, French nobleman (approximate date)
- May 26 – Berenguer Ramon I, Spanish nobleman (b. 1005)
- May 30 – Baldwin IV ("the Bearded"), French nobleman (b. 980)
- July 3 – Robert I ("the Magnificent"), duke of Normandy (b. 1000) (approximate date)
- October 18 – Sancho III ("the Great"), king of Pamplona
- November 4 – Jaromír, duke of Bohemia (Přemyslid dynasty)
- November 12 – Cnut, king of Denmark, Norway and England
- Abu Ali ibn Muhammad, ruler (malik) of the Ghurid dynasty
- Astrid Olofsdotter, queen consort of Norway (House of Munsö)
- Drogo of Mantes, count of Valois and the Vexin (b. 996)
- Estrid of the Obotrites (or Astrid), queen consort of Sweden
- Guo, Chinese empress consort of Renzong (b. 1012)
- Harun, Ghaznavid governor and ruler (shah) of Khwarazm, assassinated
- Ibn al-Samh, Moorish astronomer and mathematician (b. 979)
- Svein Knutsson, king of Norway and son of Cnut the Great
- Yahya ibn Ali ibn Hammud al-Mu'tali, Hammudid caliph

1036

- February 5 – Alfred Aetheling, Anglo-Saxon prince
- March 17 – Gebhard II, bishop of Regensburg
- May 15 – Go-Ichijō, emperor of Japan (b. 1008)
- June 12 – Tedald (or Theobald), Italian bishop
- June 13 – al-Zahir li-i'zaz Din Allah, Fatimid caliph (b. 1005)
- August 25 – Pilgrim, archbishop of Cologne
- Abu Nasr Mansur, Persian mathematician (b. 960)
- Alric of Asti (or Adalric), Lombard bishop
- Berengar of Gascony, French nobleman
- Emilia of Gaeta, Italian duchess and regent
- Fujiwara no Ishi, Japanese empress (b. 999)
- Hárek of Tjøtta, Norwegian Viking chieftain
- Hisham III, Umayyad caliph of Córdoba (b. 973)

1037

- September 4 – Bermudo III (or Vermudo), king of León
- November 15 – Odo II, French nobleman (b. 983)
- Abu'l-Hasan Mihyar al-Daylami, Persian poet
- Abu Mansur al-Baghdadi, Persian Shafi'i scholar
- Baba Kuhi of Shiraz, Persian Sufi mystic (b. 948)
- Avicenna, Persian physician and polymath (b. 980)
- Boleslaus III (the Red), duke of Bohemia
- Ding Wei, grand chancellor of the Song Dynasty
- Farrukhi Sistani, Persian poet (or 1038)
- John of Debar, Bulgarian clergyman and bishop
- Muhammad al-Baghdadi, Persian mathematician
- Muirgeas ua Cú Ceanainn, king of Uí Díarmata
- Robert II, French prelate and archbishop
- Siegfried II, German nobleman (b. 956)
- William III (Taillefer), French nobleman

1038

- March – William VI, Duke of Aquitaine, French nobleman (b. 1004)
- March 28 – Hai Gaon, Jewish theologian (b. 939)
- April 23 – Liudolf of Brunswick, margrave of Frisia
- May 4 – Gotthard, bishop of Hildesheim (b. 960)
- May 22 – Shibl al-Dawla Nasr, Mirdasid emir of Aleppo
- July 6 – Ōnakatomi no Sukechika, Japanese poet (b. 954)
- July 18 – Gunhilda of Denmark, queen consort of Germany
- July – Herman IV, duke of Swabia (House of Babenberg)
- August 15 – Stephen I, king of Hungary
- November 1 – Herman I, Margrave of Meissen, German nobleman
- December 3 – Emma of Lesum, German noblewoman
- December 20 – Beorhtheah, bishop of Worcester
- Aethelnoth, archbishop of Canterbury
- Alice of Normandy, countess of Burgundy
- Al-Tha'alibi, Persian historian (b. 961)
- Budic of Nantes, French nobleman
- Ealdred, ealdorman of Bamburgh, murdered
- Ermengol II ("the Pilgrim"), count of Urgell
- Farrukhi Sistani, Persian poet (or 1037)
- Felix of Rhuys, Breton Benedictine abbot
- Habbus al-Muzaffar, Zirid ruler of Granada
- Kyiso, Burmese king of the Pagan Dynasty
- Ralph III of Valois (or Raoul), French nobleman

1039

- March 10 – Odo of Gascony (or Eudes), French nobleman
- April 16 – William III, count of Weimar and Eichsfeld
- May 27 – Dirk III (or Theodoric), count of Holland
- June 4 – Conrad II ("the Elder"), Holy Roman Emperor
- July 20 – Conrad II ("the Younger"), duke of Carinthia
- September 19 – Fujiwara no Genshi, empress of Japan (b. 1016)
- November 4 – Hugh of Chalon, French bishop
- November 29 – Adalbero, German nobleman
- Abu Nasr Mushkan, Persian statesman (or 1040)
- Iago ab Idwal ap Meurig, prince of Gwynedd
- Nathar Shah, Tamil mystic and preacher (b. 969)
- Regimbald, German abbot and bishop
- Reginar V (or Régnier), French nobleman
- Sophia I, German princess and abbess (b. 975)
- Unsuri, Persian poet and writer (or 1040)
