= Siege of Edessa (1036) =

- Part of Arab–Byzantine wars
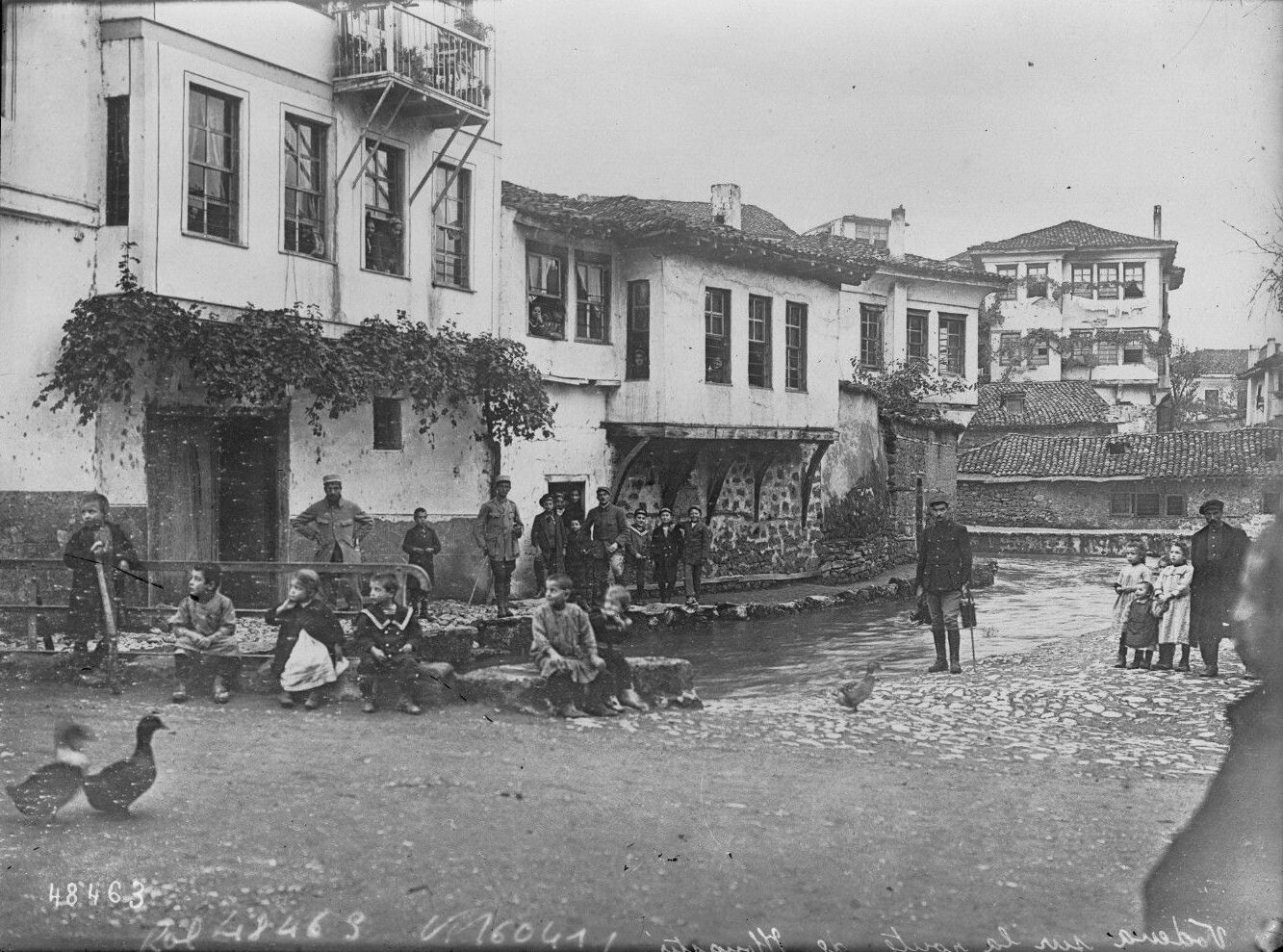
- Edessa sur la route de Monastir
Date	1036 April
Location	Edessa, Greater Syria
Result	Numayrid victory

Belligerents
Numayrid dynasty	Byzantine Empire

Commanders and leaders
Shabib ibn Waththab	Patrikios of Edessa (POW)

Casualties and losses
Unknown	Heavy

The Siege of Edessa in 1036 was a military conflict fought in the historic city of Edessa between a Muslim coalition led by the Numayrid dynasty and the Byzantine Empire.

== Background ==
After the Byzantines established control over Edessa, a powerful Muslim coalition formed in 1036 comprising the Numayrids, Marwanids, Mirdasids, and allied forces with the goal of recapturing the city from Byzantine hands.

== Siege ==
The coalition armies launched their assault on Edessa, successfully breaching the walls and pouring into the city. During the chaotic attack, the city was plundered a vast number of men, women, and livestock were captured, while many of the garrison and inhabitants were slain. Yet, though the Islamic forces secured total control over the city streets, their victory was incomplete. High above, fortified within the citadel, the Byzantine garrison held firm, refusing to be shaken or dislodged.

== Aftermath ==
As the walls of Edessa echoed with battle and the Muslim coalition tightened its grip on the citadel where the Byzantine garrison held out, urgent news reached the Numayrid emir, Shabib ibn Waththab, that his capital of Harran was under threat. Faced with this direct danger to his realm, the emir made a sudden retreat from Edessa to protect his home. The battle thus ended with a mixed outcome while the coalition captured the Byzantine commander of Edessa and plundered the city, the formidable citadel remained undefeated in Byzantine hands. Later, amid rising unrest and the growing Seljuk threat from the east, Shabib ibn Waththab turned to diplomacy, signing a peace treaty with the Byzantine Empire in 1037. Under the agreement, he conceded full control and the right to refortify Edessa to the Byzantines, keeping the city a firm imperial stronghold until it ultimately fell to the Seljuks in 1086.
