= 1037 =

Calendar year

1037 in various calendars
- Gregorian calendar: 1037; MXXXVII
- Ab urbe condita: 1790
- Armenian calendar: 486; ԹՎ ՆՁԶ
- Assyrian calendar: 5787
- Balinese saka calendar: 958–959
- Bengali calendar: 443–444
- Berber calendar: 1987
- English Regnal year: N/A
- Buddhist calendar: 1581
- Burmese calendar: 399
- Byzantine calendar: 6545–6546
- Chinese calendar: 丙子年 (Fire Rat); 3734 or 3527 — to — 丁丑年 (Fire Ox); 3735 or 3528
- Coptic calendar: 753–754
- Discordian calendar: 2203
- Ethiopian calendar: 1029–1030
- Hebrew calendar: 4797–4798
- Hindu calendars
- Vikram Samvat: 1093–1094
- Shaka Samvat: 958–959
- Kali Yuga: 4137–4138
- Holocene calendar: 11037
- Igbo calendar: 37–38
- Iranian calendar: 415–416
- Islamic calendar: 428–429
- Japanese calendar: Chōgen 10 / Chōryaku 1 (長暦元年)
- Javanese calendar: 940–941
- Julian calendar: 1037; MXXXVII
- Korean calendar: 3370
- Minguo calendar: 875 before ROC 民前875年
- Nanakshahi calendar: −431
- Seleucid era: 1348/1349 AG
- Thai solar calendar: 1579–1580
- Tibetan calendar: མེ་ཕོ་བྱི་བ་ལོ་ (male Fire-Rat); 1163 or 782 or 10 — to — མེ་མོ་གླང་ལོ་ (female Fire-Ox); 1164 or 783 or 11

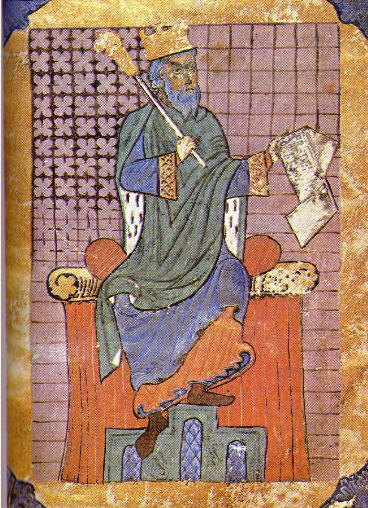
Ferdinand I (the Great) (c. 1015–1065)

Year 1037 (MXXXVII) was a common year starting on Saturday of the Julian calendar.

== Events ==
=== By place ===
==== Europe ====
- Spring – A revolt in northern Italy is started by Archbishop Aribert of Milan. King Henry III (eldest son of Emperor Conrad II) travels south of the Alps to quell it.
- February – At an Imperial Diet in Pavia (assembled by Conrad II), Aribert is accused of fomenting a revolt against the Holy Roman Empire, Conrad orders his arrest.
- May – Conrad II, with Pavian assistance, lays siege to Milan at the Porta Romana side, but the city holds out. In Rome, Pope Benedict IX deposes Aribert as archbishop.
- May 28 – Conrad II decrees the Constitutio de feudis which protects the rights of the valvassores (knights and burghers of the cities) in Lombardia (modern Italy).
- Summer – A Byzantine expeditionary force under George Maniakes lands at Sicily, and defeats the Zirids. Maniakes begins his campaign to reconquer the island.
- September 4 – Battle of Tamarón: Ferdinand I defeats and kills his brother-in-law Bermudo III. Ferdinand becomes the king of Castile and León (modern Spain).
- November 15 – Battle of Bar-le-Duc: Odo II, Count of Blois and Champagne, while invading the Duchy of Lorraine dies in battle with forces loyal to Gothelo I.

==== England ====
- King Harold I seizes the throne of England from his half-brother Harthacnut. His mother, Emma of Normandy, flees to Bruges in Flanders (modern Belgium).

==== Asia ====
- The Chinese rime dictionary of the Jiyun is published during the Song dynasty.
- The Great Seljuk Empire is established by Tugrul Bey.

== Births ==
- January 8 – Su Dongpo, Chinese calligrapher (d. 1101)
- Beatrice I, German abbess of Quedlinburg (d. 1061)
- Hawise, duchess of Brittany (approximate date)

== Deaths ==
- September 4 – Bermudo III (or Vermudo), king of León
- November 15 – Odo II, French nobleman (b. 983)
- Abu'l-Hasan Mihyar al-Daylami, Persian poet
- Abu Mansur al-Baghdadi, Persian Shafi'i scholar
- Baba Kuhi of Shiraz, Persian Sufi mystic (b. 948)
- Avicenna, Persian physician and polymath (b. 980)
- Boleslaus III (the Red), duke of Bohemia
- Ding Wei, grand chancellor of the Song dynasty
- Farrukhi Sistani, Persian poet (or 1038)
- John of Debar, Bulgarian clergyman and bishop
- Muhammad al-Baghdadi, Persian mathematician
- Muirgeas ua Cú Ceanainn, king of Uí Díarmata
- Robert II, French prelate and archbishop
- Siegfried II, German nobleman (b. 956)
- William III (Taillefer), French nobleman
