= 1050 =

1050 in various calendars
- Gregorian calendar: 1050; ML
- Ab urbe condita: 1803
- Armenian calendar: 499; ԹՎ ՆՂԹ
- Assyrian calendar: 5800
- Balinese saka calendar: 971–972
- Bengali calendar: 456–457
- Berber calendar: 2000
- English Regnal year: N/A
- Buddhist calendar: 1594
- Burmese calendar: 412
- Byzantine calendar: 6558–6559
- Chinese calendar: 己丑年 (Earth Ox); 3747 or 3540 — to — 庚寅年 (Metal Tiger); 3748 or 3541
- Coptic calendar: 766–767
- Discordian calendar: 2216
- Ethiopian calendar: 1042–1043
- Hebrew calendar: 4810–4811
- Hindu calendars
- Vikram Samvat: 1106–1107
- Shaka Samvat: 971–972
- Kali Yuga: 4150–4151
- Holocene calendar: 11050
- Igbo calendar: 50–51
- Iranian calendar: 428–429
- Islamic calendar: 441–442
- Japanese calendar: Eishō 5 (永承５年)
- Javanese calendar: 953–954
- Julian calendar: 1050; ML
- Korean calendar: 3383
- Minguo calendar: 862 before ROC 民前862年
- Nanakshahi calendar: −418
- Seleucid era: 1361/1362 AG
- Thai solar calendar: 1592–1593
- Tibetan calendar: ས་མོ་གླང་ལོ་ (female Earth-Ox); 1176 or 795 or 23 — to — ལྕགས་ཕོ་སྟག་ལོ་ (male Iron-Tiger); 1177 or 796 or 24

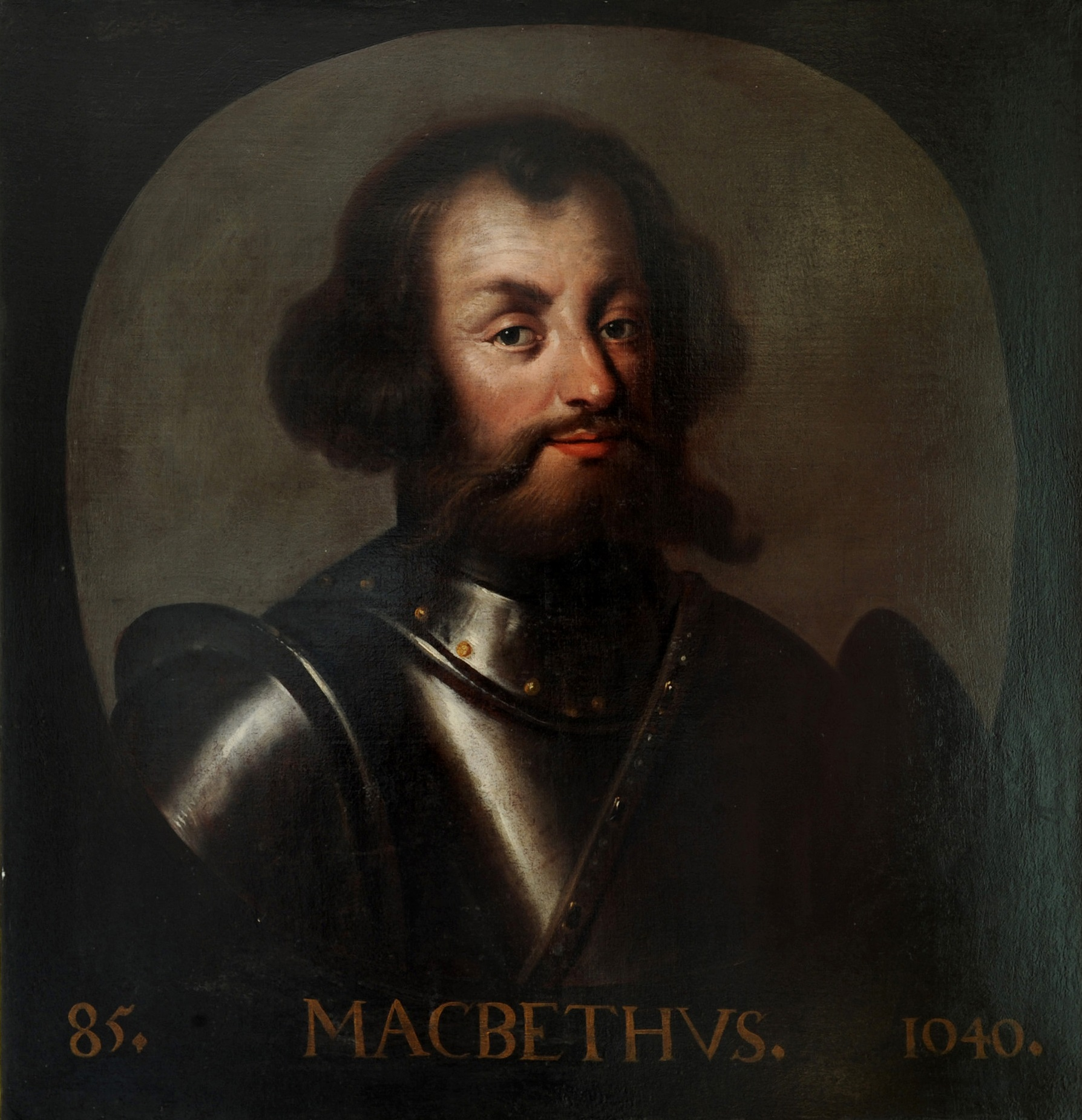
King Macbeth of Scotland (c. 1005–1057)

Year 1050 (ML) was a common year starting on Monday of the Julian calendar.

== Events ==
=== By place ===
==== Europe ====
- Hedeby in Jutland is sacked by King Harald Hardrada of Norway, during the course of a conflict with Sweyn II of Denmark.
- King Anund Jacob dies after a 28-year reign. He is succeeded by his elder half-brother Emund the Old as king of Sweden.
- Macbeth, King of Scotland, makes a pilgrimage to Rome.

==== Africa ====
- Aoudaghost, an important Berber trading center and rival of Koumbi Saleh, is captured by the Ghana Empire.

=== By topic ===
==== Religion ====
- King Edward the Confessor unites the English dioceses of Devon and Cornwall. He moves the see from Crediton to Exeter and gives the order to build a cathedral. Leofric becomes the first bishop of Exeter.
- The brewery of Weltenburg Abbey (modern Germany) is first mentioned, thus making it one of the oldest still operating breweries in the world (approximate date).

== Births ==
- November 11 – Henry IV, Holy Roman Emperor (d. 1106)
- Amadeus II, count of Savoy (approximate date)
- Berthold II, duke of Swabia (approximate date)
- Bertrand of Comminges, French bishop (d. 1126)
- Frederick I, duke of Swabia (approximate date)
- Leopold II ("the Fair"), margrave of Austria (d. 1095)
- Lhachen Gyalpo, king of Ladakh (approximate date)
- Liutold of Eppenstein, German nobleman (approximate date)
- Li Tang, Chinese landscape painter (approximate date)
- Lope Íñiguez, lord of Biscay (approximate date)
- Michael VII Doukas, Byzantine emperor (approximate date)
- Muhammad al-Baghdadi, Arab mathematician (d. 1141)
- Muirchertach Ua Briain, king of Munster (approximate date)
- Olaf I ("Hunger"), king of Denmark (approximate date)
- Olaf III ("the Peaceful"), king of Norway (approximate date)
- Osbern of Canterbury, English hagiographer (d. 1090)
- Peter the Hermit, French priest (approximate date)
- Sophia of Hungary, duchess of Saxony (approximate date)
- Sviatopolk II, Grand Prince of Kiev (d. 1113)
- Vidyakara, Indian Buddhist scholar (d. 1130)

== Deaths ==
- February 10 – Anna, Grand Princess of Kiev (b. 1001)
- October 29 – Eadsige, archbishop of Canterbury
- Alferius (or Alferio), Italian abbot and saint (b. 930)
- Anund Jacob (or James), king of Sweden (b. 1008)
- Casilda of Toledo, Spanish saint (approximate date)
- Constantine Arianites, Byzantine general
- Einar Thambarskelfir, Norwegian nobleman
- Herleva, Norman noblewoman (approximate date)
- Hugh of Langres, French bishop and theologian
- Humphrey de Vieilles, Norman nobleman
- Michael Dokeianos, Byzantine general
- Suryavarman I, king of the Khmer Empire
- Wifred II, count of Cerdanya and Berga
- Zoë, empress of the Byzantine Empire
