= 1036 =

Calendar year

1036 in various calendars
- Gregorian calendar: 1036; MXXXVI
- Ab urbe condita: 1789
- Armenian calendar: 485; ԹՎ ՆՁԵ
- Assyrian calendar: 5786
- Balinese saka calendar: 957–958
- Bengali calendar: 442–443
- Berber calendar: 1986
- English Regnal year: N/A
- Buddhist calendar: 1580
- Burmese calendar: 398
- Byzantine calendar: 6544–6545
- Chinese calendar: 乙亥年 (Wood Pig); 3733 or 3526 — to — 丙子年 (Fire Rat); 3734 or 3527
- Coptic calendar: 752–753
- Discordian calendar: 2202
- Ethiopian calendar: 1028–1029
- Hebrew calendar: 4796–4797
- Hindu calendars
- Vikram Samvat: 1092–1093
- Shaka Samvat: 957–958
- Kali Yuga: 4136–4137
- Holocene calendar: 11036
- Igbo calendar: 36–37
- Iranian calendar: 414–415
- Islamic calendar: 427–428
- Japanese calendar: Chōgen 9 (長元９年)
- Javanese calendar: 939–940
- Julian calendar: 1036; MXXXVI
- Korean calendar: 3369
- Minguo calendar: 876 before ROC 民前876年
- Nanakshahi calendar: −432
- Seleucid era: 1347/1348 AG
- Thai solar calendar: 1578–1579
- Tibetan calendar: ཤིང་མོ་ཕག་ལོ་ (female Wood-Boar); 1162 or 781 or 9 — to — མེ་ཕོ་བྱི་བ་ལོ་ (male Fire-Rat); 1163 or 782 or 10

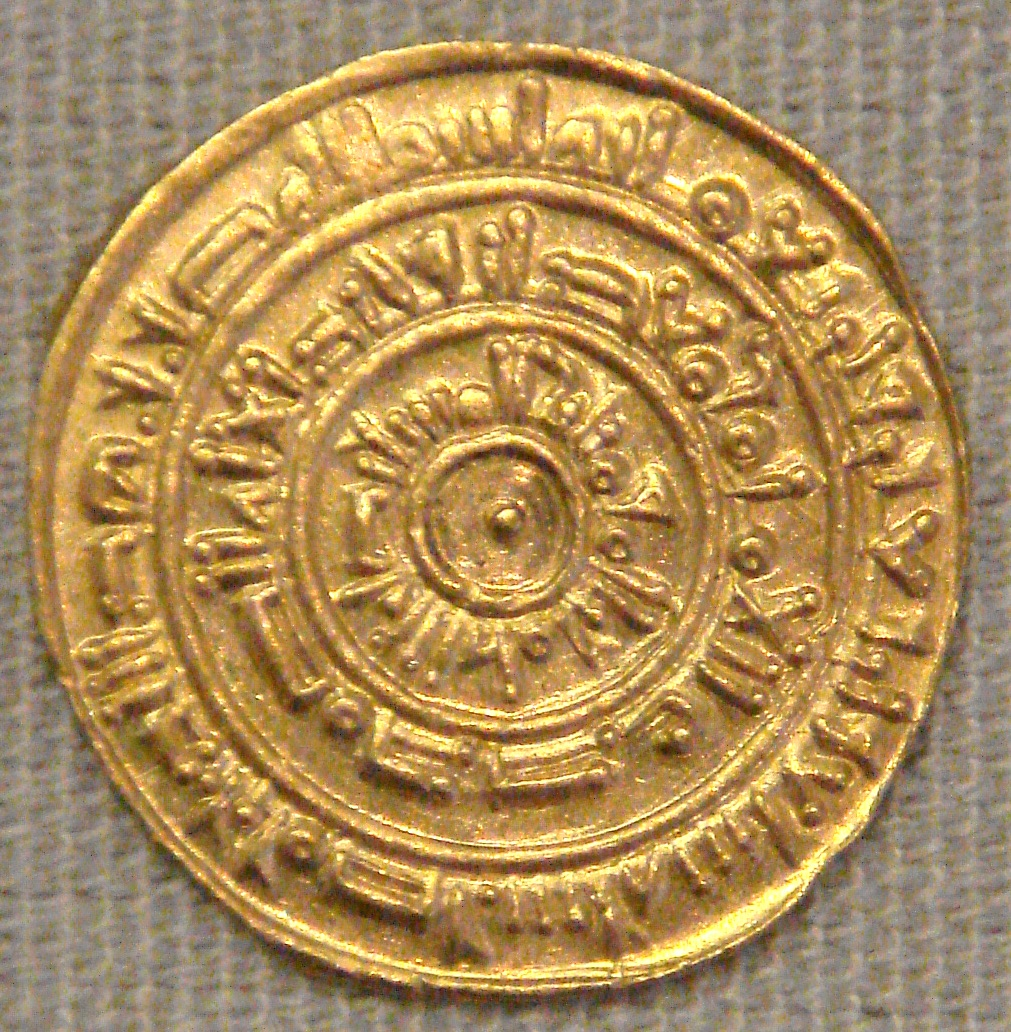
Gold coin of Al-Mustansir (r. 1036–1094)

Year 1036 (MXXXVI) was a leap year starting on Thursday of the Julian calendar.

== Events ==
=== By place ===
==== Europe ====
- Summer – In Naples, Duke Sergius IV abdicates and retires to a monastery; he is succeeded by his son John V.
- A Zirid expeditionary force invades Sicily and takes Palermo from the Normans, but fails to fully reconquer the island.

==== England ====
- February 5 – Edward the Confessor's younger brother Alfred Aetheling is blinded and murdered, in an apparent attempt to seize the throne of England from Harold I.

==== Africa ====
- June 13 – Caliph al-Zahir li-i'zaz Din Allah dies after a 16-year reign. He is succeeded by his 6-year-old son al-Mustansir as ruler of the Fatimid Caliphate. Vizier Ali ibn Ahmad al-Jarjara'i will guide the regency for the first few years.

==== China ====
- The Tangut script is devised by Yeli Renrong, for Emperor Jing Zong of Western Xia.

==== Japan ====
- May 15 – Emperor Go-Ichijō dies at the age of 27 after a 20-year reign. He is succeeded by his brother Go-Suzaku as the 69th emperor of Japan.

=== By topic ===
==== Religion ====
- Pope Benedict IX is briefly forced out of Rome, but returns with the help of the elder Conrad II, Holy Roman Emperor.
- The Flower Sermon first appears in Buddhist literature.

== Births ==
- Anselm of Lucca (the Younger), Italian bishop (d. 1086)
- Fujiwara no Hiroko, Japanese empress (d. 1127)
- Igor Yaroslavich, prince of Smolensk (d. 1060)
- Wang Shen, Chinese painter and poet (d. 1093)

== Deaths ==
- February 5 – Alfred Aetheling, Anglo-Saxon prince
- March 17 – Gebhard II, bishop of Regensburg
- May 15 – Go-Ichijō, emperor of Japan (b. 1008)
- June 12 – Tedald (or Theobald), Italian bishop
- June 13 – al-Zahir li-i'zaz Din Allah, Fatimid caliph (b. 1005)
- August 25 – Pilgrim, archbishop of Cologne
- Abu Nasr Mansur, Persian mathematician (b. 960)
- Alric of Asti (or Adalric), Lombard bishop
- Berengar of Gascony, French nobleman
- Emilia of Gaeta, Italian duchess and regent
- Fujiwara no Ishi, Japanese empress (b. 999)
- Hárek of Tjøtta, Norwegian Viking chieftain
- Hisham III, Umayyad caliph of Córdoba (b. 973)
