= 1033 =

Calendar year

1033 in various calendars
- Gregorian calendar: 1033; MXXXIII
- Ab urbe condita: 1786
- Armenian calendar: 482; ԹՎ ՆՁԲ
- Assyrian calendar: 5783
- Balinese saka calendar: 954–955
- Bengali calendar: 439–440
- Berber calendar: 1983
- English Regnal year: N/A
- Buddhist calendar: 1577
- Burmese calendar: 395
- Byzantine calendar: 6541–6542
- Chinese calendar: 壬申年 (Water Monkey); 3730 or 3523 — to — 癸酉年 (Water Rooster); 3731 or 3524
- Coptic calendar: 749–750
- Discordian calendar: 2199
- Ethiopian calendar: 1025–1026
- Hebrew calendar: 4793–4794
- Hindu calendars
- Vikram Samvat: 1089–1090
- Shaka Samvat: 954–955
- Kali Yuga: 4133–4134
- Holocene calendar: 11033
- Igbo calendar: 33–34
- Iranian calendar: 411–412
- Islamic calendar: 424–425
- Japanese calendar: Chōgen 6 (長元６年)
- Javanese calendar: 935–936
- Julian calendar: 1033; MXXXIII
- Korean calendar: 3366
- Minguo calendar: 879 before ROC 民前879年
- Nanakshahi calendar: −435
- Seleucid era: 1344/1345 AG
- Thai solar calendar: 1575–1576
- Tibetan calendar: ཆུ་ཕོ་སྤྲེ་ལོ་ (male Water-Monkey); 1159 or 778 or 6 — to — ཆུ་མོ་བྱ་ལོ་ (female Water-Bird); 1160 or 779 or 7

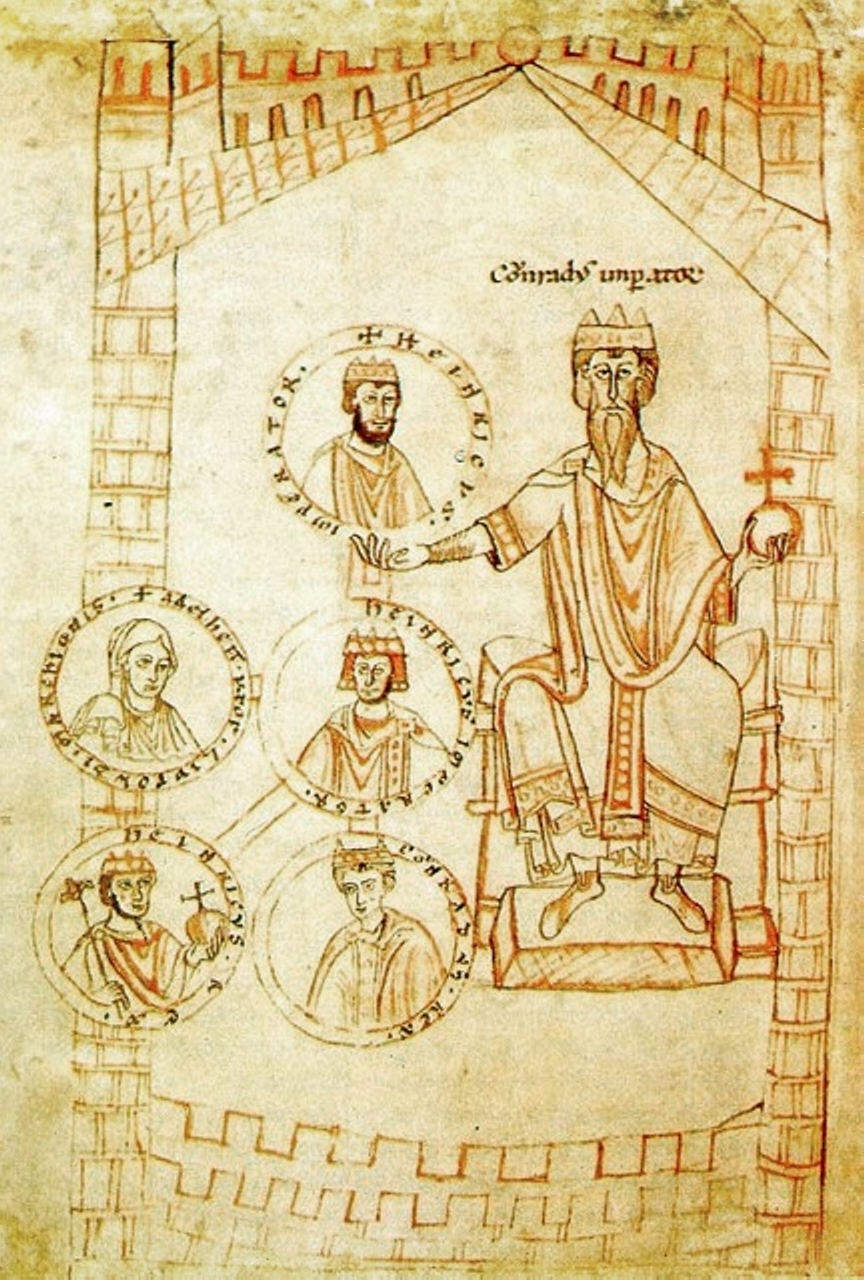
Emperor Conrad II (right) on his throne.

Year 1033 (MXXXIII) was a common year starting on Monday (the wikilink will display the full calendar) of the Julian calendar.

== Events ==
=== By place ===
==== Asia ====
- December 5 – A major earthquake in the Jordan Valley devastates multiple cities across the Palestine region, killing many people and triggering a tsunami.

==== Europe ====
- February 2 – Emperor Conrad II (the Elder) holds an assembly at the Abbey of Payerne and is crowned King of Burgundy. He claims dominion over the Kingdom of Burgundy which is incorporated into the Holy Roman Empire.
- Treaty of Merseburg: Conrad II attends a Hoftag at Merseburg and signs an agreement with King Mieszko II. He divides Poland in three parts with Mieszko designated as supreme ruler, in exchange for Conrad's support.

=== By topic ===
==== Religion ====
- Panic spreads throughout Europe that the end of the universe may be near, on the 1,000th anniversary of the crucifixion of Christ, due to some unusually harsh spring weather. One interpretation of the Book of Revelation (Chapter 20) predicts the end of the earth following a 1,000 year period after the second return of Jesus Christ rather than before.

== Births ==
- Anselm, English archbishop and philosopher (d. 1109)
- Cheng Yi, Chinese neo-confucian philosopher (d. 1107)
- Conan II, duke of Brittany (approximate date)
- Fujiwara no Atsuie, Japanese nobleman (d. 1090)
- Fujiwara no Tadaie, Japanese statesman (d. 1091)
- Judith of Flanders, German duchess (approximate date)
- Theobald of Provins, French hermit and saint (d. 1066)
- Urraca of Zamora, Spanish noblewoman (d. 1101)

== Deaths ==
- May 11 – Ebles I, French nobleman and archbishop
- Abu Talib Yahya, Muslim imam (Zaidiyyah sect) (b. 951)
- Ahmad Inaltigin, Ghaznavid general and rebel leader
- Ibno Al-Thahabi, Moorish encyclopedist and physician
- John VIII bar Abdoun, patriarch of Antioch (b. 944)
- Liu, empress and regent of the Song dynasty (b. 969)
- Merewith (or Beorhtwig), English abbot and bishop
- Otto Bolesławowic, Polish prince (House of Piast) (b. 1000)
- Rhydderch ap Iestyn, king of Gwent and Deheubarth
