= 1009 =

Calendar year

1009 in various calendars
- Gregorian calendar: 1009; MIX
- Ab urbe condita: 1762
- Armenian calendar: 458; ԹՎ ՆԾԸ
- Assyrian calendar: 5759
- Balinese saka calendar: 930–931
- Bengali calendar: 415–416
- Berber calendar: 1959
- English Regnal year: N/A
- Buddhist calendar: 1553
- Burmese calendar: 371
- Byzantine calendar: 6517–6518
- Chinese calendar: 戊申年 (Earth Monkey); 3706 or 3499 — to — 己酉年 (Earth Rooster); 3707 or 3500
- Coptic calendar: 725–726
- Discordian calendar: 2175
- Ethiopian calendar: 1001–1002
- Hebrew calendar: 4769–4770
- Hindu calendars
- Vikram Samvat: 1065–1066
- Shaka Samvat: 930–931
- Kali Yuga: 4109–4110
- Holocene calendar: 11009
- Igbo calendar: 9–10
- Iranian calendar: 387–388
- Islamic calendar: 399–400
- Japanese calendar: Kankō 6 (寛弘６年)
- Javanese calendar: 911–912
- Julian calendar: 1009; MIX
- Korean calendar: 3342
- Minguo calendar: 903 before ROC 民前903年
- Nanakshahi calendar: −459
- Seleucid era: 1320/1321 AG
- Thai solar calendar: 1551–1552
- Tibetan calendar: ས་ཕོ་སྤྲེ་ལོ་ (male Earth-Monkey); 1135 or 754 or −18 — to — ས་མོ་བྱ་ལོ་ (female Earth-Bird); 1136 or 755 or −17

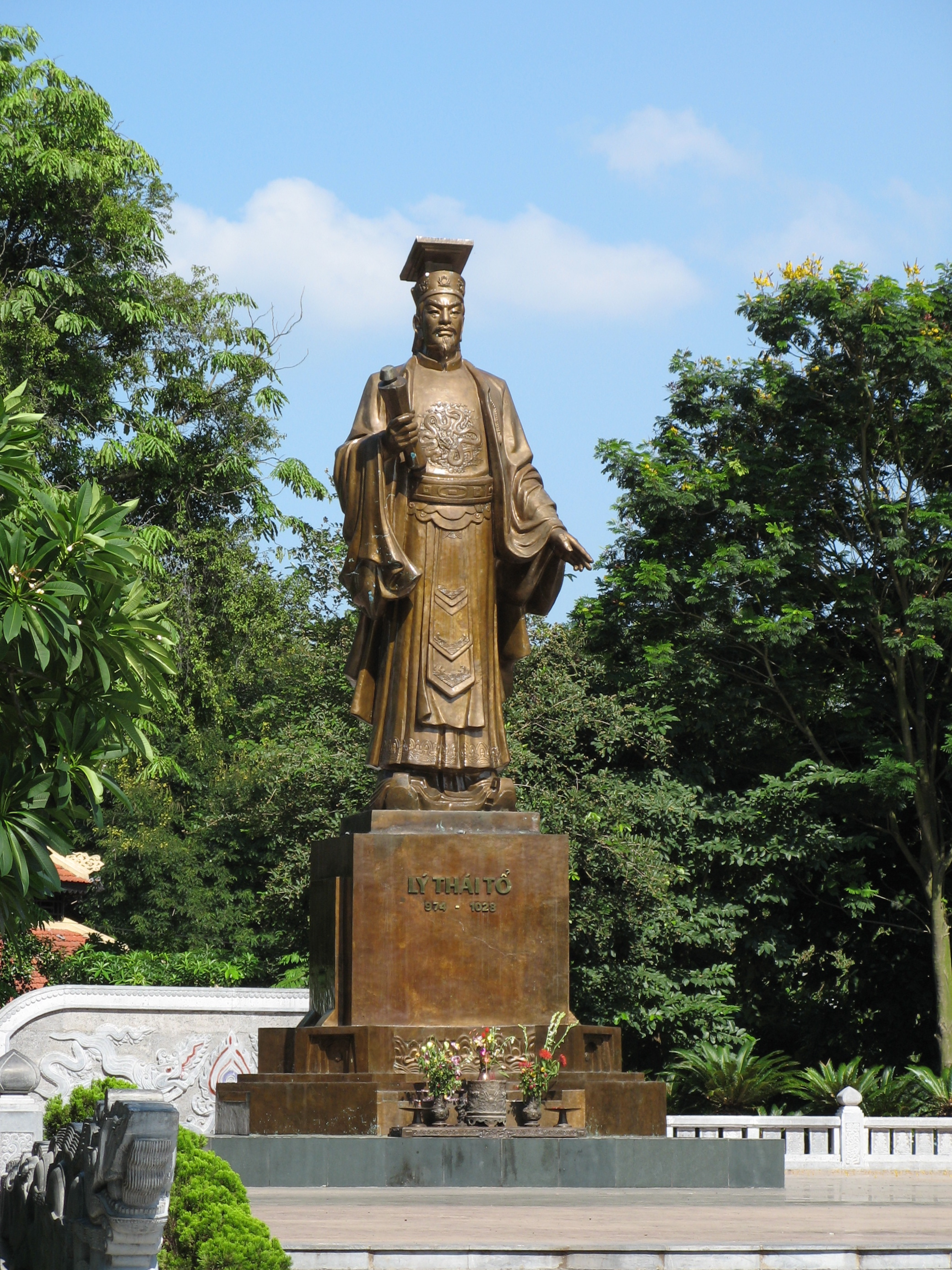
Emperor Lý Thái Tổ (r. 1009 –1028)

Year 1009 (MIX) was a common year starting on Saturday of the Julian calendar. It was the 1009th year of the Common Era (CE) and Anno Domini (AD) designations, the 9th year of the 2nd millennium, the 9th year of the 11th century, and the 10th and last year of the 1000s decade.

== Events ==
=== By place ===
==== Europe ====
- February 14 or March 9 – The first known mention is made of the name of Lithuania, in connection with the murder of Bruno of Querfurt. He is beheaded and his 18 companions are hanged the same day during a mission among the Prussians in the Baltic region.
- May 9 – Lombard Revolt: Lombard forces led by Melus, an Italian nobleman, revolt in Bari against the Catepanate of Italy (a province of the Byzantine Empire). He and his brother-in-law Dattus (or Datto) mobilise a large army and invade southern Italy.
- November 5 – Berber forces led by Sulayman ibn al-Hakam defeat the Umayyad caliph Muhammad II in the Battle of Qantish. He enters the city of Córdoba, which is sacked by Berbers and Castillans. Sulayman is elected as caliph of the Caliphate of Córdoba.
- Doge Pietro II Orseolo dies after an 18-year reign in which he has started the expansion of Venetia by conquering the islands of Lastovo and Korčula along the Dalmatian coast. Pietro is succeeded by his 16-year-old son Otto Orseolo as sole ruler of Venice.
- Law on planning and building passed in Serbia during the reign of Prince Jovan Vladimir.

==== England ====
- Danish Viking raiders led by Sweyn Forkbeard repeatedly attack southern England, destroying the land to avenge the St. Brice's Day massacre of 1002.
- August – A large Viking army led by Thorkell the Tall lands on Kent and proceeds to terrorize most of Southern England.

==== Asia ====
- Spring – General Kang Cho leads a coup against King Mokjong. He is deposed and sent into exile in Chungju. After murdering Mokjong, Kang Cho places Hyeonjong on the throne as ruler of Goryeo.
- November 19 – The end of the Anterior Lê dynasty was followed by the death of emperor Lê Long Đĩnh.
- November 21 – The Lý dynasty in Vietnam is proclaimed by Emperor Lý Thái Tổ (former commander of the palace guard) after the death of Lê Long Đĩnh, the last monarch of the Lê Dynasty.

==== Japan ====
- Princess Takahime (daughter of Imperial Prince Tomohira, cousin of emperor Ichijo) is married to Fujiwara no Yorimichi, first son of Fujiwara no Michinaga, enlarging the latter’s power.
- Takashina no Mitsuko is imprisoned for cursing the empress; Fujiwara no Korechika is also implicated but later pardoned.
- Murasaki Shikibu teaches the Chinese written language to Empress Shoshi in secret because this is usually a male accomplishment.

=== By topic ===
==== Religion ====
- Summer – Pope John XVIII dies after a pontificate of 5 years. He is succeeded by Sergius IV as the 142nd pope of the Catholic Church.
- August 29 – Mainz Cathedral suffers extensive damage from a fire, which destroys the building on the day of its inauguration.
- October 18 – The Church of the Holy Sepulchre in Jerusalem is destroyed by the Fatimid caliph Al-Hakim bi-Amr Allah.

== Births ==
- May 22 – Su Xun, Chinese writer (d. 1066)
- December 14 – Atsunaga, future Emperor Go-Suzaku of Japan (d. 1045)
- Adèle of France, countess of Flanders (d. 1079)
- Ali Hariri, Marwanid poet and philosopher (d. 1079)
- George the Hagiorite, Georgian calligrapher (d. 1065)
- Qatran Tabrizi, Persian poet and writer (d. 1072)
- Toirdelbach Ua Briain, king of Munster (d. 1086)
- Yusuf ibn Tashfin, sultan of Morocco (d. 1106)

== Deaths ==
- February 14 – Bruno of Querfurt, German missionary bishop
- March 2 – Mokjong, king of Goryeo (Korea) (b. 980)
- March 3 – Abd al-Rahman Sanchuelo, Umayyad chief minister (b. 983)
- June or July – John XVIII, pope of the Catholic Church
- August 21 – Tomohira, Japanese imperial prince (uncle of the emperor)
- November 13 – Dedo I, German nobleman (b. 950)
- November 19 – Lê Long Đĩnh, emperor of the Lê Dynasty (b. 986)
- December 25 – Bernard William, French nobleman
- Abu al-Hasan Ali, Ma'munid ruler of Khwarezm (Iran)
- Abu Muhammad Lu'lu' al-Kabir, emir of Aleppo (Syria)
- Fujiwara no Nagatō, Japanese bureaucrat and poet (b. 949)
- Ibn Yunus, Fatimid astronomer and mathematician
- Khalaf ibn Ahmad, emir of the Saffarid dynasty (b. 937)
- Pietro II Orseolo, doge of Venice (b. 961)
- Xiao Yanyan, Chinese Khitan empress (b. 953)
