= 1090 =

1090 in various calendars
- Gregorian calendar: 1090; MXC
- Ab urbe condita: 1843
- Armenian calendar: 539; ԹՎ ՇԼԹ
- Assyrian calendar: 5840
- Balinese saka calendar: 1011–1012
- Bengali calendar: 496–497
- Berber calendar: 2040
- English Regnal year: 3 Will. 2 – 4 Will. 2
- Buddhist calendar: 1634
- Burmese calendar: 452
- Byzantine calendar: 6598–6599
- Chinese calendar: 己巳年 (Earth Snake); 3787 or 3580 — to — 庚午年 (Metal Horse); 3788 or 3581
- Coptic calendar: 806–807
- Discordian calendar: 2256
- Ethiopian calendar: 1082–1083
- Hebrew calendar: 4850–4851
- Hindu calendars
- Vikram Samvat: 1146–1147
- Shaka Samvat: 1011–1012
- Kali Yuga: 4190–4191
- Holocene calendar: 11090
- Igbo calendar: 90–91
- Iranian calendar: 468–469
- Islamic calendar: 482–483
- Japanese calendar: Kanji 4 (寛治４年)
- Javanese calendar: 994–995
- Julian calendar: 1090; MXC
- Korean calendar: 3423
- Minguo calendar: 822 before ROC 民前822年
- Nanakshahi calendar: −378
- Seleucid era: 1401/1402 AG
- Thai solar calendar: 1632–1633
- Tibetan calendar: ས་མོ་སྦྲུལ་ལོ་ (female Earth-Snake); 1216 or 835 or 63 — to — ལྕགས་ཕོ་རྟ་ལོ་ (male Iron-Horse); 1217 or 836 or 64

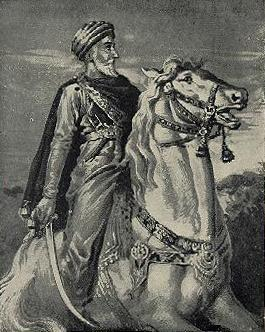
Hassan-i Sabbah (c. 1050–1124)

Year 1090 (MXC) was a common year starting on Tuesday of the Julian calendar.

== Events ==
=== By place ===
==== Europe ====
- A third Almoravid expedition is launched in Al-Andalus, designed to finally subdue the Taifa's Kingdoms. The cities of Córdoba, Seville, Granada, Málaga, Almería and Ronda fall to the troops of Sultan Yusuf ibn Tashfin.
- King Stephen II of Croatia becomes involved in an open conflict between factions of the Croatian nobility, who reassert their traditional rights in their own counties.
- November 3 – King William Rufus of England tries to take advantage of the unrest in Normandy and take it from his brother Robert Curthose. Though he wins over several Norman nobles to his side, his plot to capture the capital city of Rouen fails.

==== Middle East ====
- Hassan-i Sabbah founds the Nizari Ismaili state after taking control of the Alamut Castle and organising the military group called the Order of Assassins.

==== Africa ====
- Béjaïa (or Bugia) becomes the capital of the Hammadid dynasty in modern-day Algeria. It becomes an important port and centre of culture.

=== By topic ===
==== Arts and Culture ====
- Troubadours begin playing in western Aquitaine (Poitou and Saintonge) and Gascony (approximate date).

==== Science and Technology ====
- Qin Guan, Chinese poet of the Song dynasty, writes the Can Shu (Book of Sericulture), which describes a silk-reeling machine that has the world's oldest known mechanical belt drive.

== Births ==
- January 17 – Qin Hui, Chinese chancellor (d. 1155)
- unknown dates
  - Frederick II ("the One-Eyed"), German nobleman (d. 1147)
  - Dōin (Fujiwara no Atsuyori), Japanese waka poet (d. 1179)
- probable
  - Adolf III, German count of Berg and Hövel (d. 1152)
  - Agnes I, German abbess of Quedlinburg (approximate date)
  - Alaungsithu, Burmese king of the Pagan dynasty (d. 1167)
  - Arnold of Brescia, Italian canon regular (approximate date)
  - Bernard of Clairvaux, French abbot and theologian (d. 1153)
  - Chen Yuyi, Chinese politician of the Song dynasty (d. 1138)
  - Eliezer ben Nathan, German rabbi and liturgical poet (d. 1170)
  - Eric II ("the Memorable"), king of Denmark (approximate date)
  - Fujiwara no Akisuke, Japanese nobleman and poet (d. 1155)
  - Juliane de Fontevrault, illegitimate daughter of King Henry I of England
  - Conrad I, Duke of Zähringen, German nobleman and rector of Burgundy (d. 1152)
  - Niklot (or Nyklot), Obotrite prince and tribal chief (d. 1160)
  - Robert, 1st Earl of Gloucester, illegitimate son of King Henry I of England
  - Theobald II of Champagne ("the Great"), French nobleman
  - Theobald of Bec, Norman churchman, archbishop of Canterbury
  - William de Mohun, 1st Earl of Somerset, Anglo-Norman nobleman

== Deaths ==
- March 22 – García II, king of Galicia and Portugal (b. 1042)
- April 16 – Sikelgaita, Lombard duchess of Apulia (b. 1040)
- May 3 – Adelaide of Rheinfelden, queen consort of Hungary
- May 12 – Liutold of Eppenstein, German nobleman
- May 18 – Berthold of Rheinfelden, German nobleman
- June 26 – Jaromír, Bohemian prince and bishop
- July 3 – Egbert II (or Ekbert), German nobleman
- August 11 – Fujiwara no Atsuie, Japanese nobleman (b. 1033)
- August 13 – Constance of Normandy, duchess of Brittany
- unknown dates
  - Abd al-Jalil ibn Wahbun, Moorish poet and writer
  - Fayun Faxiu, Chinese Chan Buddhist monk (b. 1027)
  - Richard fitz Gilbert, Norman nobleman (b. c.10350
  - Guo Xi, Chinese landscape painter
  - St Isaiah of Rostov, Kievan missionary and bishop
  - Raynald I, French Benedictine abbot (b. 1059)
  - William of Poitiers, French priest and chronicler (b. c.1020)
- probable
  - Osbern of Canterbury, English hagiographer
