= 948 =

Calendar year

948 in various calendars
| Gregorian calendar | 948; CMXLVIII |
| Ab urbe condita | 1701 |
| Armenian calendar | 397; ԹՎ ՅՂԷ |
| Assyrian calendar | 5698 |
| Balinese saka calendar | 869–870 |
| Bengali calendar | 354–355 |
| Berber calendar | 1898 |
| Buddhist calendar | 1492 |
| Burmese calendar | 310 |
| Byzantine calendar | 6456–6457 |
| Chinese calendar | 丁未年 (Fire Goat); 3645 or 3438 — to — 戊申年 (Earth Monkey); 3646 or 3439 |
| Coptic calendar | 664–665 |
| Discordian calendar | 2114 |
| Ethiopian calendar | 940–941 |
| Hebrew calendar | 4708–4709 |
- Hindu calendars
| Vikram Samvat | 1004–1005 |
| Shaka Samvat | 869–870 |
| Kali Yuga | 4048–4049 |
| Holocene calendar | 10948 |
| Iranian calendar | 326–327 |
| Islamic calendar | 336–337 |
| Japanese calendar | Tenryaku 2 (天暦２年) |
| Javanese calendar | 848–849 |
| Julian calendar | 948; CMXLVIII |
| Korean calendar | 3281 |
| Minguo calendar | 964 before ROC 民前964年 |
| Nanakshahi calendar | −520 |
| Seleucid era | 1259/1260 AG |
| Thai solar calendar | 1490–1491 |
| Tibetan calendar | མེ་མོ་ལུག་ལོ་ (female Fire-Sheep); 1074 or 693 or −79 — to — ས་ཕོ་སྤྲེ་ལོ་ (male Earth-Monkey); 1075 or 694 or −78 |

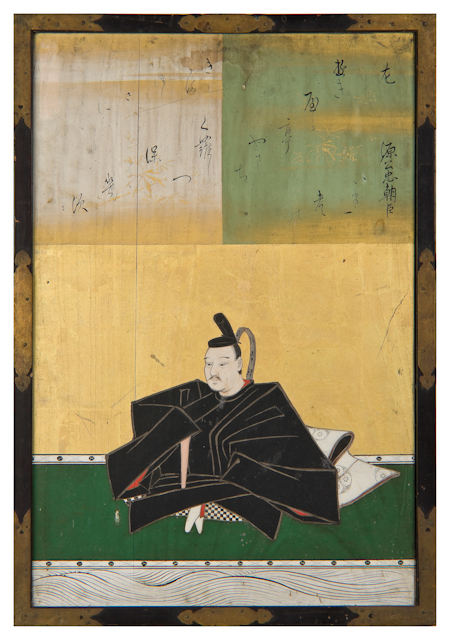
Minamoto no Kintada (889–948)

Year 948 (CMXLVIII) was a leap year starting on Saturday of the Julian calendar.

== Events ==
=== By place ===
==== Byzantine Empire ====
- Arab–Byzantine War: Hamdanid forces under Sayf al-Dawla raid into Asia Minor. The Byzantines respond with reprisals led by Leo Phokas the Younger, taking captives and razing the walls of Hadath (modern Turkey).

==== Europe ====
- Two Hungarian armies invade Bavaria and Carinthia. One of them is defeated at Flozzun in the Nordgau by Henry I, duke of Bavaria.
- King Otto I appoints his son Liudolf as duke of Swabia, consolidating Ottonian dominance in Southern Germany.
- Sunifred II of Urgell dies without descendants and is succeeded by his nephew Borrell II, count of Barcelona.

==== England ====
- King Eadred ravages Northumbria and burns down St. Wilfrid's church at Ripon. On his way home, he sustains heavy losses at Castleford. Eadred manages to check his rivals, and the Northumbrians are forced to pay him compensation.
- St. Albans School is founded in Hertfordshire.

==== Africa ====
- Spring – Fatimid forces under al-Hasan ibn Ali al-Kalbi suppress the rebellion in Palermo and swiftly seize the island. Caliph al-Mansur bi-Nasr Allah appoints Ali al-Kalbi as emir of Sicily, beginning the rule of the Kalbid dynasty.
- The Kingdom of Nri (modern Nigeria) is founded by the priest-king Eri (until 1041).

==== China ====
- February 12 – King Qian Hongzong is deposed by general Hu Jinsi during a coup. He establishes his younger brother Qian Chu as ruler of Wuyue.

=== By topic ===
==== Literature ====
- Minamoto no Kintada, a Japanese official and waka poet, dies. He is a respected nobleman at the imperial court and a member of the Thirty-Six Immortals of Poetry.

==== Religion ====
- Otto I establishes the missionary dioceses of Brandenburg and Havelberg in the territory of the Marca Geronis (Saxon Eastern March).
- The Nallur Kandaswamy temple, one of the most significant Hindu temples in the Jaffna District (modern Sri Lanka), is built.
- St Albans School in Hertfordshire is founded by Wulsin, an abbot of St Alban's Abbey, England.

== Births ==
- September 1 – Jing Zong, emperor of the Liao Dynasty (d. 982)
- December 22 – Kang Kam-ch'an, Korean official and general (d. 1031)
- Al-Shaykh Al-Mufid, Twelver Shia theologian (approximate date)
- Baba Kuhi of Shiraz, Persian Sufi mystic and writer (d. 1037)
- Emma of Italy, queen of the West Frankish Kingdom (approximate date)
- Minamoto no Yorimitsu, Japanese nobleman (d. 1021)

== Deaths ==
- June 15 – Romanos I, Byzantine emperor (b. c. 870)
- March 10 – Liu Zhiyuan, founder of the Later Han (b. 895)
- March 13 – Du Chongwei, Chinese general and governor
- April 28 – Hu Jinsi, Chinese general and prefect
- August 24 – Zhang Ye, Chinese general and chancellor
- November 10 – Zhao Yanshou, Chinese general and governor
- December 1 – Gao Conghui, prince and ruler of Jingnan (b. 891)
- December 12 – Li Song, Chinese official and chancellor
- Al-Qasim Guennoun, Idrisid ruler and sultan
- Blácaire mac Gofraid, Viking king of Dublin
- Gormflaith ingen Flann Sinna, Irish queen
- Ibrahim ibn Simjur, Samanid governor
- Minamoto no Kintada, Japanese waka poet (b. 889)
- Sunifred II, count of Urgell (Spain) (b. c. 870)
