= 980 =

980 in various calendars
- Gregorian calendar: 980; CMLXXX
- Ab urbe condita: 1733
- Armenian calendar: 429; ԹՎ ՆԻԹ
- Assyrian calendar: 5730
- Balinese saka calendar: 901–902
- Bengali calendar: 386–387
- Berber calendar: 1930
- Buddhist calendar: 1524
- Burmese calendar: 342
- Byzantine calendar: 6488–6489
- Chinese calendar: 己卯年 (Earth Rabbit); 3677 or 3470 — to — 庚辰年 (Metal Dragon); 3678 or 3471
- Coptic calendar: 696–697
- Discordian calendar: 2146
- Ethiopian calendar: 972–973
- Hebrew calendar: 4740–4741
- Hindu calendars
- Vikram Samvat: 1036–1037
- Shaka Samvat: 901–902
- Kali Yuga: 4080–4081
- Holocene calendar: 10980
- Iranian calendar: 358–359
- Islamic calendar: 369–370
- Japanese calendar: Tengen 3 (天元３年)
- Javanese calendar: 881–882
- Julian calendar: 980; CMLXXX
- Korean calendar: 3313
- Minguo calendar: 932 before ROC 民前932年
- Nanakshahi calendar: −488
- Seleucid era: 1291/1292 AG
- Thai solar calendar: 1522–1523
- Tibetan calendar: ས་མོ་ཡོས་ལོ་ (female Earth-Hare); 1106 or 725 or −47 — to — ལྕགས་ཕོ་འབྲུག་ལོ་ (male Iron-Dragon); 1107 or 726 or −46

Year 980 (CMLXXX) was a leap year starting on Thursday of the Julian calendar.

== Events ==
=== By place ===
==== Europe ====
- Peace is concluded between Emperor Otto II (the Red) and King Lothair III (or Lothair IV) at Margut, ending the Franco-German war of 978–980. Lothair renounces his claim on Lower Lorraine, while Otto promises to recognize Lothair's son Louis V as the rightful heir of the West Frankish Kingdom.
- June 11 – Vladimir I (the Great), grand prince of Kiev, consolidates the Kievan realm from modern Ukraine to the Baltic Sea. Vladimir is proclaimed ruler (knyaz) of all Kievan Rus'.
- Fall – Otto II sets off on his first expedition to Italy. He leaves the government in the hands of Archchancellor Willigis. Otto is accompanied by his wife, Empress Theophanu.
- Winter – Otto II celebrates Christmas with his family at Ravenna. He receives the Iron Crown of Lombardy as the King of Italy.
- King Harald Bluetooth orders the construction of the Viking ring fortress of Trelleborg (modern Denmark).

==== England ====
- Viking raids from Scandinavia threaten the southern English coast after a pause of 25 years. Hampshire and the Isle of Thanet are ravaged.

==== Arabian Empire ====
- The Dari dialect (which will become the major language of Persia) is developed in the royal courts of the Samanid Empire in Central Asia.

==== Africa ====
- The Kilwa Sultanate, centered at Kilwa (an island off modern Tanzania), is founded by Ali ibn al-Hassan Shirazi, Persian prince of Shiraz.

=== By topic ===
==== Religion ====
- Notker (or Notger), Frankish Benedictine monk and bishop, founds the Prince-Bishopric of Liège (modern Belgium) which will remain an independent state inside the Holy Roman Empire for more than 800 years.

== Births ==
- July 5 – Mokjong, king of Goryeo (Korea) (d. 1009)
- July 15 – Ichijō, emperor of Japan (d. 1011)
- Abu Mansur al-Baghdadi, Persian scholar (d. 1037)
- Abu 'Ubayd al-Juzjani, Persian physician (d. 1070)
- Adalbero, German nobleman (approximate date)
- Avicenna, Persian polymath (approximate date)
- Baldwin IV of Flanders (the Bearded), French nobleman (d. 1035)
- Bardo, German abbot and archbishop (approximate date)
- Benedict VIII, pope of the Catholic Church (d. 1024)
- Einar Thambarskelfir, Norwegian nobleman (d. 1050)
- Ekkehard IV, Swiss chronicler (approximate date)
- Farrukhi Sistani, Persian poet (approximate date)
- Geoffrey I, French nobleman (d. 1008)
- Herman I, German nobleman (approximate date)
- Humbert I, founder of the House of Savoy (approximate date)
- Pope Nicholas II, pope of the Catholic Church (d. 1061)
- Olof Skötkonung, king of Sweden (approximate date)
- Otto III, Holy Roman Emperor (d. 1002)
- Sviatopolk I, Grand Prince of Kiev (approximate date)
- Tancred of Hauteville, Norman nobleman (d. 1041)
- Theodora Porphyrogenita, Byzantine empress (d. 1056)
- Xuedou Chongxian, Chinese Buddhist monk (d. 1052)

== Deaths ==
- February 15 – Berthold, German nobleman (approximate date)
- September 28 – Minamoto no Hiromasa, Japanese nobleman (b. 918)
- Dado (or Dodon), Italian nobleman (approximate date)
- Domnall ua Néill (or Donal O'Neill), High King of Ireland
- Eoghan Ua Cathain, abbot of Clonfert (Ireland)
- Gunnhild, Norwegian Viking queen (approximate date)
- Ibn Khalawayh, Persian scholar and grammar (or 981)
- Liu Chang, emperor of Southern Han (b. 942)
- Yaropolk I, Grand Prince of Kiev (approximate date)
