= 1008 =

Calendar year

1008 in various calendars
- Gregorian calendar: 1008; MVIII
- Ab urbe condita: 1761
- Armenian calendar: 457; ԹՎ ՆԾԷ
- Assyrian calendar: 5758
- Balinese saka calendar: 929–930
- Bengali calendar: 414–415
- Berber calendar: 1958
- English Regnal year: N/A
- Buddhist calendar: 1552
- Burmese calendar: 370
- Byzantine calendar: 6516–6517
- Chinese calendar: 丁未年 (Fire Goat); 3705 or 3498 — to — 戊申年 (Earth Monkey); 3706 or 3499
- Coptic calendar: 724–725
- Discordian calendar: 2174
- Ethiopian calendar: 1000–1001
- Hebrew calendar: 4768–4769
- Hindu calendars
- Vikram Samvat: 1064–1065
- Shaka Samvat: 929–930
- Kali Yuga: 4108–4109
- Holocene calendar: 11008
- Igbo calendar: 8–9
- Iranian calendar: 386–387
- Islamic calendar: 398–399
- Japanese calendar: Kankō 5 (寛弘５年)
- Javanese calendar: 910–911
- Julian calendar: 1008; MVIII
- Korean calendar: 3341
- Minguo calendar: 904 before ROC 民前904年
- Nanakshahi calendar: −460
- Seleucid era: 1319/1320 AG
- Thai solar calendar: 1550–1551
- Tibetan calendar: མེ་མོ་ལུག་ལོ་ (female Fire-Sheep); 1134 or 753 or −19 — to — ས་ཕོ་སྤྲེ་ལོ་ (male Earth-Monkey); 1135 or 754 or −18

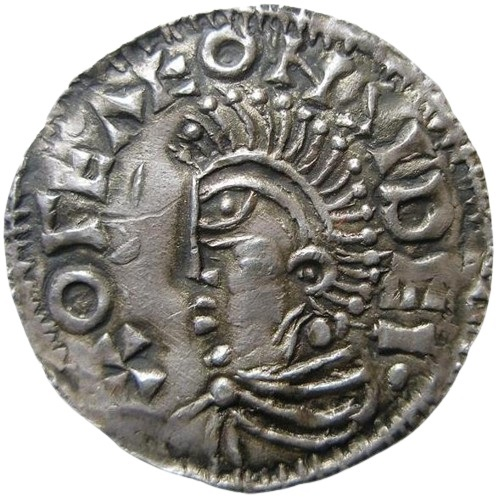
Coin of Olof Skötkonung (c. 980–1022)

Year 1008 (MVIII) was a leap year starting on Thursday of the Julian calendar.

== Events ==
=== By place ===
==== Europe ====
- Olaf Haraldsson, future king of Norway, makes raids in the Baltic Sea. He lands on the Estonian island of Saaremaa, wins a battle there, and forces the inhabitants to pay tribute.
- Battle at Herdaler: Olaf Haraldsson sails to the southern coast of Finland to plunder, where he and his men are ambushed and defeated in the woods.
- The oldest known mention is made of the city of Gundelfingen (Southern Germany).
- Unification of the Georgian realm.
- In England, King Æthelred the Unready orders a new fleet of warships built, organised on a national scale. It is a huge undertaking, but is completed the following year.

==== Arabian Empire ====
- Caliph Al-Hakim bi-Amr Allah sends a tributary mission to Emperor Zhenzong of the Song dynasty in order to reestablish trade relations between the Fatimid Caliphate and China (approximate date).

==== Japan ====
- November 13 – Kamo Special Festival: The poet Murasaki Shikibu is given her name from a famous court poet, Fujiwara no Kinto; this year she probably starts to write The Diary of Lady Murasaki.
- 42nd Birthday of Fujiwara no Michinaga, father-in-law of the emperor, is celebrated.

Vietnam

- Under the Early Lê dynasty, King Lê Long Đĩnh personally marched into battle to defeat the barbarians in Đô Lương and Vị Long provinces.

=== By topic ===
==== Religion ====
- Autumn – Bruno of Querfurt, a missionary bishop, and 18 companions sets out on a mission to spread Christianity among the Prussians.
- Olof Skötkonung, king of Sweden, is baptized in Husaby (Västergötland) by missionary Sigfrid, and makes generous donations on the spot.

== Births ==
- May 4 – Henry I, king of France (d. 1060)
- October 12 – Atsuhira, future Emperor Go-Ichijō of Japan (d. 1036)
- Al-Mu'izz ibn Badis, Zirid ruler of Ifriqiya (d. 1062)
- Anselm of Liège, French chronicler and historian
- Di Qing, general of the Song dynasty (d. 1057)
- Gothelo II (or Gozelo), duke of Lower Lorraine (d. 1046)
- Sugawara no Takasue, Japanese writer (approximate date)
- Wulfstan, bishop of Worcester (approximate date)

== Deaths ==
- March 17 – Kazan, emperor of Japan (b. 968)
- April 7 – Ludolf (or Liudolf), archbishop of Trier
- April 10 – Notker of Liège, French bishop (b. 940)
- May 25
  - Bishi, Japanese imperial princess
  - Matilda of Saxony, countess of Flanders
- October 6 – Menendo González, Galician nobleman
- November 20 – Geoffrey I, duke of Brittany (b. 980)
- Abd al-Malik al-Muzaffar, Andalusian court official
- Clothna mac Aenghusa, Irish poet (approximate date)
- Gunnlaugr Ormstunga, Icelandic poet (approximate date)
- Gurgen II (Magistros), king of Iberia-Kartli (Georgia)
- Ibn Zur'a, Abbasid physician and philosopher (b. 943)
- Madudan mac Gadhra Mór, king of Síol Anmchadha
- Poppo, Polish missionary bishop (approximate date)
- Raymond III, French nobleman (approximate date)
- Rotbold I (or Rotbaud), French nobleman
- Sarolt, Grand Princess of Hungary (b. 950)
