= Constitutio de feudis =

Law regarding feudal contracts in the Holy Roman Empire

The Constitutio de feudis ("Constitution of Fiefs"), also known as the Edictum de beneficiis regni Italici ("Edict on the Benefices of the Italian Kingdom"), was a law regulating feudal contracts decreed by the Emperor Conrad II on 28 May 1037 (Pentecost Eve) at Pavia, during his siege of Milan. It "had wider and more lasting effects on Italian society than any other piece of imperial legislation," and by "attract[ing] to the cities [the moderately-wealthy landowner, it] built a bridge at a high social level between city and countryside." According to Susan Reynolds, it "mark[s] the foundation of the academic law of fiefs", as it formed the basis for the Libri feudorum.

The law was based, in its own words, on the "legal code of our predecessors" (constitucio antecessorum nostrorum). It specified that "no knight [miles] who was the tenant of a bishop, abbot, marquis, count or any other might be deprived of his fief unless he were convicted" of a legal offense "by the judgement of his peers", and the right of a knight to appeal to the emperor or to an imperial representative was granted. One historian has described Conrad as satiating the vavassores’ "hunger for law". The emperor also limited his own right to fodrum, a tax in money levied whenever the emperor visited Italy, in order to please the greater feudatories whose rights over their knights he had just limited. It is not clear whether the knights who gained these rights were noblemen. They were sword-bearers, but they lacked prerequisites of legal freedom, such as judgement by one's peers and the right of appeal.

The Constitutio was ratified by Henry III of Germany, Conrad's son and heir, and, in 1040, by Archbishop Aribert II of Milan. It ensconced the vavassores in their benefices for life and made them hereditary, abrogating their dependence on the capitanei and thus amalgamating the two feudal classes into one broad land-owning class. This was Conrad's intention, as the preamble to the Constitutio states: "to reconcile the hearts of the magnates and the knights [milites] so that they may always be found harmonious and may faithfully and constantly serve us and their lords with devotion".

== Editions ==
- Ludwig Weiland, ed., "Edictum de beneficiis regni Italici", Mon. Germ. Hist., Constitutiones, I, No. 45, pp. 89–91.
