= Ludolf of Trier =

German clergyman (d. 1008)

Ludolf
- Archbishop of Trier
- Church: Catholic Church
- Diocese: Electorate of Trier
- In office: 994–1008

Personal details
- Died: 7 April 1008

Ludolf or Liudolf of Trier (died 7 April 1008, in Erpostede) was a German Roman Catholic clergyman.

He was born in the now-lost settlement of Erpostede in Stecklenburg and was an imperial chaplain, canon of Hildesheim Cathedral and probably a priest in Goslar. In 994 he was consecrated archbishop of Trier by Adalbero II of Metz. Shortly after entering office he came into conflict with the citizens of Trier and imposed an interdict on them. After Otto III's death he supported the election of Henry II. He built a wall around the cathedral quarter in Trier. He died in Erpostede in 1008 and was buried in Halberstadt Cathedral.

== See also ==
- Electorate of Trier
- Roman Catholic Diocese of Trier

== Sources ==
- Martin Persch: Ludolf von Trier. In: Biographisch-Bibliographisches Kirchenlexikon (BBKL). Band 5, Bautz, Herzberg 1993, ISBN 3-88309-043-3, Sp. 315–317.
