= Abd al-Jalil ibn Wahbun =

11th century Arab poet

- أبو محمد عبد الجليل بن وهبون
- Born: Abu Mohammed Abd al-Jalil ibn Wahbun
- Died: 1090
- Occupation: Poet
- Writing career
- Language: Arabic

Abu Mohammed Abd al-Jalil ibn Wahbun (Arabic: أبو محمد عبد الجليل بن وهبون) better known as simply Ibn Wahbun (died 1090), was a poet from Al Andalus in the 11th century.
