= 983 =

Calendar year

983 in various calendars
Gregorian calendar	983; CMLXXXIII
Ab urbe condita	1736
Armenian calendar	432; ԹՎ ՆԼԲ
Assyrian calendar	5733
Balinese saka calendar	904–905
Bengali calendar	389–390
Berber calendar	1933
Buddhist calendar	1527
Burmese calendar	345
Byzantine calendar	6491–6492
Chinese calendar	壬午年 (Water Horse); 3680 or 3473 — to — 癸未年 (Water Goat); 3681 or 3474
Coptic calendar	699–700
Discordian calendar	2149
Ethiopian calendar	975–976
Hebrew calendar	4743–4744
- Hindu calendars
Vikram Samvat	1039–1040
Shaka Samvat	904–905
Kali Yuga	4083–4084
Holocene calendar	10983
Iranian calendar	361–362
Islamic calendar	372–373
Japanese calendar	Tengen 6 / Eikan 1 (永観元年)
Javanese calendar	884–885
Julian calendar	983; CMLXXXIII
Korean calendar	3316
Minguo calendar	929 before ROC 民前929年
Nanakshahi calendar	−485
Seleucid era	1294/1295 AG
Thai solar calendar	1525–1526
Tibetan calendar	ཆུ་ཕོ་རྟ་ལོ་ (male Water-Horse); 1109 or 728 or −44 — to — ཆུ་མོ་ལུག་ལོ་ (female Water-Sheep); 1110 or 729 or −43

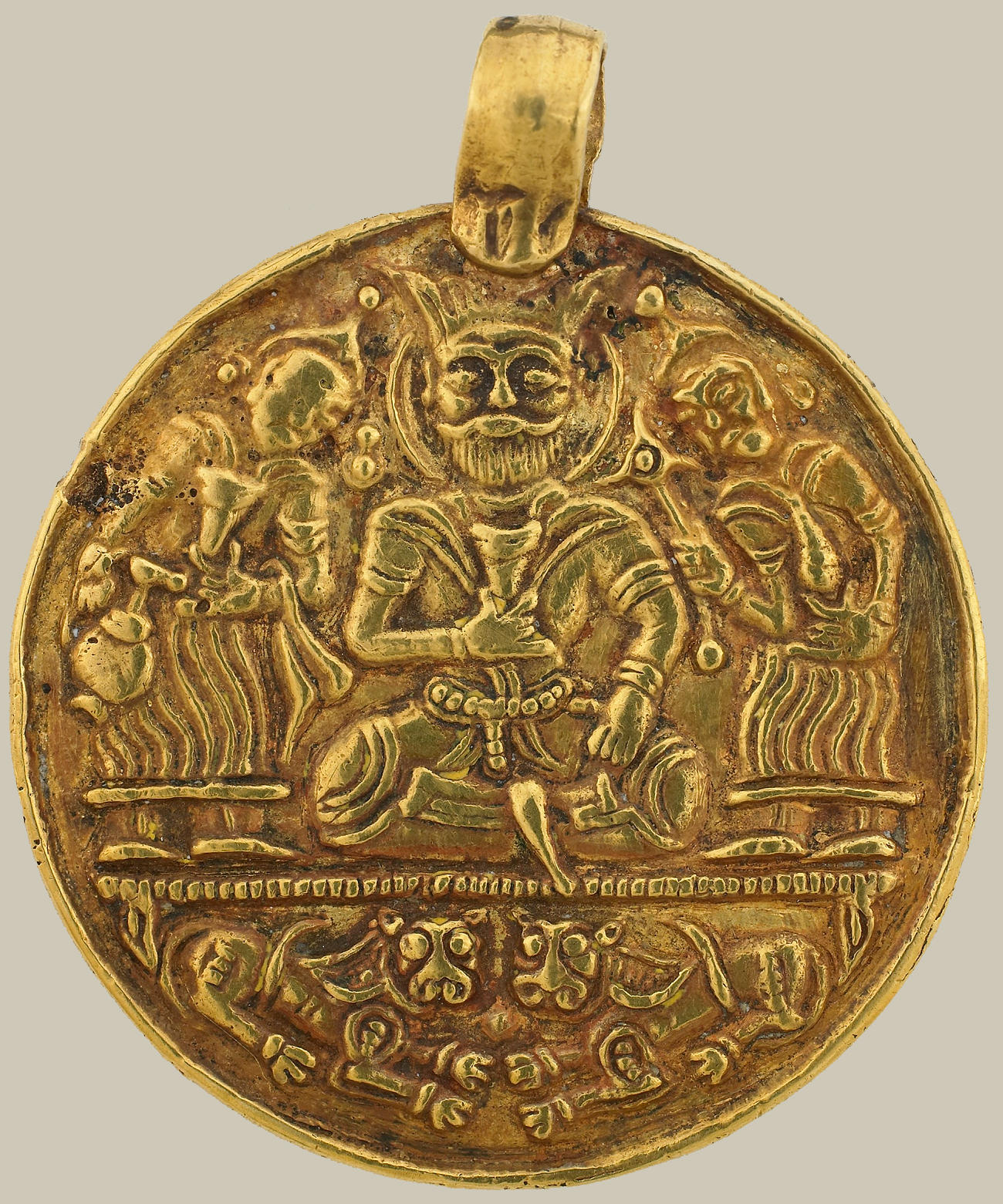
Medallion of 'Adud al-Dawla (936–983)

Year 983 (CMLXXXIII) was a common year starting on Monday of the Julian calendar.

== Events ==
=== By place ===
==== Europe ====
- Summer – Diet of Verona: Emperor Otto II (the Red) declares war against the Byzantine Empire and the Emirate of Sicily. He assembles a large expeditionary force for a renewal of an invasion in Calabria (Southern Italy). Otto gifts the Rheingau ("Rhine District") to the Archbishopric of Mainz during the 'Veronese donation'. Otto III is elected king of Germany and Italy.
- Great Slav Rising: The Polabian Slavs (Wends), mainly Lutici and Obotrite tribes living east of the Elbe River revolt against Christianity and their subjugation to the German (former East Frankish) realm of the Holy Roman Empire. They invade northern Germany, sacking the cities of Havelberg, Brandenburg and Hamburg.
- King Harald Bluetooth rebels against the overlordship of Otto II. A Danish Viking army under his son Sweyn Forkbeard invades the March of Schleswig – along the northern border of modern Denmark. The Sorb Slavs in northern Germany overrun and conquer the March of Zeitz (Marca Geronis) from Saxon control.
- December 7 – Otto II dies from a fever in his palace at Rome after a 10-year reign. He is succeeded by his 3-year-old son, Otto III.
- December 25 – Otto III is crowned at Aachen by Archbishops Willigis of Mainz and John X of Ravenna. The Holy Roman Empire comes under the regency of his mother, Empress consort Theophanu.

==== Arabian Empire ====
- March 26 – 'Adud al-Dawla, ruler (emir) of the Buyid Dynasty, dies after a 34-year reign. He is succeeded by his 20-year-old son Samsam al-Dawla, who is recognised by the Abbasid Caliphate. During al-Dawla's rule his dominions are divided through civil war and revolts (until 987).
- Fall – Fatimid troops under the defecting Hamdanid governor of Homs, Bakjur, attack Aleppo (modern Syria), but are repulsed through the intervention of the Byzantine army. Bardas Phokas (the Younger) sacks the city, while Bakjur flees to Fatimid territory in Egypt.

==== China ====
- Emperor Sheng Zong of the Khitan-led Liao Dynasty leads an expeditionary force against the Zubu after they killed their own khan and begin to act in defiance of the Khitan.
- One of the Four Great Books of Song, the encyclopedia Imperial Readings of the Taiping Era is completed in 1,000 volumes, of 4.7 million written Chinese characters.
- The printing of the first Chinese Buddhist canon, the Kaibao Canon, is completed.

=== By topic ===
==== Religion ====
- July 10 – Pope Benedict VII dies after a 9-year reign. Otto II secures the election of the imperial chancellor and appoints John XIV as the 136th pope of the Catholic Church.

== Births ==
- Abd al-Rahman Sanchuelo, Umayyad chief minister (d. 1009)
- Anthony of Kiev, Rus' monk and saint (d. 1073)
- Gunnlaugr Ormstunga, Icelandic poet (approximate date)
- Odo II, French nobleman and pretender (d. 1037)
- Wulfnoth Cild, Anglo-Norse nobleman (approximate date)

== Deaths ==
- March 26 – 'Adud al-Dawla, ruler of the Buyid Dynasty (b. 936)
- July 10 – Benedict VII, pope of the Catholic Church
- December 7 – Otto II, Holy Roman Emperor (b. 955)
- Aed Ua Dubhda, king of Uí Fiachrach (Ireland)
- Ælfhere, Anglo-Saxon ealdorman (approximate date)
- Antony III (the Studite), patriarch of Constantinople
- Ibrahim ibn Marzuban, ruler of the Sallarid Dynasty
- Minamoto no Muneyuki, Japanese nobleman and poet
- Minamoto no Shitagō, Japanese waka poet (b. 911)
- Mu'ayyad al-Dawla, ruler of the Buyid Dynasty (b. 942)
