= 956 =

Calendar year

956 in various calendars
- Gregorian calendar: 956; CMLVI
- Ab urbe condita: 1709
- Armenian calendar: 405; ԹՎ ՆԵ
- Assyrian calendar: 5706
- Balinese saka calendar: 877–878
- Bengali calendar: 362–363
- Berber calendar: 1906
- Buddhist calendar: 1500
- Burmese calendar: 318
- Byzantine calendar: 6464–6465
- Chinese calendar: 乙卯年 (Wood Rabbit); 3653 or 3446 — to — 丙辰年 (Fire Dragon); 3654 or 3447
- Coptic calendar: 672–673
- Discordian calendar: 2122
- Ethiopian calendar: 948–949
- Hebrew calendar: 4716–4717
- Hindu calendars
- Vikram Samvat: 1012–1013
- Shaka Samvat: 877–878
- Kali Yuga: 4056–4057
- Holocene calendar: 10956
- Iranian calendar: 334–335
- Islamic calendar: 344–345
- Japanese calendar: Tenryaku 10 (天暦１０年)
- Javanese calendar: 856–857
- Julian calendar: 956; CMLVI
- Korean calendar: 3289
- Minguo calendar: 956 before ROC 民前956年
- Nanakshahi calendar: −512
- Seleucid era: 1267/1268 AG
- Thai solar calendar: 1498–1499
- Tibetan calendar: ཤིང་མོ་ཡོས་ལོ་ (female Wood-Hare); 1082 or 701 or −71 — to — མེ་ཕོ་འབྲུག་ལོ་ (male Fire-Dragon); 1083 or 702 or −70

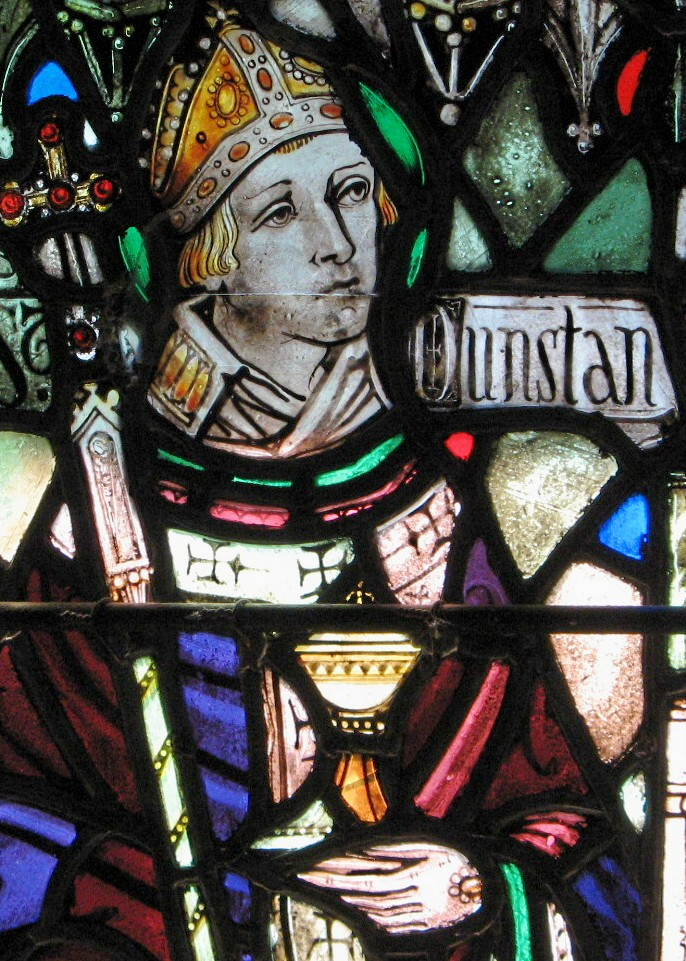
Dunstan, archbishop of Canterbury

Year 956 (CMLVI) was a leap year starting on Tuesday of the Julian calendar.

== Events ==
=== By place ===
==== Byzantine Empire ====
- Summer – Emperor Constantine VII appoints Nikephoros Phokas to commander of the Byzantine field army (Domestic of the Schools) in the East. He gives him order to prepare a campaign against the Hamdanid emir Sayf al-Dawla. Constantine makes treaties with neighbouring rulers, to seek military aid.
- September - October – A Byzantine fleet under Basil Hexamilites deals a crushing defeat to the Hamdanid fleet at Tarsus in Cilicia (modern Turkey).

==== Europe ====
- Liudolf, the eldest son of King Otto I (the Great), reconciles with his father and asks again for installation as duke of Swabia. Otto refuses, but at the instigation of his uncle Bruno I (duke of Lotharingia) allows Liudolf to lead an expedition to Italy to bring the vassal Berengar of Ivrea to heel.
- Berengar of Ivrea dispatches a Lombard army under his son Adalbert II to counter Liudolf, while he guards Pavia himself. In two battles Liudolf defeats the Lombard forces and enters Pavia, there to receive the homage of the Italian nobles and clergy on behalf of Otto I.
- June 16 – Hugh the Great, count of Paris, dies at Dourdan. He is succeeded by his eldest son Hugh Capet, who is recognized as Duke of the Franks by his cousin Lothair III, king of the West Frankish Kingdom.
- King Ordoño III dies at Zamora after a 5-year reign. He is succeeded by his half-brother Sancho I as ruler of León (modern Spain).

==== Egypt ====
- An earthquake badly damages the Lighthouse of Alexandria: one of the Seven Wonders of the Ancient World.

=== By topic ===
==== Religion ====
- Dunstan, an abbot of Glastonbury Abbey, is sent into exile by King Eadwig. He takes refuge in Flanders (modern Belgium), where Count Arnulf I gives him shelter in the Abbey of Mont Blandin, near Ghent.

== Births ==
- Siegfried II, count of Stade (d. 1037)
- probable
  - Adalbert of Prague, Bohemian bishop (approximate date)
  - Sampiro, Spanish bishop (approximate date)

== Deaths ==
- February 15 – Su Yugui, Chinese chancellor (b. 895)
- February 27 – Theophylact, Byzantine patriarch (b. 917)
- April 8 – Gilbert, duke of Burgundy
- April 15 – Lin Yanyu, Chinese court official and eunuch
- May 19 – Robert, archbishop of Trier
- June 4 – Muhammad II of Shirvan, Muslim ruler
- June 16 – Hugh the Great, Frankish nobleman (b. 898)
- July/August – Fulbert of Cambrai, bishop
- August – Ordoño III, king of León
- August 29 – Fu (the Elder), Chinese empress consort
- September/October – Al-Masudi, Muslim historian and geographer
- December 21 – Sun Sheng, Chinese chancellor
- December 26 – Wulfstan, archbishop of York
- date unknown
  - Ahmad al-Muhajir, Muslim scholar and imam (b. 873)
  - Congalach Cnogba, High King of Ireland
  - Gandaraditya, ruler of Chola Kingdom
  - Zhao Hongyin, Chinese general
