= Berengar of Gascony =

Berengar (French: Bérenger or Bélenger, Latin: Berengarius or Belengarius, Spanish: Berenguer) was the eldest son of Alausia, daughter of Sancho VI of Gascony, and Hilduin, Count of Angoulême. He succeeded to the Duchy of Gascony on Sancho's death in 1032.

He was either opposed immediately by his cousin Odo or acted as regent on his behalf. Either way, he appears to have been in power until his death in 1036, when Odo succeeded him.

In a charter dated to the episcopate of Geoffrey of Bordeaux, Berengar appears as Belengarius comes Vuasconiçe ac burdegalensis provinçie. Some have attempted to identify him with Berengar Raymond I of Barcelona, who was married to Sancho's sister Sancha (or Garcie), but this is impossible.

Though he is titled only as count in this and in the cartulary of Saint-Seurin, his charter contains a lozenge-shaped place for the attaching of a seal at the lower right, implying that he ruled in his own right as duke. He donated all the land of the Cadaujac with it dependencies to the church of Bordeaux, which appears to have been united still to Gascony at that time.

According to Jaurgain, Berenger never existed. He suggests that his invention resulted from misinterpretation of a charter dated to 1060 under which "Auriol Garsies de Navarra" granted property in Gascony which he held "ex comite Berlengerio" to Garcia Arnaud, Viscount of Dax, suggesting that "comes Berlenger" can be identified as Berenguer Ramon I, Count of Barcelona who happened to own some property in Gascony. His purported mother Alaisia's existence is uncertain, and his purported father Hilduin of Angoulême is actually married to the historically-attested Alaisia of Fronsac, daughter of Grimoard, Viscount of Fronsac.

== Sources ==
- Higounet, Charles. Bordeaux pendant le haut moyen age. Bordeaux, 1963.
