= Yeli Renrong =

Scholar official of the Western Xia

- 𘘥𗎁𗸯𘄊
- Yeli Renrong in Tangut script
- Died: 1042; Western Xia
- Occupation: Official
- Known for: Creating the Tangut script

Chinese name
- Traditional Chinese: 野利仁榮
- Simplified Chinese: 野利仁荣
Transcriptions
Standard Mandarin
- Hanyu Pinyin: Yělì Rénróng

Yeli Renrong (Tangut: 𘘥𗎁𗸯𘄊; traditional Chinese: 野利仁榮; simplified Chinese: 野利仁荣, died 1042) was a scholar and official who served in the court of the Western Xia dynasty of China. He is known for creating the Tangut script, which was used to write the Tangut language.

== Life ==
Yeli Renrong was a trusted official of the Western Xia founder Emperor Jingzong. According to the official History of Song, the Emperor Jingzong commanded him to design the complex Tangut script in 1036, based on Chinese writing, for use in writing the Tangut language. The book promulgating the script was completed in 12 volumes. The script would go on to see regular use in government business, translations of Tibetan and Chinese texts, and diplomatic texts. The script was often used with woodblock printing.

In 1039, a Tangut script school was established, which Yeli Renrong oversaw.

Yeli Renrong died in 1042 and was given the posthumous title of Marquis of Fuping (富平侯).

== Legacy ==
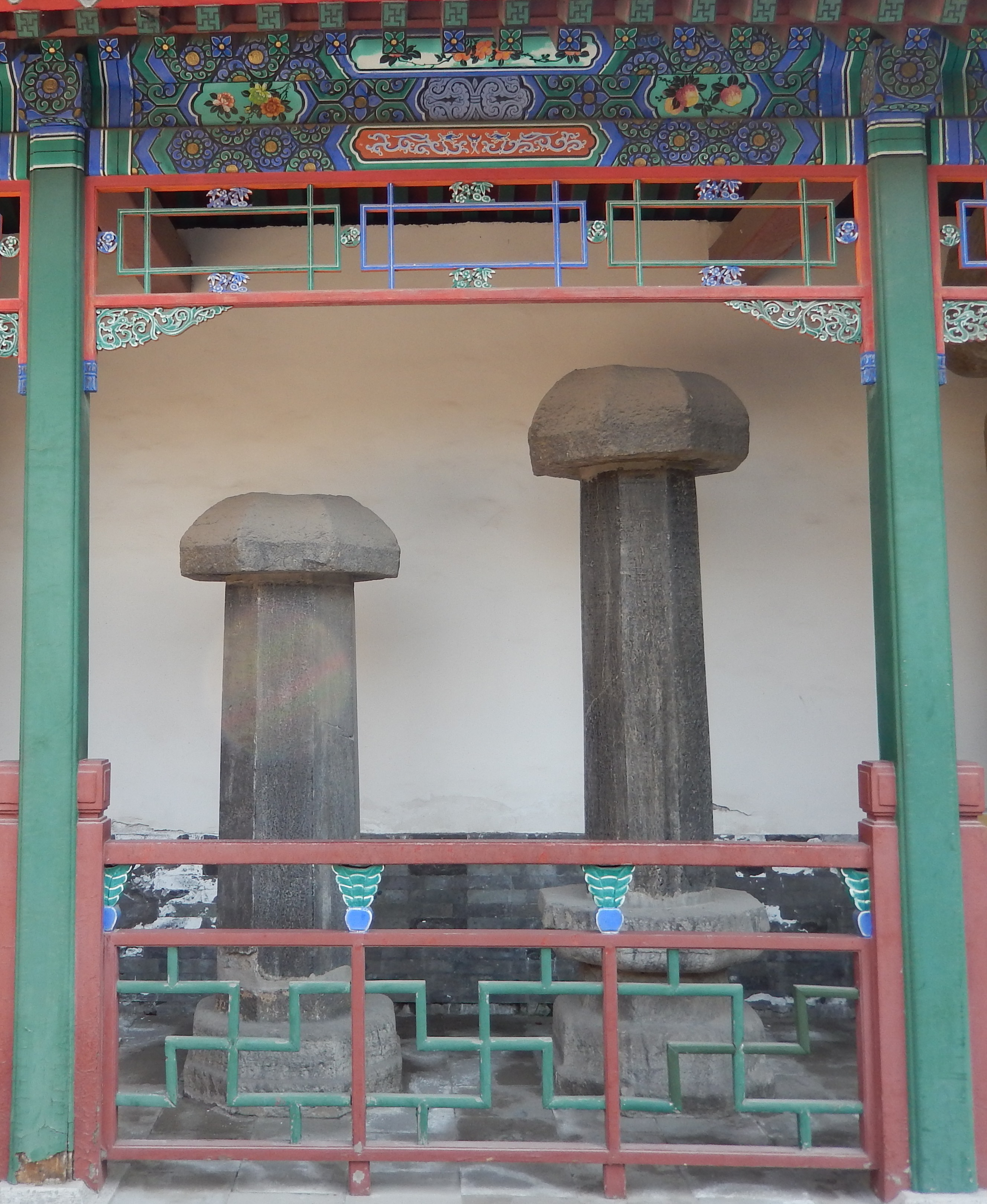
Tangut dharani pillars on display at the Ancient Lotus Pond in Baoding (Pillar A on the left, Pillar B on the right).

After its creation in 1036, the Tangut script would be used for around five centuries, with the last known inscription being written on the Tangut dharani pillars, erected in 1502. In his 14th year, 1162, Emperor Renzong of Western Xia posthumously gave Yeli Renrong the title of Prince Guanghui (廣惠王).

== Media portrayals ==
=== TV series ===
Year	Nation	Work	Actor
1995	China	Helan Xue (賀蘭雪)	Peng Jun (彭军)

=== Movies ===
Year	Nation	Work	Actor
1988	Japan	Dunhuang (敦煌)	Mizuho Suzuki (鈴木瑞穗)

=== Documentaries ===
Year	Nation	Work	Actor
2015	China	Shenbi de Xi Xia (神秘的西夏)	Cai Aojun (蔡翱俊)
