= 1086 =

1086 in various calendars
- Gregorian calendar: 1086; MLXXXVI
- Ab urbe condita: 1839
- Armenian calendar: 535; ԹՎ ՇԼԵ
- Assyrian calendar: 5836
- Balinese saka calendar: 1007–1008
- Bengali calendar: 492–493
- Berber calendar: 2036
- English Regnal year: 20 Will. 1 – 21 Will. 1
- Buddhist calendar: 1630
- Burmese calendar: 448
- Byzantine calendar: 6594–6595
- Chinese calendar: 乙丑年 (Wood Ox); 3783 or 3576 — to — 丙寅年 (Fire Tiger); 3784 or 3577
- Coptic calendar: 802–803
- Discordian calendar: 2252
- Ethiopian calendar: 1078–1079
- Hebrew calendar: 4846–4847
- Hindu calendars
- Vikram Samvat: 1142–1143
- Shaka Samvat: 1007–1008
- Kali Yuga: 4186–4187
- Holocene calendar: 11086
- Igbo calendar: 86–87
- Iranian calendar: 464–465
- Islamic calendar: 478–479
- Japanese calendar: Ōtoku 3 (応徳３年)
- Javanese calendar: 990–991
- Julian calendar: 1086; MLXXXVI
- Korean calendar: 3419
- Minguo calendar: 826 before ROC 民前826年
- Nanakshahi calendar: −382
- Seleucid era: 1397/1398 AG
- Thai solar calendar: 1628–1629
- Tibetan calendar: ཤིང་མོ་གླང་ལོ་ (female Wood-Ox); 1212 or 831 or 59 — to — མེ་ཕོ་སྟག་ལོ་ (male Fire-Tiger); 1213 or 832 or 60

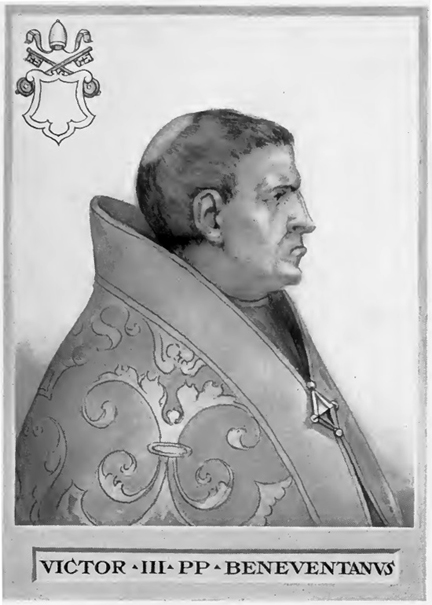
Pope Victor III (c. 1026–1087)

Year 1086 (MLXXXVI) was a common year starting on Thursday of the Julian calendar.

== Events ==
=== By place ===
==== Europe ====
- October 23 – Battle of Sagrajas: Spanish forces under King Alfonso VI ("the Brave") of Castile are defeated by the Moors and their allies, the Almoravids, who have been invited to help on orders by Emir Al-Mu'tamid ibn Abbad.
- Siege of Syracuse (1086) – Norman forces under Count Roger I ("Bosso") conquer Syracuse, the last Muslim stronghold in Sicily.

==== England ====
- August 1 – King William the Conqueror calls for a meeting at Old Sarum, where he invites his major vassals and tenants-in-chief to swear allegiance to him. This is known as the Oath of Salisbury.
- The Domesday Book is completed. Drawn up on the orders of William I; it describes in detail the landholdings and resources in England.
- The population in England is estimated to be 1.25 million citizens with 10% living in boroughs.

==== Seljuk Empire ====
- Summer – Suleiman ibn Qutulmish, ruler of the Turks in Rum, is killed by Emir Tutush I in the battle of Ain Salm near Antioch. Suleiman's 7-year-old son Kilij Arslan I is captured and transferred as hostage to Isfahan (modern Iran).
- Sultan Malik-Shah I rebuilds the Imam Ali Mosque in Najaf (modern Iraq), after it was destroyed by fire.

=== By topic ===
==== Religion ====
- May 24 – Pope Victor III succeeds Gregory VII as the 158th pope of the Catholic Church, though he does not accept election until 1087.

== Births ==
- April 24 – Ramiro II ("the Monk"), king of Aragon (d. 1157)
- August 11 – Henry V, Holy Roman Emperor (d. 1125)
- August 20 – Bolesław III Wrymouth, duke of Poland (d. 1138)
- al-Shahrastani, Persian scholar and historian (d. 1153)
- Þorlákur Runólfsson, Icelandic bishop (d. 1133)
- Vicelinus, bishop of Oldenburg in Holstein (d. 1154)
- Zhang Jun, Chinese general and official (d. 1154)

== Deaths ==
- March 15 – Richilde, countess and regent of Flanders
- March 18 – Anselm of Lucca, Italian bishop (b. 1036)
- May 21 – Wang Anshi, Chinese chancellor (b. 1021)
- July 10 – Canute IV ("the Holy"), king of Denmark
- July 14 – Toirdelbach Ua Briain, Irish king (b. 1009)
- July 17 – García Ramírez, Aragonese bishop
- August 8 – Conrad I, count of Luxembourg (b. 1040)
- September 25 – William VIII, duke of Aquitaine
- October 11 – Sima Guang, Chinese politician (b. 1019)
- October 23 – Rodrigo Muñoz, Galician nobleman
- December 25 – Judith of Bohemia, duchess of Poland
- Gregory Pakourianos, Byzantine politician and general, killed in battle
- Huizong, Chinese emperor (Western Xia) (b. 1060)
- Mael Ísu Ua Brolcháin, Irish monk and writer
- Muhammad ibn Ammar, Moorish poet (b. 1031)
- Odo I of Furneaux (or 'Eudes'), French nobleman (b. 1040)
- Suleiman ibn Qutulmish, ruler of the Sultanate of Rum, killed in battle
