= Gebhard II (bishop of Regensburg) =

Roman Catholic bishop

Gebhard II, called Gebhard von Hohenwart, was the bishop of Regensburg (or Ratisbon) from 1023 to 17 March 1036.

He succeeded Gebhard I. On his death, he was succeeded by Gebhard III.
