= Abu'l-Hasan Mihyar al-Daylami =

Persian poet

- Born: Mihyar al-Daylami; Daylam, Iran
- Died: 1037 AD
- Occupation: Poet
- Writing career
- Language: Arabic
- Period: Buyid period
- Genres: Ghazal, riddles, elegies
- Notable works: Elegies on Ali and Husayn ibn Ali

Abu'l-Hasan Mihyar al-Daylami (died 1037) was an Arabic-language poet of Daylamite origin during the Buyid period. Mihyar's poetry was dominated by metaphor, and he wrote in various poetic genres including ghazal, riddles, as well as writing elegies on Ali and Husayn ibn Ali.

A former Zoroastrian, Mihyar was converted to Shia Islam by his teacher who was also poet. Ibn Khallikan narrates that Mihyar was harshly rebuked by an acquaintance for reviling the companions of Muhammad.

Ibn Khallikan, who said Mihyar's works were so high in number that it fills four volumes, opined that Mihyar's writings "displayed great delicacy of thought and a remarkable loftiness of mind." However, Mihyar's poetic style was criticized for being "artificial and derivative."

== See also ==
- List of Persian poets and authors
- Persian literature
