= Ibn al-Thahabi =

Abu Mohammed Abdellah Ibn Mohammed Al-Azdi (Arabic: ابو محمد عبدالله بن محمد الأزدي) (ca. ? - 1033 CE), known also as Ibn Al-Thahabi or Ibn al-Zahabi was an Arab physician, famous for writing the first known alphabetical encyclopedia of medicine.

== Biography ==
He was born in Suhar, Oman. He moved then into Basra, then to Persia where he studied under Al-Biruni and Ibn Sina. Later he migrated to Jerusalem and finally settled in Valencia, in Al-Andalus (Islamic Spain).

== Works ==
He is famous for his book Kitab Al-Ma'a (The Book of Water), a medical encyclopedia that lists the names of diseases, medicines, physiological processes, and treatments. It is the first known alphabetical classification of medical terms. In this encyclopedia, Ibn Al-Thahabi not only lists the names but adds numerous original ideas about the function of the human organs. The book also contains an array of herbal treatments and a course for the treatment psychological symptoms. The main thesis is that cure must start from controlled food and exercise; if it persists then use specific individual medicines; if it still persists then use medical compounds; and if the disease continues, surgery is performed.

== See also ==
- List of Arab scientists and scholars
- Islamic scholars
- Islamic medicine
