= Muhammad al-Baghdadi =

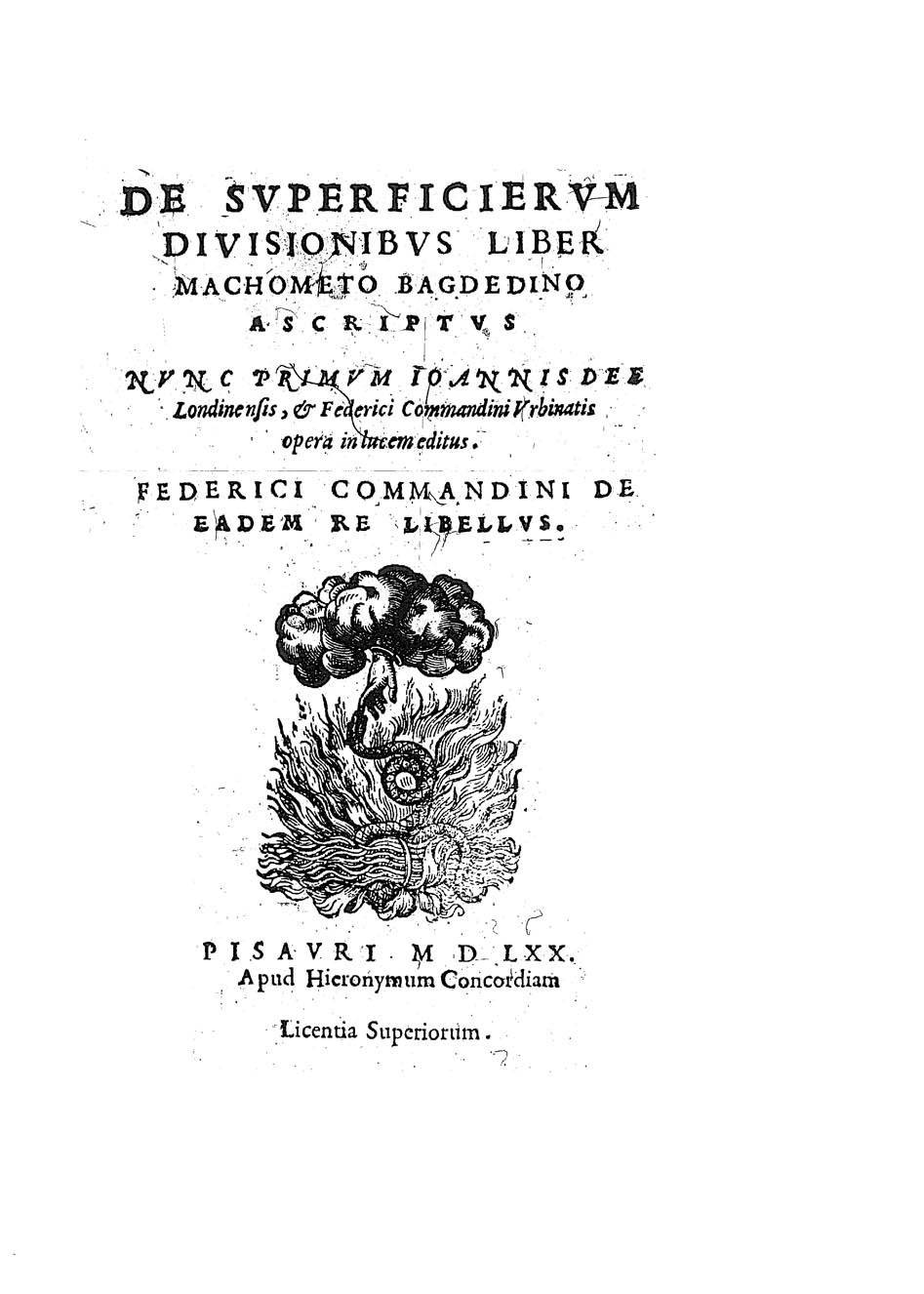
De superficierum divisionibus, 1570

Abū Bakr Muḥammad Ibn ‘Abd al-Bāqī al-Baghdadi al-Ansārī al-Kaabī (1050-1141) (Arabic: محمد بن عبد الباقي البغدادي) also known as Qadi al-Maristan, was an Arab jurist and mathematician.

He was the author of a commentary on the tenth book of Euclid's Elements, which was translated by Gerard of Cremona as Liber judei super decimum Euclidis. The work was popular in Europe with several Latin manuscripts still extant.

Other works include:

- Jadawil al-Jayb al-Mahlul al-Daqiqa (detailed tables of sines for each minute),
- Risala fi Taqrib Usul al-Hisab fi' al-Jabr wa-‘l-Muqabala (Treatise on approximation of principles of arithmetic)
- Kitab al-Tabaqat fi Sharh al-Misaha (book on measurements)

== Machometus Bagdedinus ==
Muhammad Ibn ‘Abd al-Bāqī has been identified by modern scholars with the Latin name, Machometus Bagdedinus, although this identification is sometimes disputed. Machometus Bagdedinus, was an Arab author whose translated work, De superficierum divisionibus liber, contains the only trace of Euclid's work "On Divisions of Figures" in the Latin tradition. The work was later printed in 1570, edited by John Dee and Federico Commandino.
