= Fujiwara no Atsuie =

Fujiwara no Atsuie (藤原 敦家; 1033–1090) was a Japanese nobleman and gagaku musician poet of the Heian period.

== Life ==
Fujiwara no Atsuie was a son of Fujiwara no Kanetsune, a member of the Michitsuna lineage (道綱流) of the Northern Branch of the Fujiwara clan. His mother was a daughter of Fujiwara no Takaie. He was born in 1033. His younger brother Akitsuna was a close associate of Emperor Shirakawa.

Over the course of his career at court, he held a variety of positions including governor of Iyo Province and Middle Captain of the Left. In Jiryaku 4 (1068) he was named Head Chamberlain and Captain of the Left Division of the Bureau of Horses. By the end of his career was of Senior Fourth Rank, Lower Grade.

He married Akitsuna's daughter Kenshi and by her had a son, Atsukane (ja).

On the thirteenth day of the seventh month of Kaniji 4 (11 August 1090 in the Julian calendar), Atsuie died suddenly. He was on his way home from a pilgrimage to Mount Kinpu. He was 58 (by Japanese reckoning).

== Musical career ==
Wanibe no Mochimitsu (和邇部用光) trained him to play the hichiriki.
