= Vavasour =

Feudal term for a baron's tenant with his own respective tenants

A vavasour (also vavasor; Old French: vavassor, vavassour; Modern French: vavasseur; Italian: valvassore, varvassore; Catalan: vavasuresh; Late Latin: vavassor) is a term in feudal law. A vavasour was the vassal or tenant of a baron, one who held his tenancy under a baron, and who also had tenants under him.

== Definition and derivation ==
The derivation of the word is obscure. It may be derived from vassi ad valvas (at the folding-doors, valvae), i.e. servants of the royal antechamber. Du Cange regarded it merely as an obscure variant of vassus, probably from vassus vassorum "vassal of the vassals". Alternative spellings include vavasor, valvasor, vasseur, vasvassor, oavassor, and others.

In its most general sense the word thus indicated a mediate vassal, i.e. one holding a fief under a vassal. The word was, however, applied at various times to the most diverse ranks in the feudal hierarchy, being used practically as the synonym of vassal. Thus tenants-in-chief of the crown are described by Emperor Conrad II as valvassores majores, as distinguished from mediate tenants, valvassores minores.

Gradually the term without qualification was found convenient for describing sub-vassals, tenants-in-chief being called capitanei or barones; but its implication, however, still varied in different places and times. Bracton ranked the magnates seu valvassores between barons and knights; for him they are "men of great dignity," and in this order they are found in a charter of King Henry II of England (1166). But in the regestum of King Philip II Augustus of France we find that five vavassors are reckoned as the equivalent of one knight. Finally, Du Cange quotes two charters, one of 1187, another of 1349, in which vavassors are clearly distinguished from nobles.

Vavasours subdivide again to vassals, exchanging land and cattle, human or otherwise, against fealty. - Motley.

== In fiction ==
- Used as a Christian name (Colonel Vavasour Devorax) in the novel A Crowning Mercy by Bernard Cornwell and Susannah Kells (a.k.a. Judy Cornwell).
- Used twice as a surname by Dorothy L. Sayers, once in Murder Must Advertise (Miss Ethel Vavasour, Jim Tallboy's girlfriend), and once in Have His Carcase (Maurice Vavasour, a pseudonym of the murderer).
- Used as a surname by John Banville in The Sea (Miss Vavasour).
- Used in Arthurian Romances, by Chretien de Troyes in Perceval: The Story of the Grail (Everyman Classics, 1991). "You can say that the vavasor who fitted on your spur taught and instructed you." p. 397.
- Vavasor is a surname in Anthony Trollope's Can You Forgive Her?
- Used in The Sandman graphic novel (1989, issue 10) as well as its television adaptation (2022, episode 7)
- Vavasor is the surname of a Some Girls character: Holli Jane Vavasor, played by Natasha Jonas.
- Used as the Christian name of Sir Vavasour Firebrace, a proud baronet, in Disraeli's Sybil.
- Used in William Morris' The Well at the World's End where King Peter's subjects are described as "sturdy vavassors" who would not accept "masterful doings".

== In popular culture ==
In the 1980s TV series The Paper Chase, Season 2, Episode 16 ("My Dinner with Kingsfield"), Contract Law Professor Charles W. Kingsfield plays the word "vavasor" and earns 60 points in a Scrabble game with his student James T. Hart while staying at Hart's residence during a snowstorm that has immobilized Kingsfield's car. He defines the word to Hart (who has never heard it before) as a "medieval term for 'tenant slightly below a baron.'"

== See also ==
- Feu
- Mesne lord
