= Baba Kuhi of Shiraz =

Persian Sufi mystic and poet

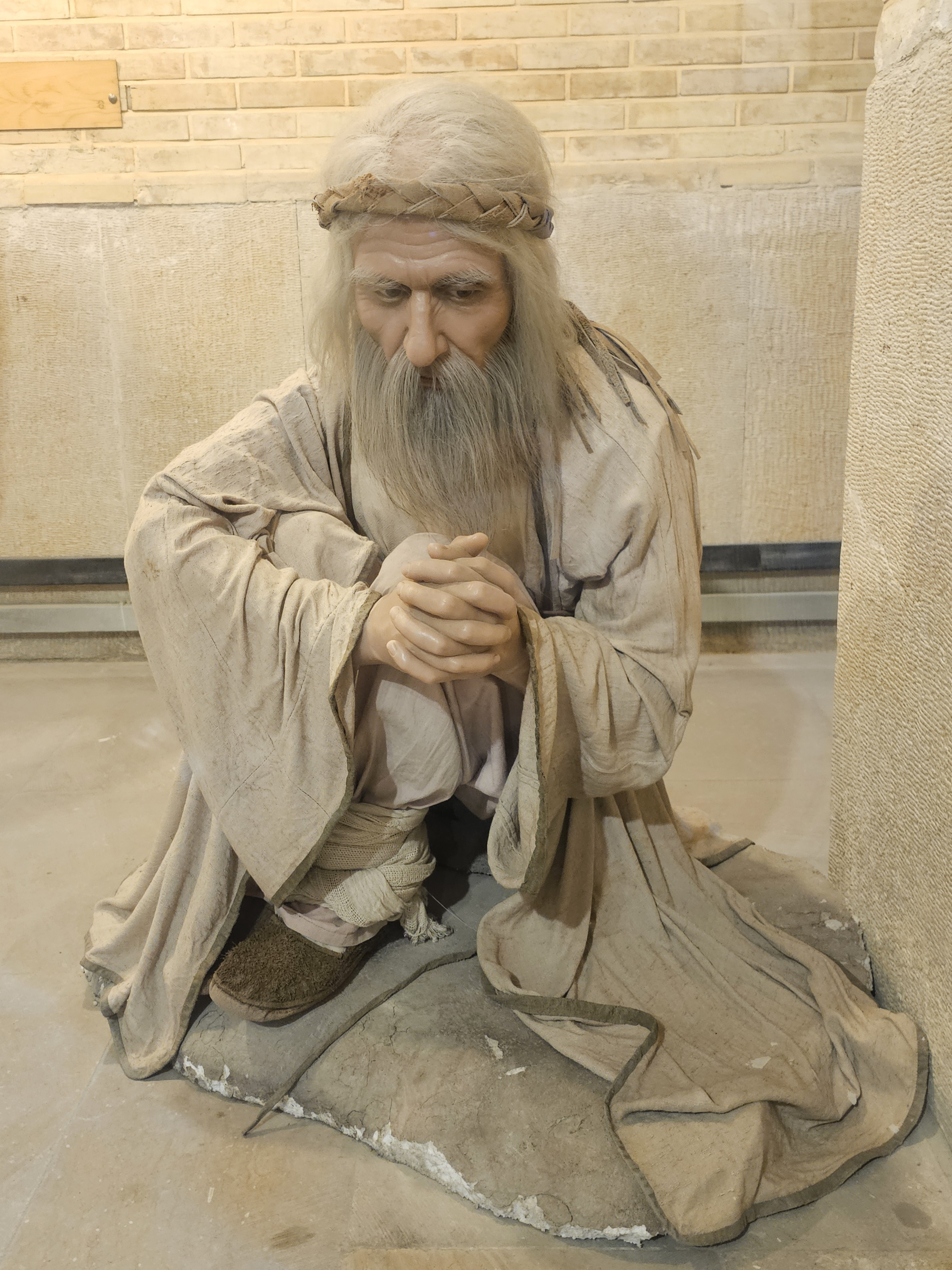
Statue of Baba Kuhi in Shiraz

Baba Kuhi of Shiraz (948 - 1037 CE) was a 10th- and 11th-century Persian Sufi mystic. Probably born in Shiraz (now in Southern Iran). As a young man he met the Arab poet Al-Mutanabbi and the well-known Sufi Abū ʿAbdallāh Moḥammad.
