= 970s =

Decade

The 970s decade ran from January 1, 970, to December 31, 979.

== Events ==
=== By place ===
==== Byzantine Empire ====
- Emperor John I delegates the war in the Balkans to his brother-in-law, the Domestic of the Schools Bardas Skleros, and to the eunuch general Peter Phokas, who begin to gather a Byzantine army in Thrace. At the news of this, a powerful Kievan expeditionary force (30,000 men), along with many Bulgarians and a Pecheneg contingent, is sent south over the Balkan Mountains. After sacking the Bulgarian stronghold of Philippolis (modern-day Plovdiv), they bypass the heavily defended city of Adrianople, and turn towards Constantinople.
- Battle of Arcadiopolis: John I dispatches an elite force (10–12,000 men) to delay the Kievan Rus'. The Byzantines under Bardas Skleros successfully ambush the Kievan-Bulgarian invaders at Arcadiopolis (modern Turkey). The battle turns into a complete rout, killing thousands. Grand Prince Sviatoslav I is driven out of Thrace and withdraws his forces to the fortress city of Silistra.
- Summer – Bardas Phokas (the Younger) and his family rebel against their own cousin, John I. Bardas is proclaimed 'emperor' by his troops at Caesarea, but the rebellion is extinguished by Bardas Skleros. Phokas and his relatives are captured and exiled to the island of Chios (Aegean Sea).

==== Europe ====
- Summer – Byzantine-Imperial truce: Emperor Otto I (the Great) meets with John I at Bari and accepts a permanent peace agreement. Pandulf I (Ironhead) is released from captivity in Constantinople (see 969).
- The oldest preserved document (by Otto I) mentions Leibnitz in Styria (modern Austria).
- Eric the Victorious becomes the first (documented) king of Sweden in Uppland.
- Skagul Toste leads a Viking expedition to England and demands Danegeld.

==== Africa ====
- Al-Hasan ibn Ubayd Allah, Ikhshidid governor of Palestine, is defeated and taken prisoner by General Ja'far ibn Fallah in Syria. Ending the Ikhshidid Dynasty as a ruling power.
- Construction is completed on Al-Azhar Mosque in Cairo, Egypt (the world's oldest Islamic university).

==== Asia ====
- A major volcano erupts in Lake Mashū, Japan (approximate date).

=== By place ===
==== Byzantine Empire ====
- Battle of Dorostolon: A Byzantine expeditionary army (possibly 30–40,000 men) attacks the Bulgarian frontier, personally led by Emperor John I. He lays siege to the fortress city of Dorostolon (located on the Lower Danube), and is reinforced by a fleet of 300 ships equipped with Greek fire. The Kievan Rus' and their Bulgarian allies are reduced to extremities by famine. After a 3-month siege, Grand Prince Sviatoslav I agrees to sign a peace treaty with the Byzantines, whereby he renounces his interests towards Bulgarian lands and the city of Chersonesos in Crimea. Sviatoslav is allowed to evacuate his army to Berezan Island, while the Byzantines enter Dorostolon. John renames the city Theodoropolis (named after the reigning Empress Theodora).
- John I returns in triumph to Constantinople. He brings along Boris II, ruler (tsar) of the Bulgarian Empire, and his family, together with the contents of the Bulgarian imperial treasury. Boris is given the Byzantine 'court title' of magistros as compensation. The Bulgarian lands in Thrace and Lower Moesia become part of the Byzantine Empire.

==== Europe ====
- Otto I 'the Great', Holy Roman Emperor, appoints his imperial secretary Willigis as chancellor (guardian of the emperor's seal), an office formerly held by Otto's brother, Archbishop Bruno I.

==== Britain ====
- King Cuilén (or Cuilean) is killed by Britons after a 6-year reign. He is succeeded by his nephew Kenneth II, as ruler of Alba (Scotland). He will not be sole king until 977.

==== Middle East ====
- Battle of Alexandretta: The Byzantines defeat a Fatimid force (4,000 men) near Alexandretta (modern Turkey), while the main Fatimid army is besieging the fortress city of Antioch. Coupled with news of an advance against Damascus of the Qarmatians, the Fatimids are forced to lift the siege and withdraw to Egypt.
- First Qarmatian invasion of Egypt: The Qarmatians under al-Hasan al-A'sam invade Syria, recently conquered by the Fatimid Caliphate, capturing Damascus and Ramla, defeating a major Fatimid army and blockading another in Jaffa. A subsequent invasion of Egypt leads to widespread anti-Fatimid revolts in the Nile Delta, but the delay allows the Fatimid general Jawhar to prepare his defences, leading to the decisive Qarmatian at Ayn Shams on 24 December and the collapse of the invasion.

==== Asia ====
- Emperor Aditya Chola II, co-regent of the Chola dynasty (modern India), is murdered and succeeded by Uttama. Due to his immaturity, Arunmozhi Varman becomes the heir apparent.

==== China ====
- January 23 – A war elephant corps of the Southern Han is defeated at Shao, by crossbow fire from Song dynasty troops. The Southern Han Kingdom is forced to submit to the Song dynasty. Ending Southern Han rule, but also the first regular war elephant corps employed in a Chinese army, that had gained the Southern Han victories throughout the 10th century.

=== By topic ===
==== Religion ====
- The grave of Swithun, Anglo-Saxon bishop of Winchester, is moved into an indoor shrine (he was previously buried outside) in the Old Minster. The ceremony is said to have been marred by 40 days of torrential rain.

=== By place ===
==== Byzantine Empire ====
- Spring – Emperor John I Tzimiskes divides the Bulgarian territories, recently held by the Kievan Rus', into six new themes. He turns his attention to the East against the Abbasid Caliphate and its vassals, beginning with an invasion of Upper Mesopotamia. John transfers Byzantine troops to Macedonia, and the region of Philippopolis in Thrace, to dilute the Slavs.
- John I removes various Bulgarian boyars from their homes, and settles them in Constantinople and Anatolia (modern Turkey), where they are given high titles and lands.
- John I grants a charter for the Monastic Republic of Holy Mount Athos, in Greece.

==== Europe ====
- Spring – Grand Prince Sviatoslav I is ambushed by the Pechenegs (possibly in the service of the Byzantines) and killed during his attempt to cross the Dnieper rapids (modern Ukraine). His skull is made into a drinking cup. Sviatoslav is succeeded by his eldest son Yaropolk I as ruler of Kiev, which leads to a civil war with his brother Oleg.
- April 14 – Otto II (the Red), joint-ruler and son of Otto I (the Great), marries the Byzantine princess Theophanu (niece or granddaughter of John I). She is crowned empress by Pope John XIII at Rome. Creating an alliance between the Ottonian Dynasty and the Byzantine Empire (called the Tzimiscian Peace).
- June 24 – Battle of Cedynia: The Polans under prince (or Duke) Mieszko I, defeat the German forces of the Saxon count Odo I at their stronghold in Cedynia (with the help of hidden reinforcements). The battle – one of the first in Polish history – strengthens Mieszko's hold over Western Pomerania.

==== Africa ====
- Buluggin ibn Ziri is appointed viceroy in Ifriqiya (modern Tunisia) and becomes the first ruler (emir) of the Zirid Dynasty.

=== By topic ===
==== Religion ====
- September 6 – John XIII dies at Rome after a 6-year reign. He is succeeded by Benedict VI as the 134th pope of the Catholic Church.
- The monastery at the site of Peterborough Cathedral is rebuilt by Dunstan, archbishop of Canterbury.

=== By place ===
==== Byzantine Empire ====
- Spring – The Byzantine army, led by General Melias (Domestic of the Schools in the East), continues the operations in Upper Mesopotamia.
- July: Melias moves against Amida (modern Turkey). He defeats the Arabs outside the walls, and begins to lay siege to the city. After a few days, a violent wind and a thick dust spreads over the Byzantine camp. Covered by the dust, the Arabs attack and rout the Byzantines. Many of them are slaughtered and some, including Melias, are taken prisoner. Previous Byzantine gains in the area are lost. The wounded Melias dies later in captivity.

==== Europe ====
- May 7 – Emperor Otto I (the Great) dies at Memleben in Thuringia (modern Germany) after a 37-year reign. He is succeeded by his 18-year-old son Otto II (the Red), who becomes absolute ruler of the Holy Roman Empire. His mother Adelaide will exert great influence on Otto, although her lavish philanthropies will be a source of contention. Otto's succession leads to conflicts in the south German duchies and in Lotharingia.

==== Britain ====
- Edgar I (the Peaceful) is crowned king during a royal ceremony at Bath by Archbishop Dunstan. In a council at Chester, Lothian (a region of the Lowlands) is ceded to Scotland, in return for fealty from King Kenneth II.
- Edgar I marches with his army north to Chester. His navy meets him there via the Irish Sea. This show of strength persuades the 'Northern Kings' to submit to his overlordship (approximate date).

==== Africa ====
- Caliph Al-Mu'izz transfers the royal residence of the Fatimid Caliphate from El-Mansuriya (modern Tunisia) to the newly founded city of Cairo in Egypt. Egypt becomes the autonomous centre of the Fatimid Caliphate. He leaves general Buluggin ibn Ziri to govern the Western North African territories, which will become the province of Al-Maghreb (meaning the West).

=== By topic ===
==== Commerce ====
- Cloves, ginger, black pepper, and other Eastern spices are available for purchase in the marketplace at Mainz. The spices are brought to the city by Jewish traveling merchants, known as the Radhanites, who have contacts in the international trade between the Christian and Islamic world (approximate date).

==== Religion ====
- January 19 – Pope Benedict VI is consecrated as the 134th pope of the Catholic Church. He is installed at Rome with the approval of Otto I and becomes a puppet ruler of the Holy Roman Empire. The Roman aristocracy resents Otto's dominance in Roman civil and ecclesiastical affairs.
- In the Council of Winchester, Edgar I accepts a 'Monastic Agreement' (called the Regularis Concordia). The document is compiled by Bishop Æthelwold and serves as a rule for how monastic life should be performed.

=== By place ===
==== Europe ====
- Battle of Danevirke: Emperor Otto II defeats the rebel forces of King Harald I, who has invaded Nordalbingia (modern-day Holstein), to shake off imperial overlordship. Otto's armies swiftly subdue the Danes, consolidating the frontier between Scandinavia and Northern Germany. Meanwhile, Henry II begins a rebellion against his cousin Otto. He forges alliances with Bavarian and Saxon nobles.

==== England ====
- King Edgar I gives English help to Prince Hywel in ousting his uncle, King Iago of Gwynedd from his kingdom.
- A great earthquake occurs in England.

==== Abbasid Caliphate ====
- 5 August – Caliph al-Muti, ill and incapacitated, is deposed and succeeded by his son al-Ta'i, dying shortly after.

==== Africa ====
- The Qarmatians are defeated north of Cairo by Fatimid forces under General Jawhar al-Siqilli. He consolidates Fatimid rule and sends a legation to the Christian land of Nubia to secure the southern border of Egypt. Arab traders introduce Islam to the population, which gradually supplants Christianity.
- An offensive, by the Spain-based Caliphate of Córdoba brings the Maghrebi Idrisid Dynasty to an end. Caliph Al-Hakam II maintains the supremacy of the caliphate over the kingdoms of Navarra, Castile and León.

==== China ====
- The Liao Dynasty exchanges ambassadors with the Song Dynasty on New Years Day (Spring Festival).
- The city of Fuzhou, located in Fujian province, builds new city walls.

=== By topic ===
==== Religion ====
- Summer – Pope Benedict VI is imprisoned in the Castel Sant'Angelo at Rome, where he is strangled to death through the influence of the powerful Crescentii family. Crescentius I (the Elder), Italian politician and aristocrat, engineers an election and replaces Benedict with his own candidate Franco, who ascends under the title anti-Pope Boniface VII.
- Fall – Boniface VII is expelled by order of Otto II and flees to Constantinople, taking the Church treasury of the Vatican Basilica along with him. He is succeeded by Benedict VII as the 135th pope of the Catholic Church.
- An abbey is founded at the site of Mönchengladbach (Germany).

=== By place ===
==== Byzantine Empire ====
- Arab–Byzantine War: Emperor John I raids Mesopotamia and invades Syria, using the Byzantine base at Antioch to press southwards to Tripoli. He conquers the cities of Baalbek, Damascus, Sidon, Tiberias and Caesarea, but fails to take Jerusalem.

==== Europe ====
- October 15 – Oberto I (Obizzo), an Italian count palatine, dies. The Marca Obertenga (Eastern Liguria) is divided among the Obertenghi family.
- Emperor Otto II (the Red) leads a punitive expedition against Boleslaus II, duke of Bohemia (approximate date).

==== England ====
- July 8 – King Edgar I (the Peaceful) dies at Winchester after a 16-year reign. He is succeeded by his 12-year-old son Edward the Martyr as ruler of England.

==== Africa ====
- December 21 – Caliph Al-Mu'izz dies in Egypt after a 22-year reign in which he has extended his realm from Sicily to the Atlantic. He is succeeded by his son Al-Aziz Billah as ruler of the Fatimid Caliphate.

==== China ====
- Emperor Taizu conquers Hunan Province and brings the power of the military under Song control. Ending the era of the warlords (approximate date).

=== By topic ===
==== Religion ====
- March – Otto II appoints his archchancellor Willigis as archbishop of Mainz. He receives the pallium from Pope Benedict VII.

=== By place ===
==== Byzantine Empire ====
- January 10 – Emperor John I Tzimiskes dies at Constantinople, after returning from a second campaign against the Abbasids in Syria. He is buried in the Church of Christ Chalkites, and succeeded by his 18-year-old nephew Basil II, who becomes sole ruler of the Byzantine Empire. The administration remains in the hands of Basil Lekapenos (an illegitimate son of the late Emperor Romanos I).

==== Europe ====
- June – Emir Abu'l-Qasim launches a raiding expedition into Byzantine Italy from Sicily. He imposes a tribute on the cities of Cosenza and Cellere. Meanwhile, a Fatimid fleet assaults the Apulian coast and raids the surrounding countryside. Abu'l-Qasim sends an army to Otranto and besieges Gravina, before returning to Sicily – bringing home hundreds of captives and slaves.
- July – Emperor Otto II (the Red) occupies Regensburg, forcing his rebellious cousin Henry II (the Wrangler) (who claims rulership over the Holy Roman Empire) to flee to Bohemia. Henry is deposed and Bavaria is handed over to Otto I of Swabia (a grandson of the late Emperor Otto I). He sets up the new "Grand Duchy of Carinthia" covering modern-day Austria.
- Summer – Otto II appoints Leopold I (the Illustrious), a member of the House of Babenberg, as margrave of the Marcha Orientalis (the later Archduchy of Austria). In order to maintain his possession in Southern Italy, Otto strengthens his army with 2,100 mailed horsemen (heavy cavalry) from Germany, of which around 1,500 are to be provided by the Churches.
- Summer – Pietro IV Candiano, doge of Venice, demands Venetian assistance to put down a revolt in his personal fiefs around Ferrara. The Venetians also revolt against Candiano and assault the doge's palace. Repelled by mercenary forces, they burn the neighborhood – bringing the palace down with it. Candiano and his family escape, but are killed by the mob.
- October 16 – Caliph Al-Hakam II dies after a 15-year reign in which he has ended the Fatimid Caliphate in Morocco and made the University of Córdoba the greatest institution in the world. Al-Hakam is succeeded by his 10-year-old son Hisham II as ruler of the Caliphate of Córdoba. His widow Subh becomes regent together with Almanzor the de facto rulers.

==== China ====
- November 14 – Emperor Taizu (Zhao Kuangyin) dies at Kaifeng after a 16-year reign. He is succeeded by his brother Tai Zong as ruler of the Song Dynasty. During his rule the Yuelu Academy (located in Hunan Province) is founded, which becomes one of the renowned academies (Shūyuàn).
- Zhang Sixun, a Chinese astronomer and engineer, employs the use of liquid mercury, in order that the escapement mechanism of his astronomical clock can function, and metal parts will not rust by using hydraulics (water), or freeze in winter.

=== By place ===
==== Europe ====
- May – Boris II, dethroned emperor (tsar) of Bulgaria, and his brother Roman manage to escape from captivity in Constantinople. They reach the Bulgarian border, but Boris is killed by mistake by the border guards. Roman is crowned as new ruler, although leadership and the control of the army remain in the hands of General Samuel (a member of the Cometopuli Dynasty).
- War of the Three Henries: Henry III (the Younger), duke of Carinthia, gets involved in a conflict over the Patriarchate of Aquileia (March of Verona) in northeastern Italy. Emperor Otto II (the Red) decides in Aquileia's favor, prompting Henry III to go into revolt. He joins forces with Henry II (the Wrangler), duke of Bavaria. They are both joined by Henry I, bishop of Augsburg.
- August – Otto II appoints his cousin Charles, illegitimate son of the late King Louis IV (d'Outremer), as duke of Lorraine. King Lothair III – who claims the duchy as his own territory – declares war to the Holy Roman Empire. He leads an expedition into Lorraine accompanied by Hugh Capet. Lothair crosses the Meuse River and takes Aachen, sacking the imperial palace.
- Fall – Otto II invades the West Frankish Kingdom accompanied by Charles and ravages the cities of Reims, Soissons (where he halts at the Abbey of Saint Médard for devotions) and Laon. Lothair III escapes and flees to Paris, where he is besieged by imperial forces. Charles is proclaimed 'King of the Franks' by Dietrich I, bishop of Metz, at Laon.
- November 30 – Otto II is unable to take Paris, he lifts the siege of the capital and withdraws. A Frankish army under Lothair III pursues and defeats the imperial rearguard while crossing the Aisne River. Otto escapes and is forced to take refuge at Aachen with Charles, after his supplies are destroyed.

==== Scotland ====
- King Kenneth II of Scotland kills his rival Amlaíb mac Illuilb (or Amlaíb), brother of the late King Cuilén, to establish himself as Cuilén's successor.

==== Arabian Empire ====
- Spring – Sabuktigin, a Samanid general, succeeds his father-in-law Alp-Tegin as governor of Ghazna (modern Afghanistan). He enlarges his dominions and founds the Ghaznavid Dynasty.
- Summer – 'Adud al-Dawla, ruler (shah) of the Buyid Dynasty, drives the Hamdanids out of Mosul and tries to unify the country. Abu Taghlib is forced to flee to the Byzantine city of Antzitene.
- Emir Sa'd al-Dawla recovers his capital, Aleppo, from the ghulam Bakjur, who receives the governorship of Homs as compensation.

=== By topic ===
==== Religion ====
- Æthelwold, bishop of Winchester, rebuilds the western end of the Old Minster, with twin towers and no apses (approximate date).
- The Imam Ali Mosque, located in Najaf (modern Iraq), is completed by 'Adud al-Dawla.

=== By place ===
==== Byzantine Empire ====
- Battle of Pankaleia: Rebel forces under General Bardas Skleros are defeated by the Byzantine army loyal to Emperor Basil II, commanded by General Bardas Phokas (the Younger), near Pankaleia (modern-day Hisarköy). Phokas regroups his forces and continues his march to the East, drawing Skleros away from Constantinople.

==== Europe ====
- War of the Three Henries: Emperor Otto II (the Red) supported by his nephew Otto I, duke of Bavaria and Carinthia, attacks Passau, where the rebels have assembled. In September, the town surrenders due to Otto's siege tactics, which includes a bridge of boats. Ending of the revolt of Henry II (the Wrangler) against Otto II.
- Otto II has the three insurrectionists punished at Magdeburg. Henry II is stripped of all his possessions and imprisoned in the custody of Bishop Folcmar of Utrecht. The other two: Henry III (the Younger) loses his duchy to Otto I and Henry I, bishop of Augsburg, is arrested and imprisoned in Werden Abbey (Germany).
- Franco-German war of 978–980 begins.
- Almanzor, a court official and regent of Córdoba, becomes a chamberlain (hajib) and seizes power from the 13-year-old Caliph Hisham II. During his reign, Almanzor will exercise strong influence over Subh (the mother of Hisham) and wages successful campaigns against the Christian kingdoms in Northern Spain.
- Fall – Mieszko I, duke and prince (de facto ruler) of Poland, abducts Oda of Haldensleben from the monastery of Kalbe (Saxony-Anhalt) and marries her. She becomes Mieszko's second wife and Duchess of the Polans.
- Pandulf I (Ironhead), a Lombard prince, annexes the Principality of Salerno into his domains. For the first time, the Lombard duchies of Benevento, Capua, Salerno and Spoleto-Camerino are united under one ruler.
- Pietro I Orseolo, doge of Venice, escapes from Venice and travels to the Benedictine abbey of Michel-de-Cuxa (Southern France). He is succeeded by Vitale Candiano (not the bishop of Grado) as doge of Venice.
- Winter – Vladimir I (the Great), grand prince of Kiev, returns from Norway with a Varangian mercenary army and re-captures Novgorod. On his way to Kiev, he marches against the forces of his brother Yaropolk I.

==== England ====
- March 18 – King Edward the Martyr is murdered at Corfe Castle (Dorsetshire) upon the orders of his step-mother Ælfthryth (or Elfrida). He is succeeded by his half-brother Æthelred II (the Unready) who becomes king of England. During his reign Æthelred tries to keep his realm from being overrun by Danish Viking invaders.
- English troops are deployed on the Llŷn Peninsula on behalf of King Hywel of Gwynedd in order to prevent his uncle, King Iago, invading with Viking allies from Dublin.
- The town of Guildford (Surrey) becomes the location of the Royal Mint.

==== China ====
- June 3 – Chen Hongjin, Jiedushi of Pinghai Circuit, surrenders his territories and pledges allegiance to the Song Dynasty.
- June 9 – King Qian Chu surrenders his territories and pledges allegiance to the Song Dynasty, saving his people from war and economic destruction. Qian Chu remains ruler and moves 3,000 members of his household to Bianjing (modern-day Kaifeng). Wuyue is absorbed into the Song Dynasty, effectively ending the kingdom.

=== By topic ===
==== Literature ====
- One of the Four Great Books of Song, the Taiping Guangji, a Chinese collection of deities, fairies, ghost stories and theology, is completed. The collection is divided into 500 volumes and consists of about 3 million Chinese characters.

==== Religion ====
- The Badia Fiorentina, a Benedictine abbey in Florence, is founded by Willa of Tuscany, the widow of Hubert of Tuscany.

=== By place ===
==== Byzantine Empire ====
- March 24 – Second Battle of Pankaleia: An Ibero-Byzantine expeditionary force, under General Bardas Phokas (the Younger), inflicts a crushing defeat on the rebels of General Bardas Skleros, at Sarvenis (modern Turkey). Skleros manages to escape, and finds shelter with his Muslim allies. The rebellion is subdued without difficulty.

==== Europe ====
- Vitale Candiano, doge of Venice, abdicates for health reasons after a 14-month reign, and retires to a monastery. He is succeeded by Tribuno Memmo, a son-in-law of the murdered Pietro IV Candiano. Tribuno declares a general amnesty for everyone complicit in the plot against Pietro.
- June 8 – Louis V, nicknamed le Fainéant (the Do-Nothing), is crowned as the co-emperor of West Francia at Paris by his father, King Lothair. Upon Lothair's death on March 2, 986, Louis becomes the sole ruler.
- The city of Brussels is founded by Charles, duke of Lower Lorraine. He constructs fortifications (a castrum on an island) on the Senne River (modern Belgium).

==== Britain ====
- Tynwald (or Tynwald Court), the parliament of the Isle of Man, is founded. It remains active as the longest continuous parliament in the world.

==== Africa ====
- Jawhar as-Siqilli is dismissed as vizier of Egypt after an unsuccessful campaign in Syria (near Damascus). He is replaced by Ya'qub ibn Killis.

==== China ====
- Battle of Gaoliang River: Emperor Tai Zong leads an expedition into You Prefecture (or Youzhou). The Liao Dynasty counter-attacks and defeats the Song forces near modern-day Beijing.
- Summer – Tai Zong invades the Northern Han and besieges the capital of Taiyuan. A relief force sent by the Liao Dynasty is defeated. The Kingdom is absorbed into the Song Dynasty.

== Significant people ==
- Mar Abdisho I, Patriarch of the Assyrian Church of the East, held position 963–986
- Eric the Red (950–1003), Norse Explorer
- Richard I of Normandy (933–996), Duke of Normandy, r. 942–996
- Mieszko I (945?–992), Duke of Poland, r. c.960–992
- Vladimir of Kiev (958-1015), Kievan Prince and future Grand Prince of Kievan Rus
- Hisham II caliph of Córdoba
- Al-Aziz Billah Fatimid caliph of Cairo
- Al-Muti caliph of Baghdad
- At-Ta'i caliph of Baghdad

== Births ==
970

- Adelaide, German abbess and saint (d. 1015)
- Al-Sharif al-Radi, Persian Shi'ite scholar and poet (d. 1015)
- Bartholomew of Grottaferrata, Italian abbot (d. 1055)
- Constantine III, king of Scotland (approximate date)
- Fulk III (the Black), French nobleman (d. 1040)
- Gerberga, German noblewoman (approximate date)
- Hedwig, French noblewoman (approximate date)
- Henry of Schweinfurt, German nobleman (d. 1017)
- Henry of Speyer, German nobleman (approximate date)
- Heribert, archbishop of Cologne (approximate date)
- Leif Erikson, Norse Viking explorer (approximate date)
- Otto II, duke of Lower Lorraine (approximate date)
- Procopius of Sázava, Czech hermit and abbot (d. 1053)
- Radim Gaudentius, Polish archbishop (approximate date)
- Richard of Verdun, French abbot (d. 1046)
- Rudolph III, king of Burgundy (approximate date)
- Sergius IV, pope of the Catholic Church (d. 1012)
- Sitt al-Mulk, Fatimid princess and regent (d. 1023)
- Wifred II, Spanish nobleman (approximate date)
- William III, French nobleman (approximate date)
- Xu Daoning, Chinese painter (approximate date)

971

- Kushyar Gilani, Persian mathematician and geographer (d. 1029)
- Mahmud of Ghazni, emir of the Ghaznavid Empire (d. 1030)
- Oliba, Spanish count and bishop (approximate date)
- Rajendra Chola, Emperor of Chola Dynasty at its peak

972

- January 16 – Sheng Zong, emperor of the Liao Dynasty (d. 1031)
- March 27 – Robert II (the Pious), king of France (d. 1031)
- Abdussamed Babek, Kurdish ulama, author and poet (d. 1019/1020)
- Al-Mawardi, Abbasid jurist and diplomat (d. 1058)
- Ermesinde, countess and regent of Barcelona (d. 1058)
- Fujiwara no Seishi, Japanese empress consort (d. 1025)
- Fujiwara no Yukinari, Japanese calligrapher (d. 1027)
- Gregory V, pope of the Catholic Church (d. 999)
- Ramon Borrell, count of Barcelona (d. 1017)

973

- May 6 – Henry II, emperor of the Holy Roman Empire (d. 1024)
- September 4 – Al-Biruni, Persian physician and polymath (d. 1048)
- Adelaide I, German princess and abbess (approximate date)
- Abul 'Ala Al-Ma'arri, Syrian philosopher and poet (d. 1057)
- Hisham III, Umayyad caliph of Córdoba (d. 1036)
- Murasaki Shikibu, Japanese poet and lady-in-waiting (or 978)
- Qadi 'Abd al-Wahhab, Abbasid scholar and jurist (d. 1031)

974

- Bruno of Querfurt, German missionary bishop (d. 1009)
- Ermengol I, count of Urgell (d. 1010)
- Frederick, count of Walbeck (d. 1018)
- Fujiwara no Korechika, Japanese nobleman (d. 1010)
- Lý Thái Tổ, emperor of Lý dynasty (d. 1028)

975

- July 25 – Thietmar, bishop of Merseburg (d. 1018)
- Adalbold II, bishop of Utrecht (d. 1026)
- Amadeus I, count of Savoy (approximate date)
- Bouchard II, French nobleman (d. 1020)
- Conrad I, German nobleman (d. 1011)
- Cunigunde, Holy Roman Empress (d. 1040)
- Elijah, bishop of Beth Nuhadra (d. 1046)
- Gerard I, bishop of Cambrai (approximate date)
- Gero II, German nobleman (d. 1015)
- Guo, empress of the Song Dynasty (d. 1007)
- Hugh of Chalon, French bishop (approximate date)
- Izumi Shikibu, Japanese poet (approximate date)
- Oldřich, duke of Bohemia (approximate date)
- Sophia I, German princess and abbess (d. 1039)
- Stephen I, king of Hungary (approximate date)

976

- February 5 – Sanjō, emperor of Japan (d. 1017)
- Izumi Shikibu, Japanese poet (approximate date)

977

- March 4 – Al-Musabbihi, Fatimid historian (d. 1030)
- Fujiwara no Teishi, Japanese empress consort (d. 1001)
- Kōkei, Japanese Buddhist monk (approximate date)
- Poppo, abbot of Stavelot-Malmedy (d. 1048)

978

- Berno of Reichenau, German abbot (approximate date)
- Elvira of Castile, queen consort of León (approximate date)
- Ibn 'Abd al-Barr, Moorish judge and scholar (d. 1071)
- Murasaki Shikibu, Japanese poet and lady-in-waiting (or 973)
- Wang Zeng, Chinese grand chancellor (approximate date)
- Yaroslav I (the Wise), Russian grand prince (d. 1054)
- Zoë, Byzantine empress consort (approximate date)

979

- August 29 – Otto (or Eudes), French nobleman (d. 1045)
- Al-Muqtana Baha'uddin, Druze religious leader (d. 1043)
- Estrid (or Astrid), queen consort of Sweden (d. 1035)
- Fujiwara no Takaie, Japanese nobleman (d. 1044)
- Ibn al-Samh, Andalusian astronomer (d. 1035)
- Matilda, countess palatine of Lotharingia (d. 1025)

== Deaths ==
970

- January 18 – Hatto II, archbishop of Mainz
- January 30 – Peter I, emperor of Bulgaria
- February 5 – Polyeuctus, patriarch of Constantinople
- February 22 – García I, king of Pamplona
- June 15 – Adalbert, bishop of Passau
- August 31 – Han Xizai, Chinese official (b. 902)
- November 1 – Boso, bishop of Merseburg
- Abu'l-Fadl ibn al-'Amid, Persian statesman
- Al-Qassab, Abbasid warrior-scholar
- Beinir Sigmundsson, Viking chieftain
- Brestir Sigmundsson, Viking chieftain
- Erenfried II, Frankish nobleman (approximate date)
- Fernán González, Frankish count of Castile
- Fujiwara no Saneyori, Japanese statesman (b. 900)
- Harald II (Greycloak), king of Norway
- Hasdai ibn Shaprut, Jewish diplomat (approximate date)
- Menahem ben Saruq, Jewish philologist (approximate date)
- Minamoto no Saneakira, Japanese nobleman (b. 910)
- Oswulf, bishop of Ramsbury (approximate date)
- Taksony, Grand Prince of Hungary (approximate date)
- Willa of Tuscany, queen consort of Italy

971

- Aditya Chola II, prince and ruler of the Chola dynasty (India)
- Abū Ja'far al-Khāzin, Persian astronomer (b. 900)
- Anemas, Byzantine (Muslim) army commander
- Atto, bishop of Vic (Spain) (approximate date)
- Cuilén (or Cuilean), king of Alba (Scotland)
- Eraclus (or Evraclus), bishop of Liège
- Ja'far ibn Fallah, Fatimid general and governor
- Kalokyros, Byzantine patrician and pretender
- Li Jingda, prince of Southern Tang (b. 924)
- Muhammad al-Khushani, Umayyad historian
- Muhammad ibn Rumahis, Umayyad admiral
- Ordgar, English ealdorman and advisor
- Qian Hongzong, king of Wuyue (approximate date)
- Ziri ibn Manad, founder of the Zirid dynasty

972

- September 6 – John XIII, pope of the Catholic Church
- December 18 (or 973) – Eberhard IV, Frankish nobleman (or 973)
- Ælfwold I (or Ælfweald), bishop of Crediton
- Arnulf II, count of Boulogne (approximate date)
- Boleslaus I (the Cruel), duke of Bohemia (or 967)
- Feng Yanlu, Chinese official (approximate date)
- Fujiwara no Koretada, Japanese statesman (b. 924)
- Pope John XIII
- Khottiga Amoghavarsha, ruler of the Rashtrakuta Empire
- Kūya, Japanese priest of Pure Land Buddhism (b. 903)
- Liutprand, Lombard bishop and historian
- Sviatoslav I (Igorevich), Grand Prince of Kiev

973

- January 14 – Ekkehard I, Frankish monk and poet
- March 26 – Guntram (the Rich), Frankish nobleman
- March 27 – Hermann Billung, Frankish nobleman
- May 7 – Otto I, emperor of the Holy Roman Empire (b. 912)
- May 15 – Byrhthelm, bishop of Wells (Somerset)
- July 4 – Ulrich (or Oldarici), bishop of Augsburg (b. 893)
- July 19 – Kyunyeo, Korean monk and poet (b. 917)
- September 12 – Nefingus, bishop of Angers
- November 12 – Burchard III, Frankish nobleman
- December 18 (or 972) – Eberhard IV, Frankish nobleman (or 972)
- Abu'l-Abbas Ismail, Abbasid official and statesman
- Cathal mac Tadg, king of Connacht (Ireland)
- Conchobar mac Tadg, king of Connacht
- Geibennach mac Aedha, king of Uí Maine (Ireland)
- Guo Zongxun, emperor of Later Zhou (d. 953)
- Hrotsvitha, German canoness and poet (approximate date)
- Jawdhar, Fatimid general and chief minister
- Karka II, ruler of the Rashtrakuta Empire (India)
- Melias, Byzantine general (approximate date)
- Reginar III, Frankish nobleman (approximate date)
- Richar (or Richer), Frankish nobleman
- Werner (or Warin), Frankish nobleman

974

- March 7 – John of Gorze, Frankish abbot and diplomat
- October 12 – Al-Muti, caliph of the Abbasid Caliphate (b. 914)
- Al-Qadi al-Nu'man, Fatimid jurist and historian
- Benedict VI, pope of the Catholic Church
- Fujiwara no Yoshitaka, Japanese waka poet (b. 954)
- Muhammad Bal'ami, Persian historian and vizier
- Ratherius (or Rathier), bishop of Verona
- Shi Chonggui, emperor of Later Jin (b. 914)

975

- June 28
  - Cyneweard, bishop of Wells (Somerset)
  - Thurcytel, abbot of Crowland (approximate date)
- July 4 – Gwangjong (Wang So), Korean king (b. 925)
- July 8 – Edgar I (the Peaceful), king of England
- July 31 – Fu Yanqing, Chinese general (b. 898)
- October 15 – Oberto I, Italian count palatine
- November 12 – Notker Physicus, Swiss painter
- November 26 – Conrad, bishop of Constance
- December 21 – Al-Mu'izz, Fatimid caliph (b. 932)
- December 27 – Balderic, bishop of Utrecht (b. 897)
- Bilgetegin, Samanid officer and governor
- Cináed ua hArtacáin, Irish Gaelic poet
- Dyfnwal ab Owain, king of Strathclyde
- Gu Hongzhong, Chinese painter (b. 937)
- Master Geng, Chinese alchemist
- Olof II, king of Sweden (approximate date)
- Theobald I, Frankish nobleman (b. 913)
- Wynsige (or Wynsy), bishop of Lichfield
- Yongming Yanshou, Chinese Zen master (b. 904)

976

- January 10 – John I Tzimiskes, Byzantine emperor
- May 11 – Henry I (the Bald), German nobleman
- June 13 – Mansur I, emir of the Samanid Empire
- June 14
  - Aron, Bulgarian nobleman
  - David, Bulgarian nobleman
  - Moses, Bulgarian nobleman
- June 29 – Gero, archbishop of Cologne
- October 8 – Helen of Zadar, queen of Croatia
- October 16 – Al-Hakam II, Umayyad caliph (b. 915)
- November 14 – Taizu, Chinese emperor (b. 927)
- Al-Mansur Yahya, Zaidi scholar and imam
- Isarn, bishop of Grenoble (approximate date)
- Kvirike II, Georgian prince and chorbishop
- Madame Huarui, Chinese concubine and poet
- Mathgamain mac Cennétig, king of Munster
- Pietro IV Candiano, doge of Venice
- Rukn al-Dawla, Buyid general and emir
- Sun Taizhen, queen of Wuyue (Ten Kingdoms)
- Theodoric I, German nobleman (approximate date)
- Ali ibn Muhammad al-Iyadi, Arabic poet.
- Phạm Thị Trân, Vietnamese opera singer and Mandarin (b. 926)

977

- March 1 – Rudesind, Galician bishop (b. 907)
- November 8 – Ibn al-Qūṭiyya, Andalusian historian
- December 20 – Fujiwara no Kanemichi, Japanese statesman (b. 925)
- Amlaíb mac Illuilb, king of Alba (Scotland)
- Ashot III (the Merciful), king of Armenia
- Bisutun, ruler of the Ziyarid Dynasty
- Boris II, emperor of the Bulgarian Empire
- Dobrawa, duchess consort of the Polans
- Gisulf I, prince of Salerno (approximate date)
- Guo Zhongshu, Chinese painter and calligrapher
- Ivar of Limerick, Norse Viking king
- Kamo no Yasunori, Japanese spiritual advisor (b. 917)
- Oleg, prince of the Drevlyans
- Peter, Byzantine eunuch general
- Sideman, bishop of Crediton

978

- February 9 – Luitgarde, duchess consort of Normandy
- February 22 – Lambert, count of Chalon (b. 930)
- March 18 – Edward the Martyr, king of the English
- May 18 – Frederick I, duke of Upper Lorraine
- August 15 – Li Yu, ruler ('king') of Southern Tang
- December 3 – Abraham, Coptic pope of Alexandria
- unknown date
  - Aboazar Lovesendes, Portuguese nobleman
  - Comhaltan Ua Clerigh, king of Hy Fiachrach (Ireland)
  - Fernando Ansúrez II, count of Monzón and Campos
  - Fernando Bermúdez, count of Cea (approximate date)
  - Ibn Hawqal, Muslim writer, geographer and chronicler (earliest likely date)
  - Geirmund the Noisy, Viking adventurer (approximate date)
  - Gyeongsun, king of Silla (Korea) (b. 896)
  - Ibn Hawqal, Muslim Arab geographer
  - Lashkari ibn Muhammad, Shaddadid emir
  - Máel Muad mac Brain, king of Munster (Ireland)
  - Rogvolod, prince of Polotsk (approximate date)
  - Yang Guangmei, Chinese general (approximate date)

979

- June 29 – Fujiwara no Koshi, Japanese empress (b. 947)
- August 3 – Thietmar, German nobleman
- August 11 – Gero, German nobleman
- August 26 – Zhao Dezhao, prince of the Song Dynasty (b. 951)
- August 29 – Abu Taghlib, Hamdanid emir
- September 19 – Gotofredo I, archbishop of Milan
- unknown dates
  - 'Imran ibn Shahin, Muslim ruler
  - Vitale Candiano, doge of Venice
  - Hasanwayh, Hasanwayhid ruler
- probable – Iago ab Idwal, king of Gwynedd
