= 978 =

Calendar year

978 in various calendars
- Gregorian calendar: 978; CMLXXVIII
- Ab urbe condita: 1731
- Armenian calendar: 427; ԹՎ ՆԻԷ
- Assyrian calendar: 5728
- Balinese saka calendar: 899–900
- Bengali calendar: 384–385
- Berber calendar: 1928
- Buddhist calendar: 1522
- Burmese calendar: 340
- Byzantine calendar: 6486–6487
- Chinese calendar: 丁丑年 (Fire Ox); 3675 or 3468 — to — 戊寅年 (Earth Tiger); 3676 or 3469
- Coptic calendar: 694–695
- Discordian calendar: 2144
- Ethiopian calendar: 970–971
- Hebrew calendar: 4738–4739
- Hindu calendars
- Vikram Samvat: 1034–1035
- Shaka Samvat: 899–900
- Kali Yuga: 4078–4079
- Holocene calendar: 10978
- Iranian calendar: 356–357
- Islamic calendar: 367–368
- Japanese calendar: Jōgen 3 / Tengen 1 (天元元年)
- Javanese calendar: 879–880
- Julian calendar: 978; CMLXXVIII
- Korean calendar: 3311
- Minguo calendar: 934 before ROC 民前934年
- Nanakshahi calendar: −490
- Seleucid era: 1289/1290 AG
- Thai solar calendar: 1520–1521
- Tibetan calendar: མེ་མོ་གླང་ལོ་ (female Fire-Ox); 1104 or 723 or −49 — to — ས་ཕོ་སྟག་ལོ་ (male Earth-Tiger); 1105 or 724 or −48

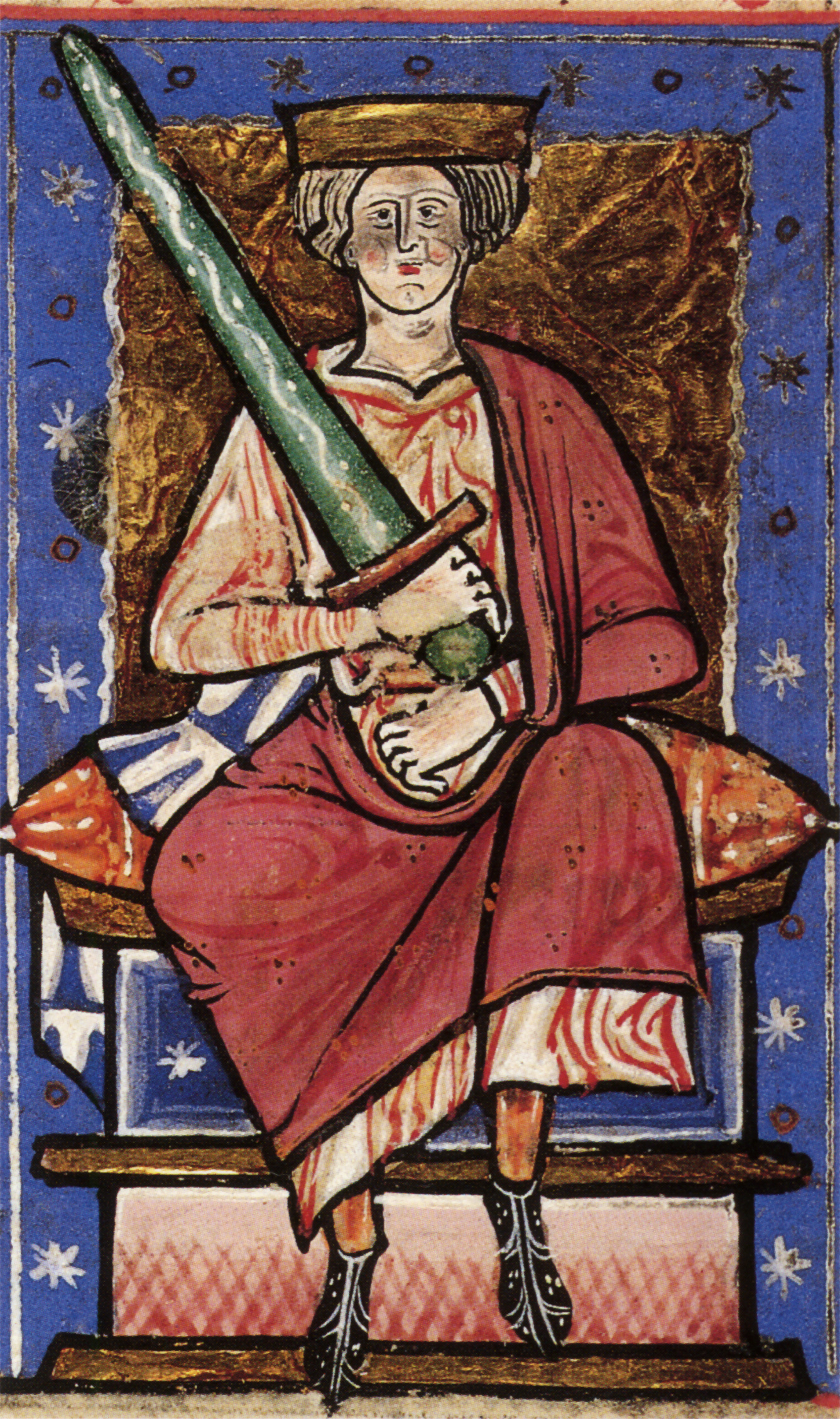
Æthelred II (the Unready) (c. 966–1016)

Year 978 (CMLXXVIII) was a common year starting on Tuesday of the Julian calendar.

== Events ==
=== By place ===
==== Byzantine Empire ====
- Battle of Pankaleia: Rebel forces under General Bardas Skleros are defeated by the Byzantine army loyal to Emperor Basil II, commanded by General Bardas Phokas (the Younger), near Pankaleia (modern-day Hisarköy). Phokas regroups his forces and continues his march to the East, drawing Skleros away from Constantinople.

==== Europe ====
- War of the Three Henries: Emperor Otto II (the Red) supported by his nephew Otto I, duke of Bavaria and Carinthia, attacks Passau, where the rebels have assembled. In September, the town surrenders due to Otto's siege tactics, which includes a bridge of boats. Ending of the revolt of Henry II (the Wrangler) against Otto II.
- Otto II has the three insurrectionists punished at Magdeburg. Henry II is stripped of all his possessions and imprisoned in the custody of Bishop Folcmar of Utrecht. The other two: Henry III (the Younger) loses his duchy to Otto I and Henry I, bishop of Augsburg, is arrested and imprisoned in Werden Abbey (Germany).
- Franco-German war of 978–980 begins.
- Almanzor, a court official and regent of Córdoba, becomes a chamberlain (hajib) and seizes power from the 13-year-old Caliph Hisham II. During his reign, Almanzor will exercise strong influence over Subh (the mother of Hisham) and wages successful campaigns against the Christian kingdoms in Northern Spain.
- Fall – Mieszko I, duke and prince (de facto ruler) of Poland, abducts Oda of Haldensleben from the monastery of Kalbe (Saxony-Anhalt) and marries her. She becomes Mieszko's second wife and Duchess of the Polans.
- Pandulf I (Ironhead), a Lombard prince, annexes the Principality of Salerno into his domains. For the first time, the Lombard duchies of Benevento, Capua, Salerno and Spoleto-Camerino are united under one ruler.
- Pietro I Orseolo, doge of Venice, escapes from Venice and travels to the Benedictine abbey of Michel-de-Cuxa (Southern France). He is succeeded by Vitale Candiano (not the bishop of Grado) as doge of Venice.
- Winter – Vladimir I (the Great), grand prince of Kiev, returns from Norway with a Varangian mercenary army and re-captures Novgorod. On his way to Kiev, he marches against the forces of his brother Yaropolk I.

==== England ====
- March 18 – King Edward the Martyr is murdered at Corfe Castle (Dorsetshire) upon the orders of his step-mother Ælfthryth (or Elfrida). He is succeeded by his half-brother Æthelred II (the Unready) who becomes king of England. During his reign Æthelred tries to keep his realm from being overrun by Danish Viking invaders.
- English troops are deployed on the Llŷn Peninsula on behalf of King Hywel of Gwynedd in order to prevent his uncle, King Iago, invading with Viking allies from Dublin.
- The town of Guildford (Surrey) becomes the location of the Royal Mint.

==== China ====
- June 3 – Chen Hongjin, Jiedushi of Pinghai Circuit, surrenders his territories and pledges allegiance to the Song Dynasty.
- June 9 – King Qian Chu surrenders his territories and pledges allegiance to the Song Dynasty, saving his people from war and economic destruction. Qian Chu remains ruler and moves 3,000 members of his household to Bianjing (modern-day Kaifeng). Wuyue is absorbed into the Song Dynasty, effectively ending the kingdom.

=== By topic ===
==== Literature ====
- One of the Four Great Books of Song, the Taiping Guangji, a Chinese collection of deities, fairies, ghost stories and theology, is completed. The collection is divided into 500 volumes and consists of about 3 million Chinese characters.

==== Religion ====
- The Badia Fiorentina, a Benedictine abbey in Florence, is founded by Willa of Tuscany, the widow of Hubert of Tuscany.

== Births ==
- Berno of Reichenau, German abbot (approximate date)
- Elvira of Castile, queen consort of León (approximate date)
- Ibn 'Abd al-Barr, Moorish judge and scholar (d. 1071)
- Murasaki Shikibu, Japanese poet and lady-in-waiting (or 973)
- Wang Zeng, Chinese grand chancellor (approximate date)
- Yaroslav I (the Wise), Russian grand prince (d. 1054)
- Zoë, Byzantine empress consort (approximate date)

== Deaths ==
- February 9 – Luitgarde, duchess consort of Normandy
- February 22 – Lambert, count of Chalon (b. 930)
- March 18 – Edward the Martyr, king of the English
- May 18 – Frederick I, duke of Upper Lorraine
- August 15 – Li Yu, ruler ('king') of Southern Tang
- December 3 – Abraham, Coptic pope of Alexandria
- unknown date
  - Aboazar Lovesendes, Portuguese nobleman
  - Comhaltan Ua Clerigh, king of Hy Fiachrach (Ireland)
  - Fernando Ansúrez II, count of Monzón and Campos
  - Fernando Bermúdez, count of Cea (approximate date)
  - Ibn Hawqal, Muslim writer, geographer and chronicler (earliest likely date)
  - Geirmund the Noisy, Viking adventurer (approximate date)
  - Gyeongsun, king of Silla (Korea) (b. 896)
  - Ibn Hawqal, Muslim Arab geographer
  - Lashkari ibn Muhammad, Shaddadid emir
  - Máel Muad mac Brain, king of Munster (Ireland)
  - Rogvolod, prince of Polotsk (approximate date)
  - Yang Guangmei, Chinese general (approximate date)
