= 973 =

Calendar year

973 in various calendars
- Gregorian calendar: 973; CMLXXIII
- Ab urbe condita: 1726
- Armenian calendar: 422; ԹՎ ՆԻԲ
- Assyrian calendar: 5723
- Balinese saka calendar: 894–895
- Bengali calendar: 379–380
- Berber calendar: 1923
- Buddhist calendar: 1517
- Burmese calendar: 335
- Byzantine calendar: 6481–6482
- Chinese calendar: 壬申年 (Water Monkey); 3670 or 3463 — to — 癸酉年 (Water Rooster); 3671 or 3464
- Coptic calendar: 689–690
- Discordian calendar: 2139
- Ethiopian calendar: 965–966
- Hebrew calendar: 4733–4734
- Hindu calendars
- Vikram Samvat: 1029–1030
- Shaka Samvat: 894–895
- Kali Yuga: 4073–4074
- Holocene calendar: 10973
- Iranian calendar: 351–352
- Islamic calendar: 362–363
- Japanese calendar: Tenroku 4 / Ten'en 1 (天延元年)
- Javanese calendar: 874–875
- Julian calendar: 973; CMLXXIII
- Korean calendar: 3306
- Minguo calendar: 939 before ROC 民前939年
- Nanakshahi calendar: −495
- Seleucid era: 1284/1285 AG
- Thai solar calendar: 1515–1516
- Tibetan calendar: ཆུ་ཕོ་སྤྲེ་ལོ་ (male Water-Monkey); 1099 or 718 or −54 — to — ཆུ་མོ་བྱ་ལོ་ (female Water-Bird); 1100 or 719 or −53

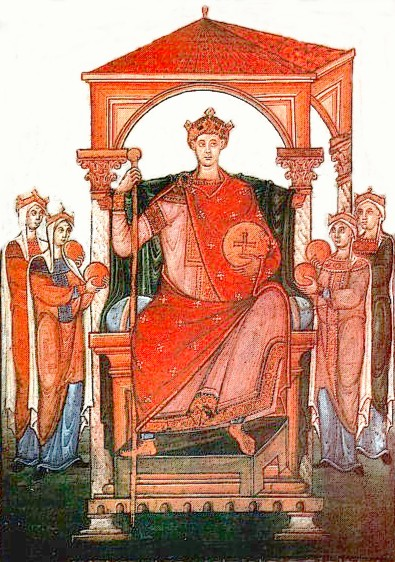
Otto II is crowned as Holy Roman Emperor.

Year 973 (CMLXXIII) was a common year starting on Wednesday of the Julian calendar.

== Events ==
=== By place ===
==== Byzantine Empire ====
- Spring – The Byzantine army, led by General Melias (Domestic of the Schools in the East), continues the operations in Upper Mesopotamia.
- July: Melias moves against Amida (modern Turkey). He defeats the Arabs outside the walls, and begins to lay siege to the city. After a few days, a violent wind and a thick dust spreads over the Byzantine camp. Covered by the dust, the Arabs attack and rout the Byzantines. Many of them are slaughtered and some, including Melias, are taken prisoner. Previous Byzantine gains in the area are lost. The wounded Melias dies later in captivity.

==== Europe ====
- May 7 – Emperor Otto I (the Great) dies at Memleben in Thuringia (modern Germany) after a 37-year reign. He is succeeded by his 18-year-old son Otto II (the Red), who becomes absolute ruler of the Holy Roman Empire. His mother Adelaide will exert great influence on Otto, although her lavish philanthropies will be a source of contention. Otto's succession leads to conflicts in the south German duchies and in Lotharingia.

==== Britain ====
- Edgar I (the Peaceful) is crowned king during a royal ceremony at Bath by Archbishop Dunstan. In a council at Chester, Lothian (a region of the Lowlands) is ceded to Scotland, in return for fealty from King Kenneth II.
- Edgar I marches with his army north to Chester. His navy meets him there via the Irish Sea. This show of strength persuades the 'Northern Kings' to submit to his overlordship (approximate date).

==== Africa ====
- Caliph Al-Mu'izz transfers the royal residence of the Fatimid Caliphate from El-Mansuriya (modern Tunisia) to the newly founded city of Cairo in Egypt. Egypt becomes the autonomous centre of the Fatimid Caliphate. He leaves general Buluggin ibn Ziri to govern the Western North African territories, which will become the province of Al-Maghreb (meaning the West).

=== By topic ===
==== Commerce ====
- Cloves, ginger, black pepper, and other Eastern spices are available for purchase in the marketplace at Mainz. The spices are brought to the city by Jewish traveling merchants, known as the Radhanites, who have contacts in the international trade between the Christian and Islamic world (approximate date).

==== Religion ====
- January 19 – Pope Benedict VI is consecrated as the 134th pope of the Catholic Church. He is installed at Rome with the approval of Otto I and becomes a puppet ruler of the Holy Roman Empire. The Roman aristocracy resents Otto's dominance in Roman civil and ecclesiastical affairs.
- In the Council of Winchester, Edgar I accepts a 'Monastic Agreement' (called the Regularis Concordia). The document is compiled by Bishop Æthelwold and serves as a rule for how monastic life should be performed.

== Births ==
- May 6 – Henry II, emperor of the Holy Roman Empire (d. 1024)
- September 4 – Al-Biruni, Persian physician and polymath (d. 1048)
- Adelaide I, German princess and abbess (approximate date)
- Abul 'Ala Al-Ma'arri, Syrian philosopher and poet (d. 1057)
- Hisham III, Umayyad caliph of Córdoba (d. 1036)
- Murasaki Shikibu, Japanese poet and lady-in-waiting (or 978)
- Qadi 'Abd al-Wahhab, Abbasid scholar and jurist (d. 1031)

== Deaths ==
- January 14 – Ekkehard I, Frankish monk and poet
- March 26 – Guntram (the Rich), Frankish nobleman
- March 27 – Hermann Billung, Frankish nobleman
- May 7 – Otto I, emperor of the Holy Roman Empire (b. 912)
- May 15 – Byrhthelm, bishop of Wells (Somerset)
- July 4 – Ulrich (or Oldarici), bishop of Augsburg (b. 893)
- July 19 – Kyunyeo, Korean monk and poet (b. 917)
- September 12 – Nefingus, bishop of Angers
- November 12 – Burchard III, Frankish nobleman
- December 18 (or 972) – Eberhard IV, Frankish nobleman (or 972)
- Abu'l-Abbas Ismail, Abbasid official and statesman
- Cathal mac Tadg, king of Connacht (Ireland)
- Conchobar mac Tadg, king of Connacht
- Geibennach mac Aedha, king of Uí Maine (Ireland)
- Guo Zongxun, emperor of Later Zhou (d. 953)
- Hrotsvitha, German canoness and poet (approximate date)
- Jawdhar, Fatimid general and chief minister
- Karka II, ruler of the Rashtrakuta Empire (India)
- Melias, Byzantine general (approximate date)
- Reginar III, Frankish nobleman (approximate date)
- Richar (or Richer), Frankish nobleman
- Werner (or Warin), Frankish nobleman
