= Tejerina =

Coordinates: 42°55′N 5°00′W

Tejerina, Spain
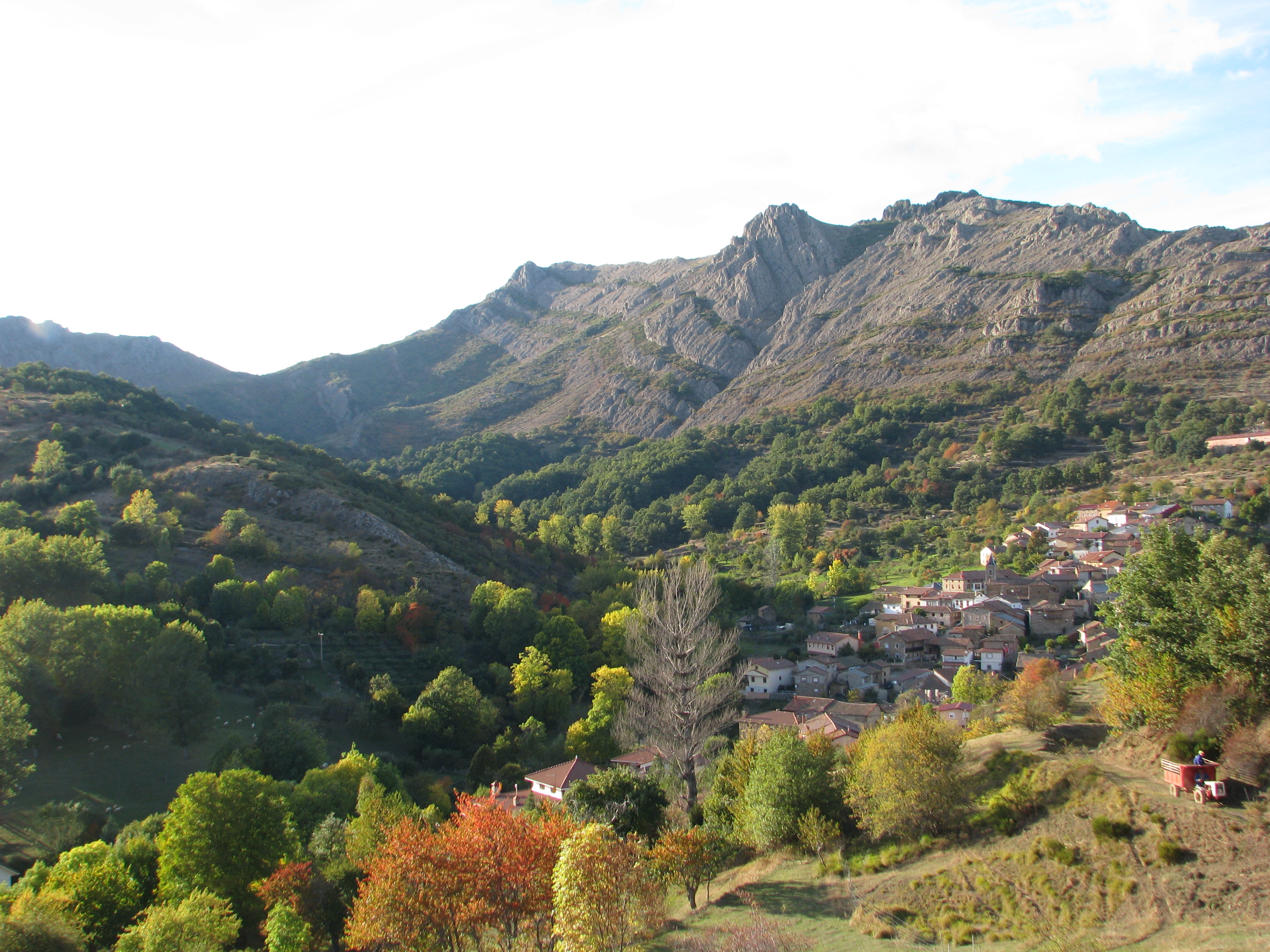

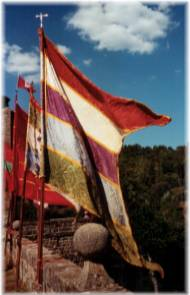
- Flag
- Interactive map of Tejerina, Spain
- Country: Spain
- Autonomous community: Castile and León
- Province: León
- Municipality: Prioro

Area
  - Total: 49 km^{2} (19 sq mi)
- Elevation: 1.200 m (3.94 ft)

Population (2004)
  - Total: 437
  - Density: 8.9/km^{2} (23/sq mi)
- Time zone: UTC+1 (CET)
  - Summer (DST): UTC+2 (CEST)
- Website: Prioro municipal website

Tejerina is a village situated in the north of Spain, which belongs to the León province and to the Prioro municipality, which also forms part of the Riaño shire.

== Location ==
This village is surrounded by territories belonging to the neighbouring villages such as Remolina, Horcadas, Prioro and Mental, a cattle house which in the older times used to be a village.

Soon before arriving to the place, there is a little church called La ermita de Retejerina (The Chapel of Retejerina) by its inhabitants. This church is the annual host place of the festivities in honor to the Virgin of Retejerina, the patroness of the village, which are celebrated every weekend after August 15. It is said that this little religious building used to be part of a very big monastery. The virgin of Retejerina is deeply adorated by its inhabitants because they consider that always has answered their prayers.

The ground of the village is the source of the Tejerina creek, which flows into Cea river, inside Prioro. That river flows into the provinces of León, Valladolid and Zamora, being an affluent of the Esla River.

Although Tejerina is a very little village, there are many people living there in the summer months; specially in August, when people use to go there in order to spend their summer holidays.

Some years ago, was built a private propriety rural house, which is rented by tourists who want to know more about the local culture and the numerous landscapes. Tejerina forms part of the national park of Picos de Europa, known in the whole Spain by its high ecological importance. In fact, the village is known by its high mountains that are usually visited, such as Piedra del agua (Waterstone) and El pico de las palabras (The peak of words), which is the highest of the region (About 1800 meters high).

== Nature ==
The most interesting physical elements of the village are the mountains that surround the village apart from other interesting natural formations such as Peña Horacada: a rock with a big hole, and El gorgolón, which is a waterfall located next to the old light factory which is now restored.

The nature of the village is formed by domestic animals such as sheep, hens, pigs, and formerly, caws (Since the 1990s, there are not caws anymore in Tejerina).

Due to its location inside the Picos de Europa national park, the place has got a booming wildlife. Animals like foxes, boars, roe deer, owls, eagles and brown bears are common in the surroundings of the village and much appreciated by the nature lovers, who used to go there to see those animals. Some of these animals enter sometimes inside the village and can be seen by the local people.

== Culture ==
The local culture of Tejerina is deeply rooted in the transhumance and the cattle farming, which has been the way of life of many of their inhabitants for many years. This old way of living is present in the popular culture and has been transmitted by various forms. For example, in songs.

Every Saturday nights, is celebrated "La ronda" (The round), which consists in singing traditional songs in front of every house of the village. The round used to be celebrated ages ago, and still is celebrated. Some of the traditional songs from the village are sung and known not only in the wole region, but also in some places in the rest of Spain. These songs were collected and released in a book called "Aires de la mi montaña" (The air of my mountains) in 1997, being also recorded and released in tape format.

The most important festivity of the village takes place on June 29, the Saint Peter's day. Two months later, it's celebrated the day of the virgin of Retejerina. That day, the virgin is carried from the chapel to the main church of the village in a parade that is followed by all the inhabitants.

Both festivities are organised by the round association.

== Early history ==
The first information about Tejerina comes from the Middle Ages, specifically from the 11th century. Most of these documents are deeds of sale, lease and donations.

The first document, where the name of the village appears, belongs to the monastery of Sahagun. In it, it is related how a priest from the village donates to the monastery of Sahagun the inheritance received from his elders in Tejerina, which was composed by seven lands in seven other places.

The rest of the places where the village is mentioned mostly belong to the monastery of Gradefes. In one of these documents, the whole village, along with other possessions, is given as a dowry to Teresa Peláyz, by Gonzalo Alonso, a feudal lord from the zone.

== Notable people ==
- Fidel Villarroel – historian born in Tejerina
- Balbino Villarroel – canonized priest who died in the Spanish Civil War.

== Related bibliography ==
Many authors have made mentioned this village in their books and some have even based their creations exclusively in it.

- Fidel Villarroel: Essay about the Tejerinese vocabulary, in the Dialectology and popular traditions magazine, released on January 31, 1975, where a compilation of words from the Astur Leonese dialect and exclusive variants of Tejerina are made,
- David Fernández Villarroel: Author of many books about the Spanish Language and Literature and of editions of books such as "El Lazarillo de Tormes", "The Treasure Planet" and "Anthology of Readings". However, this author is related to Tejerina by books such as Ver nevar (To watch the snow falling) and Años de guardar (Years to stay).
