= Fidel Villarroel =

Spanish historian, writer, filipinologist, biographer and political commentator

- Born: March 18, 1929; Tejerina, Spain
- Died: October 23, 2016 (aged 87); Manila, Philippines
- Education: University of Santo Tomas, University of London
- Occupations: Historian, Filipinologist, Biographer, Writer, Theologian
- Writing career
- Genre: Non-fiction
- Notable works: Positio Super Introductione Causae, or the cause of beatification and canonization of St. Lorenzo Ruiz and fifteen other Companions
- Notable awards: Pro Ecclesia et Pontifice, Cruz de Isabel la Catolica, Master of Sacred Theology of the Dominican Order
- Movements: Dominican Order, Order of Isabella the Catholic

Fidel Villarroel (18 March 1929 – 23 October 2016) was a Spanish historian, writer, filipinologist, biographer, political commentator, Master Theologian of the Dominican Order, and member of the Order of Isabella the Catholic. A recipient of the Pro Ecclesia et Pontifice, he is the former Archivist, Spanish Department Director, Prefect of Libraries, and professor at the Pontifical and Royal University of Santo Tomas. He had also served as secretary to the Apostolic Nunciature for 32 years(1959–1991), and academic director of the prestigious Academia Filipina de la Lengua Española (Philippine Academy of the Spanish Language), the local branch of the renowned Real Academia Española based in Madrid, Spain, and part of the Asociación de Academias de la Lengua Española (Association of Spanish Language Academies).

He is also known as the most-prolific saint-maker in the Philippines for his Positio Super Introductione Causae, or historical research, that he made for the beatification and canonization of Lorenzo Ruiz and fifteen other companion-martyrs.

== Early years ==
Villarroel was born and grew up in the town of Tejerina, in Leon, Spain. In highschool, he was inspired to become a priest by his teachers at the Dominican schools of La Mejorada and Santa Maria de Nieva. He then took up Philosophy and Theology at the House of Studies in the Convent of Avila, where he started his Dominican vocation. After his ordination in 1952, he pursued postgraduate studies in History at the University of London.

== Career ==
After receiving his master's degree, he went to the Philippines in 1957, devoting much time to the study of Philippine History. He held various administrative posts at the Pontifical and Royal University of Santo Tomas, serving as Head of the Spanish Department for 25 years, head of the University of Santo Tomas Archives for almost 50 years, Prefect of Libraries, and Professor of Church History in the Faculty of Sacred Theology. He earned his Doctorate in Sacred Theology from UST

In addition, Villarroel authored 23 books and 65 articles regarding Church history and Theology. He also authored the Positio Super Introductione Causae or cause of beatification leading to the canonization of San Lorenzo Ruiz and his companion martyrs. Moreover, Villarroel was involved in activities outside of the University, such as serving as the secretary to the Apostolic Nunciature for 32 years (1959–1991).

Before his death in 2016, Villarroel served as an academic director of the prestigious Academia Filipina de la Lengua Española (Philippine Academy of the Spanish Language), the local branch of the renowned Real Academia Española based in Madrid, Spain, and part of the Asociación de Academias de la Lengua Española (Association of Spanish Language Academies).

== Major awards ==
In 1984, he was given the Pro Ecclesia et Pontifice by Pope John Paul II. The Pro Ecclesia et Pontifice, also known as the Cross of Honour, is the highest medal that can be awarded to the laity by the Papacy. He also received the Cruz de Isabel la Catolica in 1985 from the Spanish government for his works which exemplified the relations between Spain and the international community, and the Catholic Authors Award by the Asian Catholic Publishers Inc. in 1991. He was also a recipient of the National Book Awards in 1999. In 2009, Villarroel was installed as Master of Sacred Theology, an honorary title once held by St. Dominic de Guzman, given by the Dominican Order to its most distinguished scholars. The S.T.M. has the perpetual right to the title very reverend.

== Publications ==
=== Books ===
Some of Villarroel's books

- Apolinario Mabini, his birth date and student years (1964)
- Father Jose Burgos, University Student (1971)
- Cruzada española en Vietnam: Compaña de Cochinchina. Introducción y edición de Fidel Villarroel, O.P. (1972)
- Contribucíon de la Universidad de Santa Tomás al desarrollo de la literatura hispanofilipina: Discurso (1974)
- Fray Jerónimo Román: Historia del Siglo de Oro (1974)
- El Padre Antonio Gonzalez, Martir (1981)
- Christian Witnessing: Martyrdom and Martyrs (1981)
- Jose Rizal and the University of Santo Tomas (1984)
- Lorenzo De Manila: The Protomartyr of the Philippines and His Companions (1987)
- Un siglo de apostolado(1887–1987) (1993)
- Marcelo H. Del Pilar, His Religious Conversions (1997)
- Marcelo H. Del Pilar at the University of Santo Tomas (1997)
- The Dominicans and the Philippine Revolution, 1896–1903 (1999)
- Miguel De Benavides, O.P., 1550–1605: Friar, Bishop, and University Founder (2005)
- Philip II and the "Philippine Referendum" of 1599 (2009)
- A History of Santo Tomas: Four Centuries of Higher Education in the Philippines (1611–2011) Volume I (2012)
- A History of Santo Tomas: Four Centuries of Higher Education in the Philippines (1611–2011) Volume II (2012)

== Honors ==
- Outstanding Thomasian Awardee for Historical Research (1982)
- Pro Ecclesia et Pontifice from Pope John Paul II (1984)
- Cruz de Isabel la Catolica from the King of Spain, Juan Carlos I (1985)
- Catholic Authors Award by the Asian Catholic Publishers Inc. (1991)
- National Book Awards (1999)
- Master of Sacred Theology of the Dominican Order (2009), a title once held by St. Dominic de Guzman
- Gintong Aklat Award (2014)
