= Ethyl =

Ethyl may refer to:

== Arts and entertainment ==
- Ethyl Sinclair, a character in the Dinosaurs television show

== Science and technology ==
- Ethyl group, an organic chemistry moiety
- Ethyl alcohol (or ethanol)
- Ethyl Corporation, a fuel additive company
  - Tetraethyllead-treated gasoline

== See also ==
- Ethel (disambiguation)
