= 972 =

Calendar year

972 in various calendars
- Gregorian calendar: 972; CMLXXII
- Ab urbe condita: 1725
- Armenian calendar: 421; ԹՎ ՆԻԱ
- Assyrian calendar: 5722
- Balinese saka calendar: 893–894
- Bengali calendar: 378–379
- Berber calendar: 1922
- Buddhist calendar: 1516
- Burmese calendar: 334
- Byzantine calendar: 6480–6481
- Chinese calendar: 辛未年 (Metal Goat); 3669 or 3462 — to — 壬申年 (Water Monkey); 3670 or 3463
- Coptic calendar: 688–689
- Discordian calendar: 2138
- Ethiopian calendar: 964–965
- Hebrew calendar: 4732–4733
- Hindu calendars
- Vikram Samvat: 1028–1029
- Shaka Samvat: 893–894
- Kali Yuga: 4072–4073
- Holocene calendar: 10972
- Iranian calendar: 350–351
- Islamic calendar: 361–362
- Japanese calendar: Tenroku 3 (天禄３年)
- Javanese calendar: 873–874
- Julian calendar: 972; CMLXXII
- Korean calendar: 3305
- Minguo calendar: 940 before ROC 民前940年
- Nanakshahi calendar: −496
- Seleucid era: 1283/1284 AG
- Thai solar calendar: 1514–1515
- Tibetan calendar: ལྕགས་མོ་ལུག་ལོ་ (female Iron-Sheep); 1098 or 717 or −55 — to — ཆུ་ཕོ་སྤྲེ་ལོ་ (male Water-Monkey); 1099 or 718 or −54

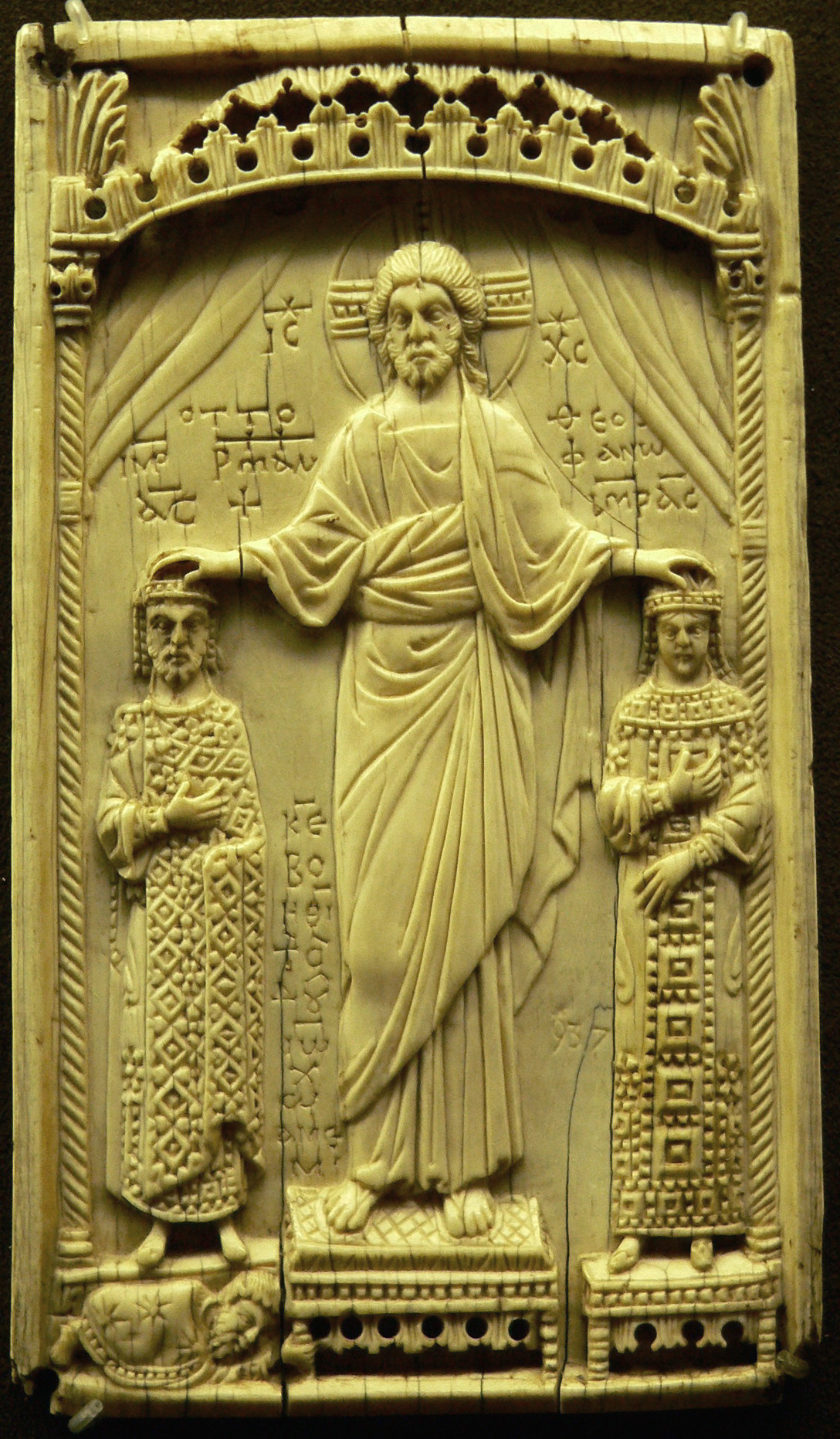
Otto II (left) and Theophanu are anointed by Pope John XIII as Emperor and Empress.

Year 972 (CMLXXII) was a leap year starting on Monday of the Julian calendar.

== Events ==
=== By place ===
==== Byzantine Empire ====
- Spring – Emperor John I Tzimiskes divides the Bulgarian territories, recently held by the Kievan Rus', into six new themes. He turns his attention to the East against the Abbasid Caliphate and its vassals, beginning with an invasion of Upper Mesopotamia. John transfers Byzantine troops to Macedonia, and the region of Philippopolis in Thrace, to dilute the Slavs.
- John I removes various Bulgarian boyars from their homes, and settles them in Constantinople and Anatolia (modern Turkey), where they are given high titles and lands.
- John I grants a charter for the Monastic Republic of Holy Mount Athos, in Greece.

==== Europe ====
- Spring – Grand Prince Sviatoslav I is ambushed by the Pechenegs (possibly in the service of the Byzantines) and killed during his attempt to cross the Dnieper rapids (modern Ukraine). His skull is made into a drinking cup. Sviatoslav is succeeded by his eldest son Yaropolk I as ruler of Kiev, which leads to a civil war with his brother Oleg.
- April 14 – Otto II (the Red), joint-ruler and son of Otto I (the Great), marries the Byzantine princess Theophanu (niece or granddaughter of John I). She is crowned empress by Pope John XIII at Rome. Creating an alliance between the Ottonian Dynasty and the Byzantine Empire (called the Tzimiscian Peace).
- June 24 – Battle of Cedynia: The Polans under prince (or Duke) Mieszko I, defeat the German forces of the Saxon count Odo I at their stronghold in Cedynia (with the help of hidden reinforcements). The battle – one of the first in Polish history – strengthens Mieszko's hold over Western Pomerania.

==== Africa ====
- Buluggin ibn Ziri is appointed viceroy in Ifriqiya (modern Tunisia) and becomes the first ruler (emir) of the Zirid Dynasty.

=== By topic ===
==== Religion ====
- September 6 – John XIII dies at Rome after a 6-year reign. He is succeeded by Benedict VI as the 134th pope of the Catholic Church.
- The monastery at the site of Peterborough Cathedral is rebuilt by Dunstan, archbishop of Canterbury.

== Births ==
- January 16 – Sheng Zong, emperor of the Liao Dynasty (d. 1031)
- March 27 – Robert II (the Pious), king of France (d. 1031)
- Abdussamed Babek, Kurdish ulama, author and poet (d. 1019/1020)
- Al-Mawardi, Abbasid jurist and diplomat (d. 1058)
- Ermesinde, countess and regent of Barcelona (d. 1058)
- Fujiwara no Seishi, Japanese empress consort (d. 1025)
- Fujiwara no Yukinari, Japanese calligrapher (d. 1027)
- Gregory V, pope of the Catholic Church (d. 999)
- Ramon Borrell, count of Barcelona (d. 1017)

== Deaths ==
- September 6 – John XIII, pope of the Catholic Church
- December 18 (or 973) – Eberhard IV, Frankish nobleman (or 973)
- Ælfwold I (or Ælfweald), bishop of Crediton
- Arnulf II, count of Boulogne (approximate date)
- Boleslaus I (the Cruel), duke of Bohemia (or 967)
- Feng Yanlu, Chinese official (approximate date)
- Fujiwara no Koretada, Japanese statesman (b. 924)
- Pope John XIII
- Khottiga Amoghavarsha, ruler of the Rashtrakuta Empire
- Kūya, Japanese priest of Pure Land Buddhism (b. 903)
- Liutprand, Lombard bishop and historian
- Sviatoslav I (Igorevich), Grand Prince of Kiev
