= Baldwin I (bishop) =

Dutch bishop

- Bishop of Utrecht
- Church: Catholic Church
- Diocese: Archdiocese of Utrecht
- In office: 990/1–994/5

Personal details
- Died: 10 May 994/5

Baldwin or Boudewijn I van Utrecht (died 10 May 994/5) was bishop of Utrecht from 990 or 991 until his death in 994 or 995. Based on the primary sources, there is no certainty regarding his year of election to bishop, or his year of death.

Baldwin came from the area around Bamberg. Little is known of his rule as bishop, beyond that he was well regarded. He was buried in the Dom Church.

Preceded by Folcmar (bishop of Utrecht)	Bishop of Utrecht; 990–995	Succeeded by Ansfried of Utrecht
