= Adalbero =

Adalbero or Adalberon (French: Adalbéron) is a masculine given name, a variant of Adalbert, derived from the Old High German words adal ("noble") and beraht ("bright") or bero ("bear"). It may refer to:

- Adalbero I of Metz (died 962), bishop
- Adalbero II of Metz (died 1005), bishop
- Adalbero (archbishop of Reims) (died 989)
- Adalberon (bishop of Laon) (died 1030/31)
- Adalbero, Duke of Carinthia (c. 980 – 1039)
- Adalbero III of Luxembourg (c. 1010 – 1072), bishop of Metz
- Adalbero of Styria (died 1086/87), margrave
- Adalbero of Würzburg (died 1090), bishop and saint

== Name day ==
- October 6: Saint Adalbero of Würzburg (Catholic)

== See also ==
- Albert (given name)
- Æthelberht (disambiguation)
