= Laurel Hall =

- U.S. National Register of Historic Places
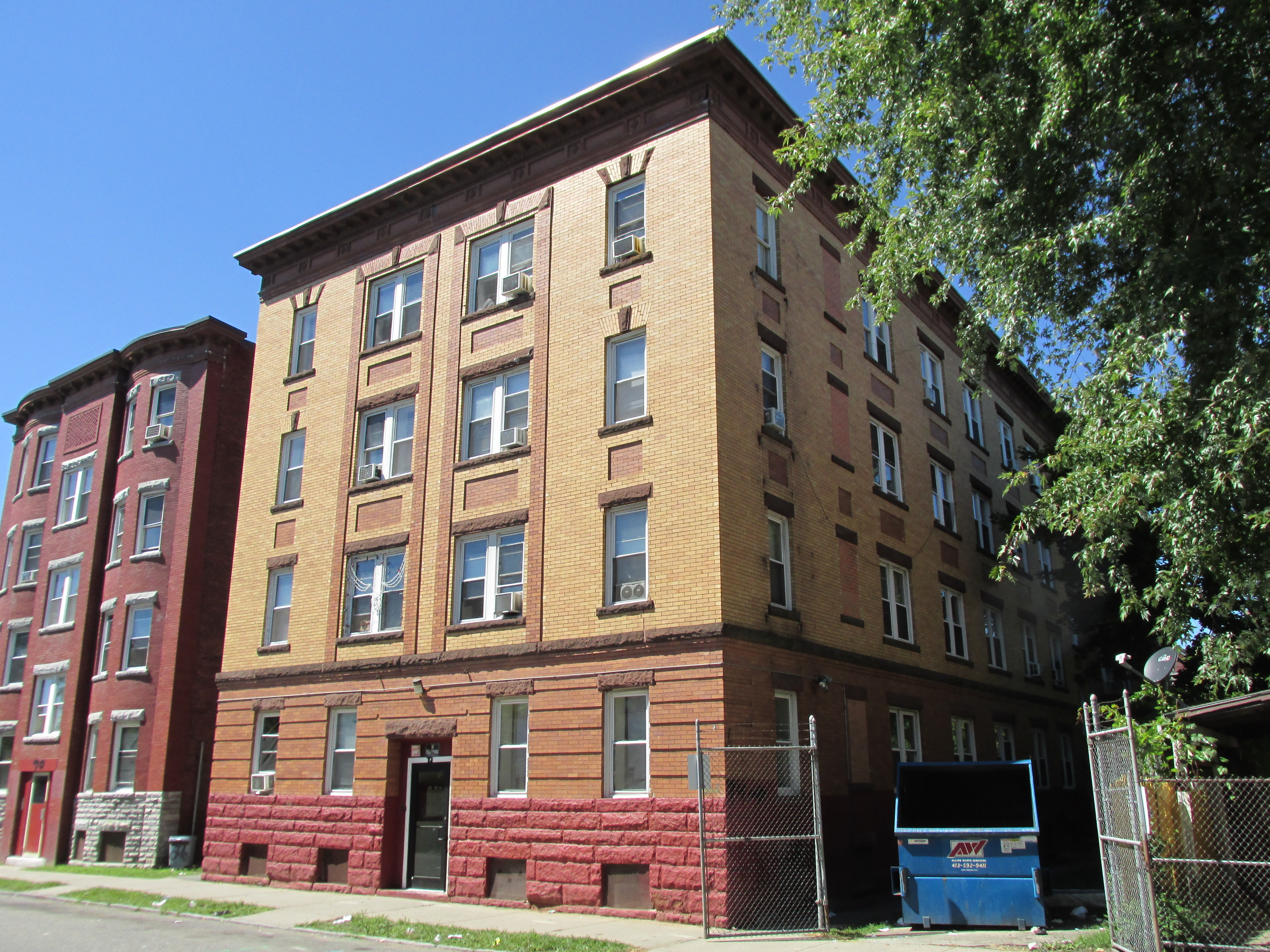
- Laurel Hall

- Location within Massachusetts Location within the United States
- Location: Springfield, Massachusetts
- Coordinates: 42°6′36″N 72°35′57″W
- Area: Less than one acre
- Built: 1914
- Architect: Bruno Wozny
- Architectural style: Classical Revival
- NRHP reference No.: 87000355
- Added to NRHP: March 6, 1987

Laurel Hall is a historic apartment house at 72—74 Patton Street in Springfield, Massachusetts, USA. Built in 1914, it is one of a small number of apartment houses built on the north side of the city's downtown area in the 1910s and 1920s. The building underwent a major rehabilitation and renovation in the 1980s. It was listed on the National Register of Historic Places in 1987.

== Description and history ==
Laurel Hall stands on the north side of Patton Street, between Main and Dwight Streets just north of Interstate 291. Now predominantly a commercial area, it was a tree-lined residential street when Laurel Hall and the adjacent Ethel Apartment House were built in the 1910s. It is a four-story Classical Revival structure, built using yellow brick (in light and dark shades), with brownstone trim and a decorated metal cornice. The ground floor begins with a half-story of rusticated brownstone, and continues with dark yellow brick with recessed spacing every few rows to provide horizontal emphasis. A brownstone belt-course separates the first floor from those above. Recessed panels of dark brick are set between the windows of the 2nd through 4th floors, and there are vertical dark brick pilasters framing the central bays. Windows are trimmed with brownstone lintels and sills.

The building was built in 1914 for a real estate agent, and was designed by Bruno Wozny, a German immigrant. The building houses sixteen units, which were in its early years occupied by working-class people. Occupancy and the building's condition declined during the 1960s, when the area became a subject of urban renewal. The interior suffered from neglect and vandalism, and has been completely modernized.

== See also ==
- Ethel Apartment House, 70 Patton Street
- National Register of Historic Places listings in Springfield, Massachusetts
- National Register of Historic Places listings in Hampden County, Massachusetts
