= Murchadh mac Aodha =

Murchadh mac Aodha (died 960) was 33rd King of Uí Maine.

== Reign and events ==
Murchadh's reign is obscure. Some of the events recorded in Uí Maine, Connacht and Ireland during his lifetime include:

- 940.Cluain-mic-Nois (Clonmacnoise) and Cill-dara (Kildare) were plundered by Blacaire, son of Godfrey, and the foreigners of Ath-cliath (Dublin) [and] A great flood in this year, so that the lower half of Cluain-mic-Nois was swept away by the water.
- 943.Two pillars of fire were a week before Allhallowtide, and they illumined the whole world.
- 945.A battle between the birds of the sea and the birds of the land at Luimneach (Limerick).
- 948.The plundering of Magh Finn by Conghalach.
- 949.The spoiling of Siol Anmchadha, and the plundering of Cluain-fearta-Brenainn (Clonfert), by Ceallachan and the men of Munster.
- 956.Áed mac Cellaig, successor of Brenainn (Abbot of Clonfert)... died.
- 959.A bolt of fire passed south-westwards through Leinster, and it killed a thousand persons and flocks as far as Ath-cliath.

Preceded by Murchadh mac Sochlachan	King of Uí Maine; 936?–960	Succeeded by Geibennach mac Aedha
