= Ethel (disambiguation) =

Ethel is an English feminine given name.

Ethel or ETHEL may also refer to:

== Places ==
=== United States ===
- Ethel, Arkansas, an unincorporated community
- Ethel, Indiana, an unincorporated community
- Ethel, Louisiana, an unincorporated community
- Ethel, Mississippi, a town
- Ethel, Missouri, a city
- Ethel, Oklahoma, an unincorporated community
- Ethel, Lewis County, Washington, an unincorporated community
- Ethel, West Virginia, an unincorporated community

=== Canada ===
- Ethel, Ontario, Canada, a hamlet

== Music ==
- "Ethel Mae" (L.C. Williams song), 1949 song by L.C. Williams
- Ethel (string quartet)
- Ethel (XM), an XM satellite radio channel

== Other uses ==
- Agnes Ethel (1846–1903), American Broadway actress
- Tropical Storm Ethel, various tropical cyclones
- 2032 Ethel, an asteroid
- Anglo-Saxon œ-rune, see Odal (rune)
  - Œ, a ligature of the letters o and e, named after the rune
- ETHEL, acronym for Electric Train Heat Ex Locomotive
- Ethel Apartment House, Springfield, Massachusetts, on the National Register of Historic Places
- Ethel (film), a 2012 documentary
- Ethel, a barque which ran aground on Ethel Beach, Yorke Peninsula, South Australia, in 1904
- Ethel (1899 ship), a steam-powered boat, one of the boats of the Mackenzie River watershed in northern Canada
- Ethel (hill), prominent hill in England's Peak District

== See also ==
- Ethel the Frog (band), a British heavy metal band from the late 1970s
- Ethyl (disambiguation)
