= Ali ibn Muhammad al-Iyadi =

Poet laureate of Fatimid Caliphate

- Born: Tunis
- Died: 976; Cairo
- Occupation: poet
- Known for: court poet of the Fatimids

Abu'l-Hasan Ali ibn Muhammad al-Iyadi al-Tunisi (Arabic: علي بن محمد الإيادي, romanized: ʿAlī ibn Muḥammad al-Iyādī; died 976) was a 10th-century Maghrebi Arabic poet in the service of the Fatimid caliphs al-Qa'im, al-Mansur, and al-Mu'izz.

His exact origin is unknown. The nisba "al-Tunisi" has led to suggestions that he was born in Tunis, but his other nisba of "al-Iyadi" suggests ties to the Iyad, a clan of the Arab Banu Hilal tribe settled near Msila. Pro-Shi'ite, he was court poet of the Isma'ili Shi'a caliphs al-Qa'im, al-Mansur, and al-Mu'izz. His reputation during his lifetime was considerable, and he was highly regarded by later critics. However, possibly due to his pro-Shi'a partisanship, which may have led to an attempted damnatio memoriae after the Zirid dynasty turned to Sunni Islam, or due to shifting literary tastes, none of his works survives in complete form. His work survives mostly in fragments that were appreciated and gathered together by later anthologists for their vivid and evocative language, such as descriptions of the Fatimid navy, a galloping horse, or the so-called Lake Palace in the palace city of Mansuriya. The only evidently pro-Shi'a works surviving are a eulogy for al-Mansur, and a moving description of the end of the famous anti-Fatimid rebel Abu Yazid. Al-Iyadi died in 976, probably in Cairo, where he had followed the Fatimid court following the Fatimid conquest of Egypt in 969.

== Sources ==
- Yalaoui, M. (2004). "ʿAlī b. Muḥammad al-Tūnisī al-Iyādī". In Bearman, P. J.; Bianquis, Th.; Bosworth, C. E.; van Donzel, E. & Heinrichs, W. P. (eds.). The Encyclopaedia of Islam, Second Edition. Volume XII: Supplement. Leiden: E. J. Brill. pp. 62–63. doi:10.1163/1573-3912_islam_SIM_8322. ISBN 978-90-04-13974-9.
