= Beatification and canonization process prior to 1983 =

Topic in Roman Catholic canon law

The process of beatification and canonization has undergone various reforms in the history of the Roman Catholic Church. For current practice, as well as a discussion of similar processes in other churches, see the article on canonization. This article describes the process as it was before the promulgation of the Codex Iuris Canonici (Code of Canon Law) of 1983.

The causes of martyrs were considered somewhat differently from those of confessors, for some points of the process.

Until after the Second Vatican Council, the conclusive acts of the canon practice and procedure of canonization were

1. the Pontifical Bull of Canonization,
2. and the Pontifical High Mass of Canonization (Beatification) celebrated in the Vatican Basilica, during which the Pope officially proclaimed the martyr or the confessor to be Saint for the whole Catholic Church.

The saint may have a church consecrated with their name, or be prayed to as an intercessor during a Votive Mass.

== Beatification ==
=== Of Confessors ===
In order to secure beatification, the most important and difficult step in the process of canonization, the regular procedure was as follows:

1. Selection of a vice-postulator by the postulator-general of the cause, to promote all the judicial inquiries necessary in places outside of Rome. Such inquiries were instituted by the local episcopal authority.
2. The preparation of the inquiries (processus) all of which were carried on by the ordinary episcopal authority. They were of three kinds: (a) Informative inquiries regarded the reputation for sanctity and miracles of the servants of God, not only in general, but also in particular instances; there might be several such inquiries if the witnesses to be examined belonged to different dioceses. (b) Processes de non cultu were instituted to prove that the decrees of Pope Urban VIII regarding the prohibition of public veneration of servants of God before their beatification had been obeyed; they were generally conducted by the bishop of the place where the relics of the servant of God were preserved. (c) Other inquiries were known as "processiculi diligentiarum" and had for their object the writings attributed to the person whose beatification was in question; they varied in number according to the dioceses where such writings were found, or were thought likely to be found, and might not be judicially executed before an "instruction" was obtained from the Promotor of the Faith by the Postulator General and by him sent to the bishop in question.
3. The results of all these inquiries were sent to Rome, to the Congregation of Rites, in charge of a messenger (portitor) chosen by the judges, or by some other secure way, in case a rescript of the Congregation dispensed from the obligation of sending a messenger.
4. They were opened, translated if necessary into Italian, a public copy was made, and a cardinal was deputed by the Pope as relator (ponens) of the cause, for all which steps rescripts of the Congregation, confirmed by the Pope, must be obtained.
5. The writings of the servant of God were next revised by theologians appointed by the cardinal Relator himself, authorized to so act by a special rescript. Meanwhile, the Advocate and the Procurator of the cause, chosen by the Postulator General, had prepared all the documents that concerned the introduction of the cause (positio super introductione causae). These consisted of (a) a summary of the informative processes, (b) an information, and (c) answers to the observations or difficulties of the Promotor of the Faith sent by him to the Postulator.
6. This collection of documents (positio) was printed and distributed to the cardinals of the Congregation of Rites 40 days before the date assigned for their discussion.
7. If nothing contrary to faith and morals was found in the writings of the servant of God, a decree was published that authorized further action (quod in causa procedi possit ad ulteriora), i. e., the discussion of the matter (dubium) of appointment or non-appointment of a commission for the introduction of the cause.
8. At the time fixed by the Congregation of Rites an ordinary meeting (congregatio) was held in which this appointment was debated by the cardinals of the aforesaid Congregation and its officials, but without the vote or participation of the Consultors, though this privilege was always granted them by prescript.
9. If in this meeting the cardinals favoured the appointment of the aforesaid Commission, a decree to that effect was promulgated, and the Pope signed it, but, according to custom, with his baptismal name, not with that of his pontificate. Thenceforward the servant of God was judicially given the title of "Venerable".
10. A petition was then presented asking remissorial letters for the bishops outside of Rome (in partibus), authorizing them to set on foot, by Apostolic authority, the inquiry (processus) with regard to the fame of sanctity and miracles in general. This permission was granted by rescript, and such remissorial letters were prepared and sent to the bishops by the Postulator General. In case the eyewitnesses were of advanced age, other remissorial letters were usually granted for the purpose of opening a process known as "inchoative" concerning the particular virtues of miracles of the person in question. This was done in order that the proofs might not be lost (ne pereant probationes), and such inchoative process preceded that upon the miracles and virtues in general.
11. While the Apostolic process concerning the reputation of sanctity was under way outside of Rome, documents were prepared by the Procurator of the cause for the discussion de non cultu, or absence of cultus, and at the appointed time an ordinary meeting (congregatio) was held in which the matter was investigated; if it was found that the decree of Pope Urban VIII had been obeyed, another decree provided that further steps might be taken.
12. When the inquiry concerning the reputation of sanctity (super fama) had arrived in Rome, it was opened (as already described in speaking of the ordinary processes, and with the same formalities in regard to rescripts), then translated into Italian, summarized, and declared valid. The documents super fama in general were prepared by the Advocate, and at the proper time, in an ordinary meeting of the cardinals of the Congregation of Rites, the question was discussed: whether there was evidence of a general repute for sanctity and miracles of this servant of God. If the answer was favourable, a decree embodying this result was published.
13. New remissorial letters were then sent to the bishops in partibus for Apostolic processes with regard to the reputation for sanctity and miracles in particular. These processes must be finished within 18 months and when they were received in Rome were opened, as above described, and by virtue of an equal number of rescripts, by the cardinal Prefect, translated into Italian, and their summary authenticated by the Chancellor of the Congregation of Rites.
14. The Advocate of the cause next prepared the documents (positio) which had reference to the discussion of the validity of all the preceding processes, informative and Apostolic.
15. This discussion was held in the meeting called congregatio rotalis from the fact that it was only judges of the Roman Rota who voted. If the difficulties of the Promotor of the Faith were satisfactorily answered, the decree establishing the validity of the inquiries or processes was published.
16. Meanwhile, all necessary preparation was made for the discussion of the question (dubium): Is there evidence that the venerable servant of God practiced virtues both theological and cardinal, and in an heroic degree? (An constet de virtutibus Ven. servi Dei, tam theologicis quam cardinalibus, in heroico gradu?) In the causes of confessors this step was of primary importance. The point was discussed in three meetings or congregations called respectively, ante-preparatory, preparatory, and general. The first of these meetings was held in the palace of the cardinal Relator of the cause, and in it only consultors of the Congregation of Sacred Rites, and with their prefect presiding, the third was also held in the Vatican City, and at it the Pope presided, and both cardinals and consultors voted. For each of these congregations the Advocate of the cause prepared and printed official reports (positiones), called respectively "report", "new report", "final report", report "concerning the virtues", et cetera (positio, positio nova, positio novissima, super virtutibus, et cetera). In each case, before proceeding to the subsequent meeting, a majority of the Consultors must decide that the difficulties of the Promotor of the Faith had been satisfactorily solved.
17. When the Congregation of Rites in the above described general meeting had decided favourably, the Pope was asked to sign the solemn decree which asserted that there existed evidence of the heroic virtues of the servant of God. This decree was not published until after the Pope, having commended the matter to God in prayer, gave a final consent and confirmed by his supreme sentence the decision of the Congregation.
18. The miracles now remained to be proved, of which two of the first class were required in case the practice of virtues in the heroic degree had been proved, in both ordinary and Apostolic inquiries or processes by eyewitnesses: three, if the eyewitnesses were found only in the ordinary processes and four, if the virtues were proven only by hearsay (de auditu) witnesses. If the miracles had been sufficiently proven in the Apostolic processes (super virtutibus) already declared valid, steps were taken at once to prepare the documents with regard to miracles (super miraculis). If in the Apostolic processes only general mention had been made of the miracles, new Apostolic processes must be opened, and conducted after the manner already described for proving the practice of virtues in an heroic degree.
19. The discussion of the particular miracles proceeded in exactly the same way and in the same order as that of the virtues. If the decisions were favourable, the general meeting of the Congregation was followed by a decree, confirmed by the Pope, in which it was announced that there was proof of miracles. In the positio for the ante-preparatory congregation there were required and were printed opinions of two physicians, one of whom had been chosen by the Postulator and the other by the Congregation of Rites. Of the three reports (positiones) above mentioned, and which were now also required, the first was prepared in the usual way; the second consisted of an exposition of the heroic virtues of the servant of God, an information, and a reply to later observations of the Promotor of the Faith; the last consisted only of an answer to his final observations.
20. When the miracles had been proved, another meeting of the Congregation of Rites was held in which it was debated once, and only once, whether or not, given the approbation of the virtues and miracles, it was safe to proceed with the solemnities of beatification. If a majority of the Consultors was favourable, the Pope issued a decree to this effect and at the time appointed by him the solemn beatification of the servant of God occurred in St. Peter's Basilica, on which occasion a Papal brief was issued permitting the public cultus and veneration of the beatified person, now known as "Blessed" ("Beatus").

=== Of Martyrs ===
1. The causes of martyrs were conducted in the same way as those of confessors as far as the informative processes and those de non cultu and ad introductionem causae were concerned. But when once the commission of introduction had been appointed they advance much more rapidly.
2. No remissorial letters were granted for Apostolic processes concerning the general reputation for martyrdom and miracles; the letters sent called for an immediate investigation into the fact of martyrdom, its motive, and the particular miracles alleged. There was no longer a discussion of the general reputation for martyrdom or miracles.
3. The miracles were not discussed, as formerly, in separate meetings, but in the same meetings that dealt with the fact and the motive of the martyrdom.
4. The miracles (signa) required were not those of the first class; those of the second class sufficed, nor was their number determined. On some occasions the decision as to miracles was entirely dispensed with.
5. The discussion as to martyrdoms and miracles, formerly held in three meetings or congregations, viz. the ante-preparatory, preparatory, and general, was at a later time usually conducted, through a dispensation to be had in each instance from the sovereign pontiff, in a single congregation known as particularis, or special. It consisted of six or seven cardinals of the Congregation of Rites and four or five prelates especially deputed by the pope. There was but one positio prepared in the usual way; if there was an affirmative majority a decree was issued concerning the proof of martyrdom, the cause of martyrdom, and miracles. (Constare de Martyrio, causâ Martyrii et signis.)
6. The final stage was a discussion of the security (super tuto) with which advance to beatification might be made, as in the case of confessors; the solemn beatification then followed.

=== Confirmation of Cult ===
This procedure was followed in all cases of formal beatification in causes of both confessors and martyrs proposed in the ordinary way ("per viam non cultus"). Those proposed as coming under the definition of cases excepted ("casus excepti") by Pope Urban VIII were treated differently. In such cases proof is required that an immemorial public veneration had been paid to the servant of God, whether as a confessor or martyr, for at least 100 years before the promulgation in 1640 of the decrees of Pope Urban VIII. Such cause was proposed under the title of "confirmation of veneration" ("de confirmatione cultus"); it was considered in an ordinary meeting of the Congregation of Rites. When the difficulties of the Promotor of the Faith had been satisfied, a Pontifical decree confirming the cultus was promulgated. Beatification of this kind was denominated "equivalent" or "virtual".

== Canonization ==
The canonization of confessors or martyrs might be taken up as soon as two miracles were reported to have been worked at their intercession, after the pontifical permission of public veneration as described above. At this stage it was only required that the two miracles worked after the permission awarding a public cultus be discussed in three meetings of the congregation. The discussion proceeded in the ordinary way; if the miracles were confirmed, another meeting (super tuto) was held. The pope then issued a Bull of Canonization in which he not only permitted, but commanded, the public cultus, or veneration, of the saint.

It may be easily conjectured that considerable time must elapse before any cause of beatification or canonization could be conducted, from the first steps of the information, inquiry, or process, to the issuing of the decree super tuto. According to the constitution of this Congregation, more than one important discussion (dubia maiora) could not be proposed at the same time. It must be remembered:

- that the same cardinals and consultors must vote in all discussions;
- that there was but one promotor of the Faith and one sub-promotor, who alone had charge of all observations to be made with regard to the dubia; and
- that these cardinals and consultors had to treat questions of ritual as well as processes of canonization and beatification.

To execute all this business there was but one weekly meeting (congressus), a kind of minor congregation in which only the cardinal prefect and the major officials voted; in it less important and practical questions were settled regarding rites as well as causes, and answers were given, and rescripts which the Pope afterwards verbally approved. The other meetings of the congregation (ordinary, rotal, and "upon virtues and miracles") might be as few as sixteen in the course of the year. Some other cause must therefore be found for the slow progress of causes of beatification or canonization than a lack of good will or activity on the part of the Congregation of Rites.

== Bibliography ==
- André Vauchez, La sainteté en Occident aux derniers siècles du Moyen Âge (1198-1431) [1], Rome, 1981 (BEFAR, 241) [Eng. Transl.Sainthood in the Later Middle Ages, Cambridge, 1987 and Ital. transl. : La santità nel Medioevo, Bologne, 1989].
