= Prioro =

Coordinates: 42°54′N 4°58′W

Prioro, Spain
- municipality
- Coat of arms
- Interactive map of Prioro, Spain
- Country: Spain
- Autonomous community: Castile and León
- Province: León
- Municipality: Prioro

Area
  - Total: 48.98 km^{2} (18.91 sq mi)
- Elevation: 1,120 m (3,670 ft)

Population (2025-01-01)
  - Total: 340
  - Density: 6.9/km^{2} (18/sq mi)
- Time zone: UTC+1 (CET)
  - Summer (DST): UTC+2 (CEST)

Prioro is a municipality located in the province of León, Castile and León, Spain. According to the 2016 census (INE), the municipality has a population of 369 inhabitants. The municipality is composed by two villages, one of them being Prioro, the main one. The other one is Tejerina, which is located seven km away.

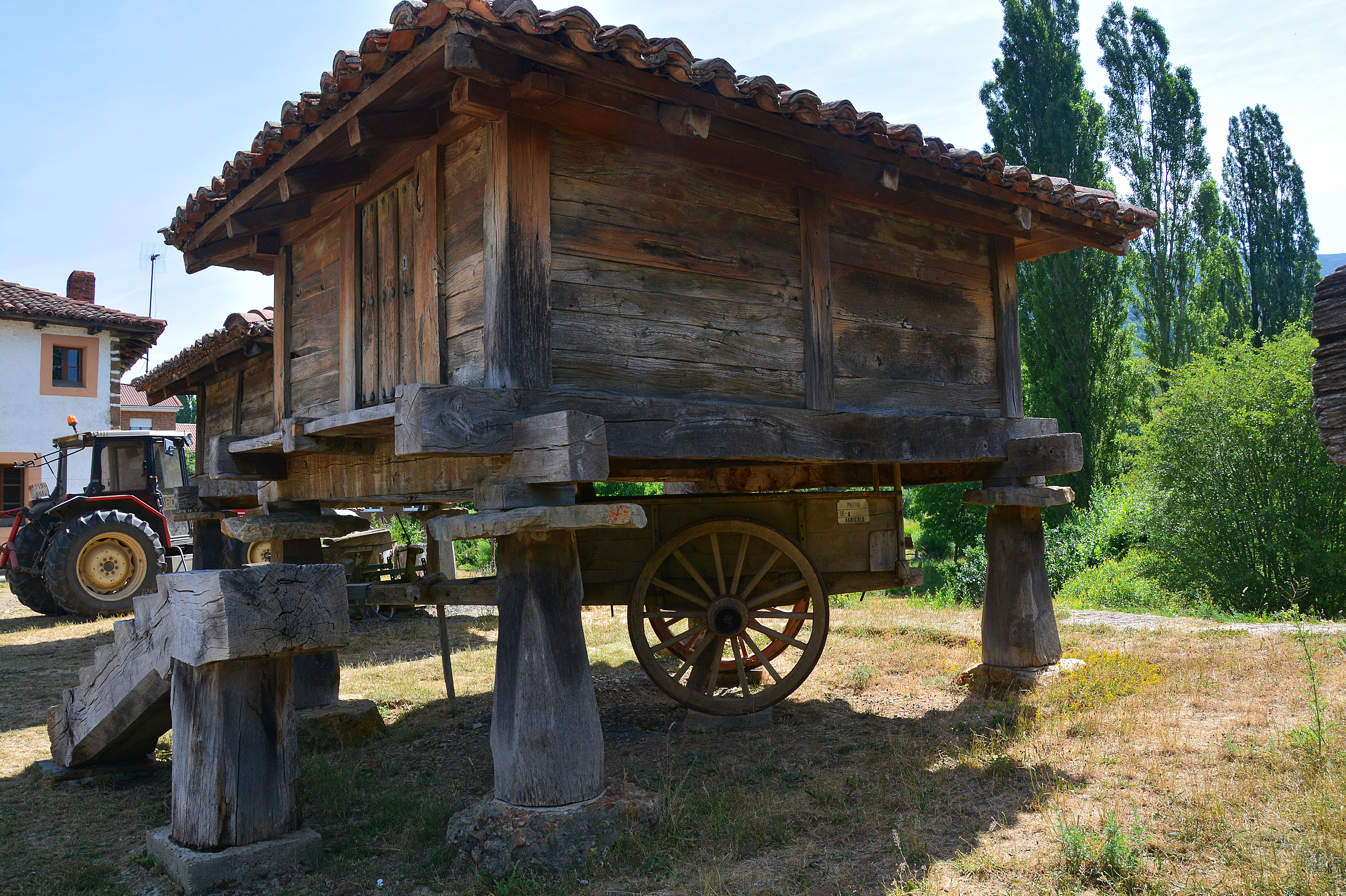
Barns in Prioro, León, Spain.
