= Ethel Apartment House =

- U.S. National Register of Historic Places
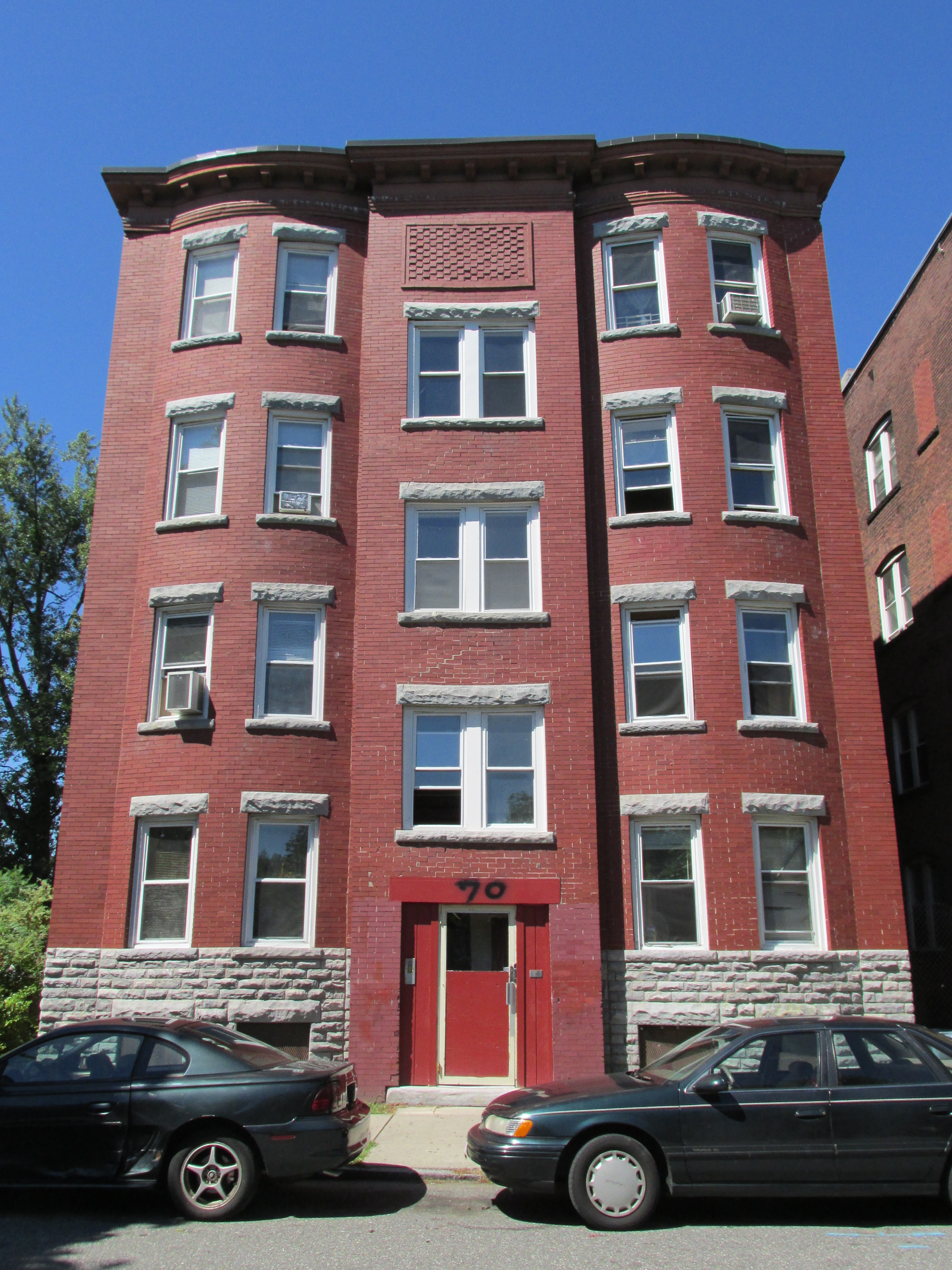
- Ethel Apartment House

- Location within Massachusetts Location within the United States
- Location: Springfield, Massachusetts
- Coordinates: 42°6′36″N 72°35′57″W
- Built: 1912
- Architect: Burton E. Geckler
- NRHP reference No.: 87000353
- Added to NRHP: March 6, 1987

The Ethel Apartment House is a historic apartment building at 70 Patton Street in the North End of Springfield, Massachusetts. The four story red brick building was built in 1912 for Jacob Blinky, a successful local retailer, at a cost of $14,000. It was designed by Burton E. Geckler, a local architect who designed a number of other apartment blocks during the 1910s. The building was listed on the National Register of Historic Places in 1987.

== Description and history ==
The Ethel Apartment House stands on the northwest side of Patton Street, facing the highway ramps of the interchange between Interstate 291 and Interstate 91. It is a four-story red brick structure, whose facade is divided into three vertical sections. The outer sections are rounded bays set on raised simulated ashlar stone foundations, with two sash windows in each bay on each level. The main entrance is in the center section, with three sets of paired windows above, offset from those of the flanking sections. All the windows have sills and lintels of cast stone similar to the foundation material. A tin cornice extends around the building below the roof. The building interior is modern.

Built in 1912, this building is one of a relatively small number of apartment blocks built in this area of the city, and replaced one and two-family houses that had previously lined the street. This building is one of a small number of buildings (along with Laurel Hall, located next door) of that period to survive large-scale urban renewal activities of the 1960s that razed much of the North End.

== See also ==
- National Register of Historic Places listings in Springfield, Massachusetts
- National Register of Historic Places listings in Hampden County, Massachusetts
