= Muhammad al-Khushani =

Arab historian and jurist

Abū ʿAbd Allāh Muḥammad b. al-Ḥārith al-Khushanī, or Al-Khushanī of Qayrawān (born Kairouan around the early tenth century CE; died Córdoba, ?981 CE), was an Arab historian, jurist and judge.

== Life ==
Al-Khushanī was born in Khushan in Kairouan, in Tunisia under the Umayyads. He studied in his home town and Tunis. However, in 923, following the rise of the Fatamid conquest in Tunisia, al-Khushani fled, like other Maliki scholars at the time. He went first to Ceuta, where he taught, and then on to the Umayyad court in Cordoba. In Spain, studying especially with Ḳāsim ibn Aṣbagh, he completed his legal training, and gained the patronage of the prince and later caliph in Cordoba, al-Ḥakam II. Al-Khushanī served accordingly as qāḍī of inheritances in Pechina; then as shūrā in Cordoba. He also practiced alchemy and medicine, perhaps subsisting on these after the death of al-Ḥakam in 976.

The year of al-Khushanī's death is not certain. Some biographers give 981, but other dates circulated; they 'knew very little information about the last years of his life'.

== Works ==
It is thought that al-Khushanī composed around a hundred works under the patronage of al-Ḥakam. Titles of works which seem not to have survived but are attributed to al-Khushanī include:

- al-Ittifāḳ wa ’l-ik̲h̲tilāf fī madhhab Mālik
- al-Taḥāṣur wa ’l-mughālāt
- al-Futyā
- al-Taʿrīf
- al-Mawlid wa ’l-wafāt
- al-Nasab
- al-Iḳtibās
- Taʾrīkh ʿUlamāʾ al-Andalus (biography)
- K. Fuḳahāʾ al-Mālikiyya (biography)

Of his surviving works, his biographical studies are most noted:

- Taʾrīkh Quḍāt al-Andalus, also known as Kitāb al-qudā bi-Qurtuba, The work is filled with documents from the Andalusian archives, oral tradition and biographical information about the qadis of al-Andalus, particularly Córdoba, down to 968. In the assessment of Charles Pellat, al-Khushanī wrote 'in a lively and instructive manner; and if he lacks a critical spirit in relaying, for instance, the fictitious story of the first three judges in Cordoba, he nevertheless does not omit items of information which are sometimes unfavourable to the Umayyads'.
- Ṭabaḳāt ʿulamāʾ Ifrīḳiya, an extensive survey of the various madhabs in his time, including the Hanafi and Ismaili. Alongside the Ṭabaḳāt by Abu al-ʿArab, this was a major source for ʿIyād's Taʾrīk̲h̲ al-Ifrīḳiyyīn. Al-Khushanī's work extends to scholars who did not belong to the Mālikī school, including people who had converted to S̲h̲īʿism in Ifrīḳiya under the Fāṭimids. Pellat concluded that 'this exile, unable to come to terms with the doctrine imposed upon his native land, may have written this work at the demand of al-Ḥakam, who was eager to know about the situation there; in this respect, the Ṭabaḳāt are interesting for the information which they give on the Fāṭimids, but the author, far from being impartial, paints a gloomy picture of the ʿulamāʾ who remained behind in Ifrīḳiya and were compelled, according to his view, to rally to the new masters, either out of financial cupidity or from fear of persecution'.

According to Pellat, al-Khushanī was also 'something of a poet (though accused of committing faults here)'.
