= Folcmar (bishop of Utrecht) =

- Bishop of Utrecht
- Church: Catholic Church
- Diocese: Archdiocese of Utrecht
- In office: 976–990

Personal details
- Died: 10 December 990

Folcmar (died 10 December 990), also named Poppo, was a bishop of Utrecht from 976 to 990.

== Life ==
Folcmar was the son of the Saxon count Adalbero and an uncle of bishop Bernward of Hildesheim, a fervent builder who was responsible for the famous bronze doors and the Christussäule (Bernward Column). Folcmar was a member of the Chapter in Hildesheim, and in 975 he became Chancellor of Otto II, Holy Roman Emperor, who afterwards appointed him to the bishopric of Utrecht. When Otto II's cousin, Henry II, Duke of Bavaria, revolted in a bid to seize the throne, he was defeated, stripped of all his possessions and placed in the custody of bishop Folcmar. After Otto II's death, Henry was released, but he soon made another attempt at the throne against the infant Otto III, Holy Roman Emperor. This kept Folcmar involved in the succession issue. Folcmar was buried in the Dom Church of Utrecht.

Preceded by Balderic of Utrecht	Bishop of Utrecht; 976–990	Succeeded by Baldwin I (bishop)
