= Evdilsemedê Babek =

Kurdish poet (972–1019)

Evdilsemedê Babek or Abdussamed Babek (born in Hakkâri; 972–1019) was a Kurdish poet who with Ali Hariri were the first to write in Kurdish (Kurmanji). Beside Kurdish, Babek also wrote in Arabic and has been described as the first Kurdish poet to emerge after the spread of Islam among Kurds.

== Biography ==
Babek was born in Hakkari and lived from 972 to 1019, or 1078. Other sources state he lived from 938 to 995. Ibn Khallikan puts his date of birth at 973.

His father was named Babek, whose father was Ebdulqasim, whose father was a poet named Mensûr. Babek travelled to study in Baghdad, Nishapur, Mosul and Hamadan, and his poems became famous and read by Kurds. Religion and nature were his main subjects. Ibn Khallikan described him as one of the most famous poets. Few of his hundreds of poems are available.
