= Melias (Domestic of the Schools) =

Byzantine general of Armenian origin

Melias (Greek: Μελίας; died 973 or 974) was a Byzantine general of Armenian origin, active in the wars against the Arabs in the east under Nikephoros II Phokas and John I Tzimiskes. He was defeated before Amid in 973 by the Hamdanids and died in captivity shortly after.

== Life ==
Melias was a relative and namesake of Melias (Armenian: Mleh), an Armenian who entered Byzantine service in the early 900s under Leo VI the Wise, founded the border province of Lykandos, and played a major role in Byzantium's wars with its Arab neighbours until the 930s. Melias is mentioned in the sources only during the early reign of John I Tzimiskes (reigned 969–976), but is depicted on horseback along with Tzimiskes in the so-called "Pigeon House" church (cf. Churches of Göreme) at Çavuşin in Cappadocia, which was built and painted during the reign of Tzimiskes' predecessor Nikephoros II Phokas (r. 963–969) to commemorate him and his family. Melias' and Tzimiskes' presence is probably connected with their participation in Nikephoros II's conquest of Cilicia in 965. Although Melias is identified as a magistros in the "Pigeon House", this is a later emendation over the original inscription; he probably gained the rank of magistros at or after Tzimiskes' accession.

Melias is mentioned in the sources as a participant in the expeditions against the Arabs in Upper Mesopotamia in 972–973. The first expedition, in autumn and winter of 972, was led by Tzimiskes in person and resulted in the capture of Nisibis and Mayyafariqin (Greek: Martyropolis), forcing the local Arab ruler, the Hamdanid emir Abu Taghlib, to agree to pay an annual tribute in exchange for the Byzantines' withdrawal. Tzimiskes then withdrew from the area, but left Melias in his stead as Domestic of the Schools of the East (commander-in-chief of the eastern field army). Melias then advanced against Amid with an army numbering, according to the Arab sources, 50,000 men. The commander of the local garrison, Hezarmerd, called upon Abu Taghlib for aid, and the latter sent his brother, Abu'l-Qasim Hibat Allah, who arrived before the city on 4 July 973. On the next day, a battle was fought before the walls of Amid in which the Byzantines were defeated. Melias and a group of other Byzantine generals were captured on the next day and brought captive to Abu Taghlib.

Melias died soon after in captivity, but the sources disagree on the date and cause. The 11th-century historian Yahya of Antioch and Stephen of Taron record that he remained captive at Abu Taghlib's court until his death in February/March 974. The 13th-century Persian historian Rashid-al-Din Hamadani on the other hand states that Melias died soon after the battle before Amid of his wounds. Ibn al-Athir and others record that he died in the year 363 AH (October 973 – September 974) of an illness, although Abu Taghlib had sent doctors to help him, while the less reliable accounts of Matthew of Edessa and Bar Hebraeus claim that he was brought to Baghdad, where he died from an ulcer.

== Sources ==
- Baun, Jane Ralls (2007). Tales from Another Byzantium: Celestial Journey and Local Community in the Medieval Greek Apocrypha. New York: Cambridge University Press. ISBN 978-0521823951.
- Kazhdan, Alexander; Cutler, Anthony (1991). "Melias". In Kazhdan, Alexander (ed.). The Oxford Dictionary of Byzantium. Oxford and New York: Oxford University Press. ISBN 0-19-504652-8.
- Lilie, Ralph-Johannes; Ludwig, Claudia; Pratsch, Thomas; Zielke, Beate (2013). Prosopographie der mittelbyzantinischen Zeit Online. Berlin-Brandenburgische Akademie der Wissenschaften. Nach Vorarbeiten F. Winkelmanns erstellt (in German). Berlin and Boston: De Gruyter.
- Whittow, Mark (1996). The Making of Byzantium, 600–1025. Berkeley and Los Angeles, California: University of California Press. ISBN 978-0-520-20496-6.

Unknown Title last held by John Tzimiskes	Domestic of the Schools of the East ca. 972–973	Unknown Title next held by Bardas Phokas the Younger
