= Cea (river) =

River in Spain

Coordinates: 41.9992°N 5.6033°W

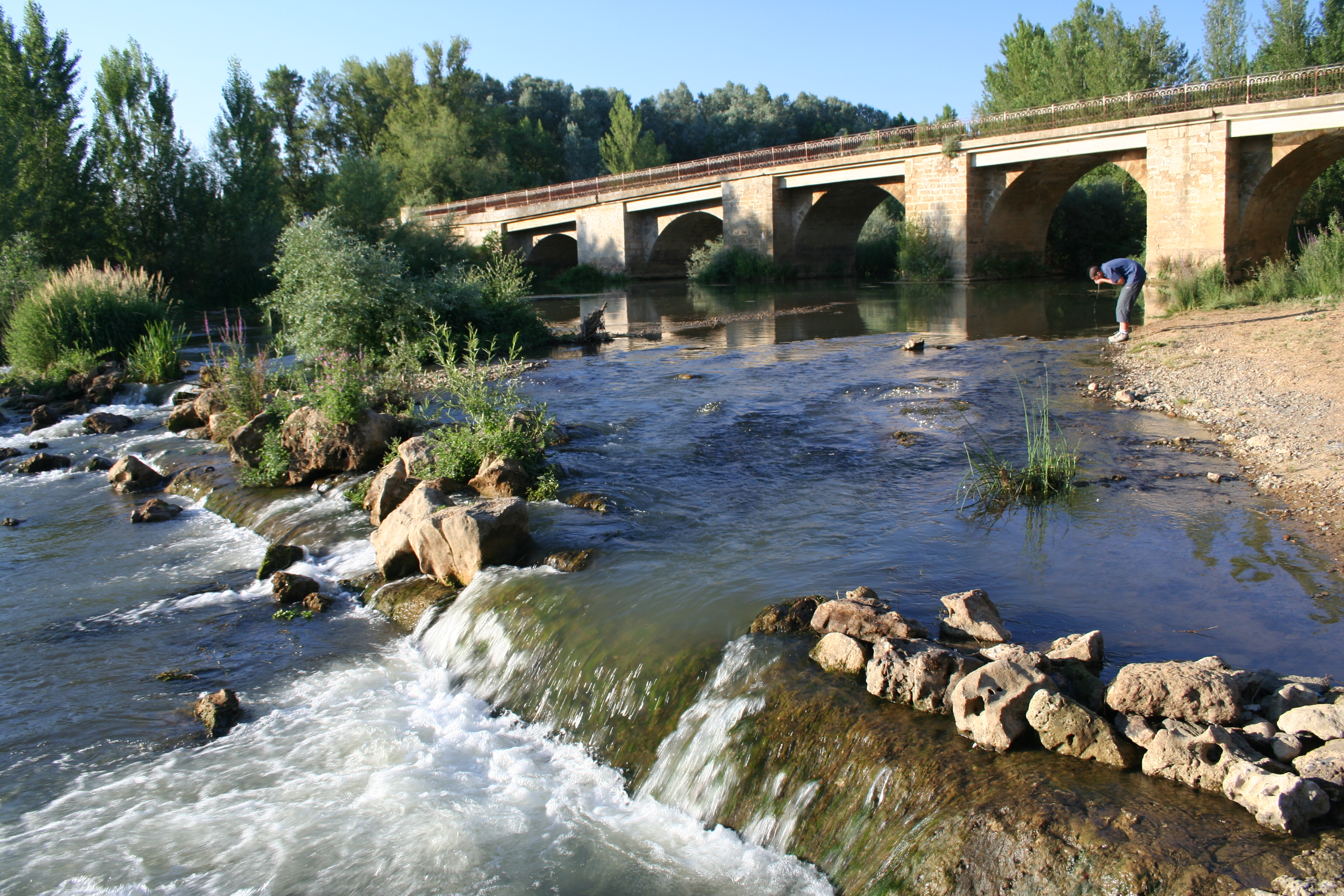
The Cea River as it runs through Mayorga.

The Cea River is a river of northwestern Spain. It is an affluent of the Esla River, and its course runs through the provinces of León, Valladolid and Zamora. It is 157 km long. Its source is in the municipality of Prioro, in León province. It rises from a spring called Fuente del Pescado, at the foot of the Peñas Prietas.

== See also ==
- List of rivers of Spain
