= Allegiance =

Duty of fidelity, typically to a country

An allegiance is a duty of fidelity said to be owed, or freely committed, by the people, subjects or citizens to their state or sovereign.

== Etymology ==
The word allegiance comes from Middle English ligeaunce (see Medieval Latin ligeantia, "a liegance"). The al- prefix was probably added through confusion with another legal term, allegation. The connection with Latin ligare, "to bind," is erroneous.

== Usage ==
Traditionally, English legal commentators used the term allegiance in two ways. One referred to "local allegiance"—the deference expected even from foreigners within a country. Another sense was "natural allegiance," owed by native-born citizens.

=== United Kingdom ===
The English doctrine once held that allegiance was indelible: Nemo potest exuere patriam. Before 1870, anyone born or naturalized in Britain owed lifelong allegiance unless parliament permitted otherwise. This doctrine was a factor in the War of 1812.

Allegiance bound subject to monarch, and monarch to subject: duplex et reciprocum ligamen ("double and reciprocal bond").

Four types of allegiance were recognized:

- Natural allegiance: by birth within the sovereign's dominions.
- Acquired allegiance: by naturalization or denization.
- Local allegiance: owed by aliens while in the country's protection.
- Legal allegiance: due when an alien takes an oath required for an office.

The Naturalization Act 1870 allowed British subjects to renounce nationality under specified conditions.

=== United States ===
The U.S. rejected indelible allegiance early. John Rutledge declared in Talbot v. Janson that dual citizenship was possible. The Expatriation Act of 1868 declared expatriation a natural right. Dual allegiance can lead to conflicting duties, possibly treason, so renunciation may be necessary.

=== In Islam ===
In Arabic, allegiance is bay'ah (بيعة), meaning "taking hand." The Quran references it in Surah 48:10.

== Oath of allegiance ==
An oath of allegiance pledges fidelity to the sovereign (or nation in republics). In the U.S., this is embodied in the Pledge of Allegiance, which is voluntary due to the First Amendment.

== See also ==
- Legitimacy (political)
- Mandate of Heaven
- Usurpation
