= Geibennach mac Aedha =

Geibennach mac Aedha (died 973) was 34th King of Uí Maine and buried at Toomour Abbey, Co. Sligo.

== Reign ==
Geibennach's era is poorly documented. Events which occurred in his time included:

960. Murchadh, son of Aedh, lord of Ui-Maine of Connaught, died. Inis-mor in Loch-Ribh was taken by Murchadh Ua Ceallaigh from Ceallach, son of Ruarc, lord of Feara-Cul Teathbha, i.e. lord of the Sil-Ronain; and he was carried as a prisoner with his fleet into Ui-Maine.

961.An unusual thing was done by the King Domhnall, son of Muircheartach; namely, he brought vessels over Dabhall, and across Sliabh Fuaid, to Loch Ainninn, so that the islands of the lake were plundered by him.

961.A victory was gained by Fearghal, King of Connaught, over the Munstermen, upon the Sinainn, i.e. the victory of Catinchi, between Cluain-fearta and Cluain-mic-Nois; and Dal-gCais was afterwards plundered by him.

963.An intolerable famine in Ireland, so that the father used to sell his son and daughter for food.

971.Finachta Ua Flaithri, Abbot of Tir-da-ghlas, and Conchobhar, son of Tadhg of the Tower, King of Connaught, died.

973.A battle between Murchad ua Flaithbertaig and the Connachta, in which fell Cathal son of Tadc, king of Connacht, and Géibennach son of Aed, king of Uí Maini, and many others. This was the battle of battle of Ceissi Corainn.

| Preceded by Murchadh mac Aodha | King of Uí Maine; 960–973 | Succeeded by Muirgus mac Domnaill |
