= Wang Zeng =

Wang Zeng (王曾)

grand councilor of the Song dynasty
- In office August 3, 1022 – August 9, 1029 Serving with Feng Zheng, Wang Qinruo, Zhang Zhibai, Zhang Shixun, Lü Yijian
- In office March 25, 1035 – May 9, 1037 Serving with Lü Yijian
- Monarch: Emperor Renzong

Personal details
- Born: c. 978 Yidu County, Qīng Prefecture, Song Empire
- Died: December 21, 1038 (aged 59–60) Yùn Prefecture, Song Empire

Wang Zeng
- Chinese: 王曾
Transcriptions
Standard Mandarin
- Hanyu Pinyin: Wáng Zēng
- Wade–Giles: Wang^{2} Tseng^{1}

Wang Xiaoxian
- Chinese: 王孝先
Transcriptions
Standard Mandarin
- Hanyu Pinyin: Wáng Xiàoxiān

Wang Zeng (c. 978 – 21 December 1038, courtesy name Xiaoxian) was a Song dynasty scholar-official who served as grand councilor during Emperor Renzong's early reign, first between 1022 and 1029, and later between 1035 and 1037.

Wang was widely respected for his honesty and fairness, and people even set up shrines with his portrait when he was alive. Politically, Wang was a major opponent of Ding Wei and held Empress Dowager Liu's imperial ambitions in check.

== During Emperor Zhenzong's reign ==
Orphaned at a young age, Wang Zeng was raised by his paternal uncle. In Emperor Zhenzong's early reign, Wang Zeng scored first in the provincial examination, and first in the subsequent imperial examination. Wang's first assignment was in Ji Prefecture, not far from his hometown, where he served as prefectural supervisor. Returning to the national capital Kaifeng, Wang interviewed at the Institute of Academicians, where he impressed the grand councilor Kou Zhun, who recommended him to interview at the Administration Chamber. Wang was subsequently appointed concurrent posts in the Palace Library (as editorial director), Historiography Institute, and State Finance Commission (as an assistant).

== Notes and references ==
- (in Chinese) Toqto'a; et al., eds. (1345). Song Shi (宋史) [History of Song].
