= King Edgar's council at Chester =

973 royal council in Anglo-Saxon England

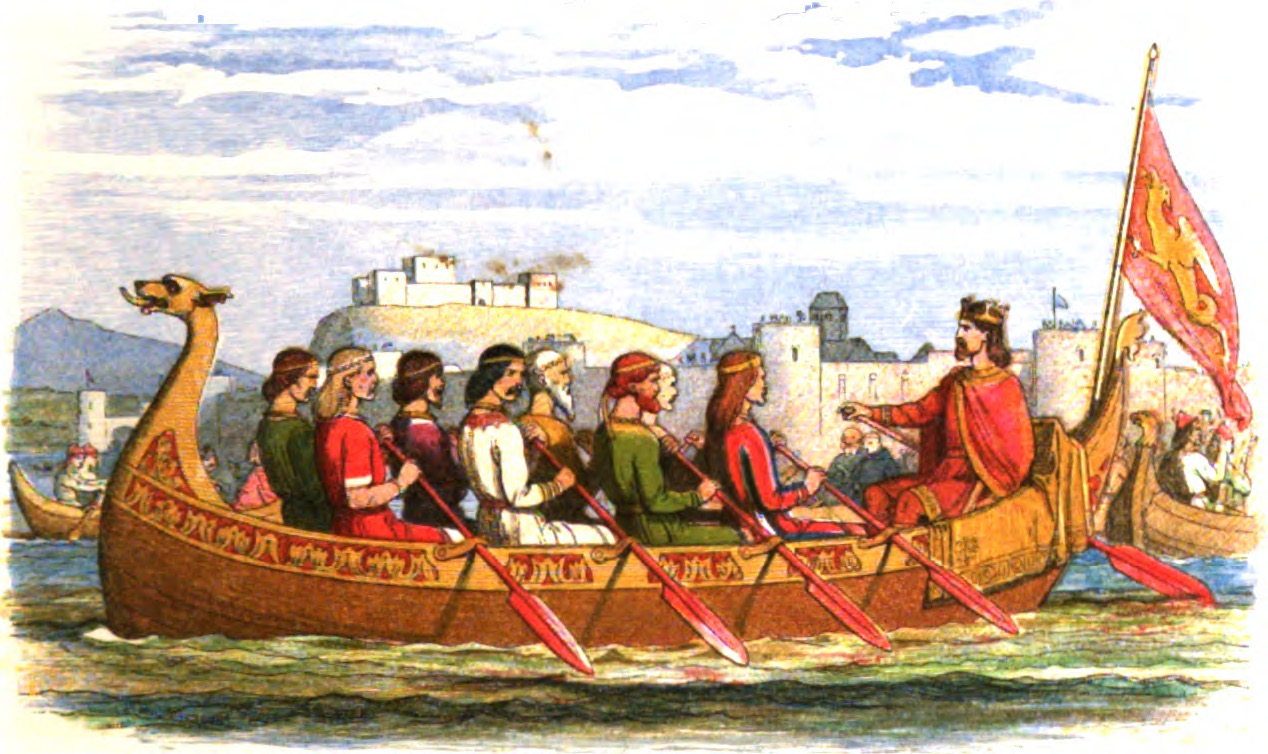
A Victorian representation of Edgar being rowed on the River Dee.

King Edgar the Peaceful's council at Chester took place in AD 973 shortly after Edgar's coronation at Bath. What happened at Chester has been heavily obscured by the embellishments and political environment of later, particularly twelfth century, chroniclers, however, it is claimed that several kings came and pledged their allegiance to Edgar, including Kenneth II of Scotland and Máel Coluim I of Strathclyde and five from Wales. The chroniclers wrote that these kings pledged their faith that they would be Edgar's liege-men on sea and land. Later chroniclers made the kings into eight, all plying the oars of Edgar's state barge on the River Dee. Such embellishments may not be factual, and what actually happened is unclear.

Eadwulf Evil-child, the earl of Bamburgh, Oslac, the earl of York, and Bishop Ælfsige of Lindisfarne escorted Kenneth to the council at Chester. Chroniclers wrote that after Kenneth had reportedly done homage, Edgar rewarded Kenneth by granting him Laudian (thought to be Lothian), thereby changing the frontier between Northumbria and Alba (this was the nascent Anglo-Scottish border) in Alba's favour.

== Location ==
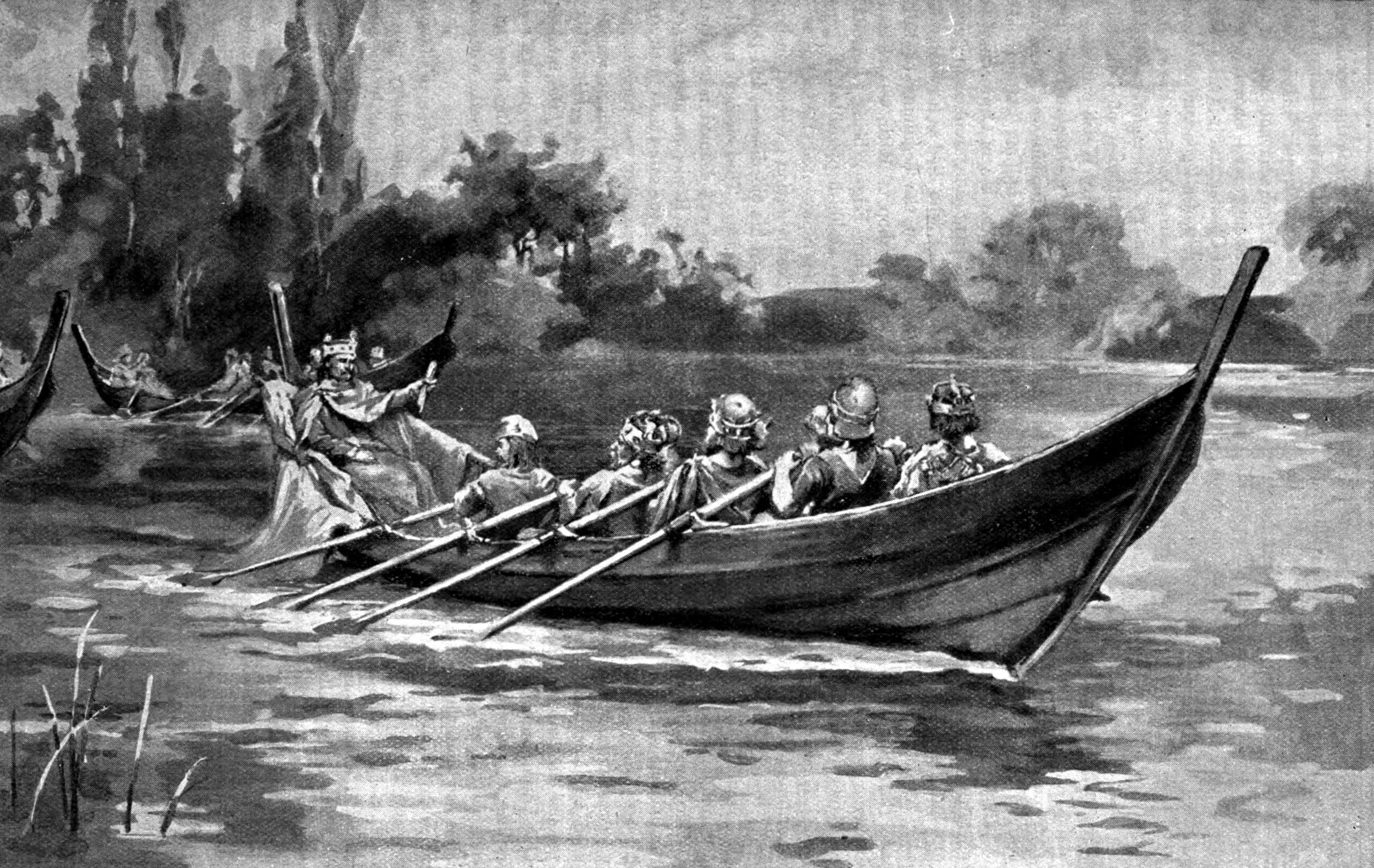
An early twentieth-century depiction of Edgar being rowed down the River Dee by eight kings. According to the Anglo-Saxon Chronicle, Edgar met six kings at Chester. By the twelfth century, chroniclers alleged that eight kings rowed Edgar down the river in an act of submission.

The traditional location of Edgar's royal residence in Chester is known as Edgar's Field, a park in Handbridge, a district of Chester. The barge is thought to have been rowed from Edgar's residence up the Dee to St John's Church on the opposite bank.
