= Yang Guangmei =

Yang Mei / Yang Guangmei

Personal details
- Born: 931 likely modern Wenshui County, Shanxi
- Died: 978 (aged 46–47) modern Kaifeng, Henan
- Full name: Surname: Yáng (楊); Given name: Guāngměi (光美), changed to Měi (美) in 976

Yang Mei (楊美) (c. 931 – c. 978), named Yang Guangmei (楊光美) before 976, was a general in ancient China, first in the Later Zhou military and later in the Northern Song military.

== Biography ==
Yang Guangmei first followed general Guo Wei under Later Han. After Guo Wei overthrew Later Han to found the Later Zhou, he followed the future Emperor Shizong of Later Zhou in conquering southern Anhui and became a governor (刺史) of Baizhou (白州).

As an old acquaintance of Emperor Taizu of Song, who overthrew Later Zhou and founded the Song dynasty, Yang Guangmei was promoted to Military Messenger of Qingzhou in 962. Yang Guangmei led a modest and simple life and won the hearts of his constituents, and when he was asked to come back to the capital in 964, hundreds of citizens begged him to stay, blocking the way until soldiers started beating the leaders.

He was one of the military commanders in the conquest of Later Shu Kingdom and also participated in the conquest of Northern Han Kingdom during Emperor Taizong's reign, becoming a jiedushi. He was generous to his subordinates and former friends; when he died in 978 from an illness, his family was left penniless.
