= Nefingus =

Bishop of Angers (died 973)

Nefingus (died 12 September 973), in French Néfingue, was the bishop of Angers from 966 until his death. His predecessor, Aimo, died on 19 October 966.

Nefingus was a noted benefactor of the Abbey of Saint-Aubin d'Angers. With the support of Count Geoffrey I of Anjou, he replaced its secular canons with Benedictine monks and in 970 secured the abbey the right to elect its abbot free from outside interference. In 972 as bishop he confirmed its privileges. His death is recorded in the obituary of Angers Cathedral. He was succeeded by Renaud II, who secured his election with a simoniacal payment Count Geoffrey. According to the Annales de Vendôme, this succession plan was worked out in advance while Nefingus was still living. One effect of this plan was that the see did not fall vacant and the count was unable to collect the diocesan revenues, as he otherwise would have during a vacancy.

== Sources ==
- Boussard, Jacques (1970). "Les évêques en Neustrie avant la Réforme grégorienne (950–1050 environ)". Journal des savants. 3 (3): 161–96. doi:10.3406/jds.1970.1228.
- Fanning, Steven (1988). "A Bishop and His World Before the Gregorian Reform: Hubert of Angers, 1006–1047". Transactions of the American Philosophical Society. 78 (1): 1–193. doi:10.2307/1006555. ISBN 9780871697813. JSTOR 1006555.
