= 910s =

Decade

The 910s decade ran from January 1, 910, to December 31, 919.

== Events ==
=== 910 ===
==== By place ====
====== Europe ======
- June 12 – Battle of Augsburg: The Hungarians defeat the East Frankish army under King Louis IV (the Child), using the famous feigned retreat tactic of the nomadic warriors. Count Gausbert, the actual commander of the East Frankish army (because Louis IV is only 16 years old at this time), is killed in the battle.
- June 22 – Battle of Rednitz: The Hungarians defeat the East Frankish army near the Rednitz River, killing its leader Gebhard, Duke of Lotharingia (Lorraine). After the battle Louis IV, together with the East Frankish duchies Franconia, Lotharingia, Bavaria and Saxony, agrees to pay tribute to the Hungarian state.
- Summer – King Alfonso III of Asturias is forced to abdicate the throne and partitions the kingdom among his three sons. The eldest son, García I, becomes king of León. The second son, Ordoño II, reigns in Galicia, while the third, Fruela II, receives Asturias with Oviedo as his capital.

====== Britain ======
- August 5 – Battle of Tettenhall: King Edward the Elder attacks the joint-Kings Eowils and Halfdan of Norse York. All three Viking monarchs are killed in battle (one chronicle mentions a third brother) and the Viking army is decisively defeated by allied forces of Mercia and Wessex. The co-Kings are succeeded by Ragnall ua Ímair.

==== By topic ====
====== Religion ======
- William I (the Pious) of Aquitaine, donates land in Burgundy for the building of a Benedictine monastery dedicated to the saints Peter and Paul. Hence the Abbey of Cluny, becomes the largest in the West. In the foundation charter, William renounces all rights to the monastery and nominates Berno as the first abbot of Cluny (Eastern France). He places the monastery directly under the control of the Papal See.
- Gabriel I becomes Pope of the Coptic Orthodox Church in Alexandria (Egypt).

=== 911 ===
==== By place ====
====== Europe ======
- September 24 – King Louis IV (the Child), the last Carolingian ruler of the East Frankish Kingdom, dies at Frankfurt am Main after an 11-year reign. The East Frankish dukes elect Conrad I at Forchheim as the king of the East Frankish Kingdom. Charles III is elected as king of Lotharingia. Conrad is chosen through the influence of Louis' guardian and regent, Hatto I, archbishop of Mainz.
- Autumn – King Charles III (the Simple) and Rollo, leader of the Vikings, sign a peace agreement (Treaty of Saint-Clair-sur-Epte). In return for his homage and conversion to Christianity, Rollo becomes a vassal and is made Count of Rouen; this is the beginning of the duchy of Normandy. He divides the lands between the rivers Epte and Risle among his chieftains, and prevents any other Vikings sailing up the Seine to attack the West Frankish Kingdom.
- The Hungarians cross Bavaria, and invade Swabia and Franconia. They plunder the territories from Minfeld to Aargau. After that, they cross the Rhine, and attack Burgundy for the first time.
- The Fatimids begin the conquest of Sicily, over their Aghlabid archrivals. Fatimid Sicilian governor Ibn al-Khinzir raids the south Italian coast (approximate date).

====== Britain ======
- Lord Æthelred of Mercia dies. He is buried in St. Oswald's Priory at Gloucester and is succeeded by his wife, Princess Æthelflæd, as Lady of the Mercians. Her brother, King Edward the Elder, insists on taking control of London and Oxford.

====== Africa ======
- A rebellion of the Kutama Berbers against the Fatimid Caliphate occurs. The Kutama tribesmen were previously the main supporters of the Shia regime.

==== By topic ====
====== Religion ======
- April 14 – Pope Sergius III dies at Rome after a 7-year reign. He is succeeded by Anastasius III as the 120th pope of the Catholic Church.

=== 912 ===
==== By place ====
====== Byzantine Empire ======
- May 11 – Emperor Leo VI (the Wise) dies after a 26-year reign, in which he has completed the Byzantine code of laws (Basilika). He is succeeded by his brother Alexander III as emperor (basileus) alongside Leo's 6-year-old son Constantine VII. Alexander becomes de facto ruler of the Byzantine Empire and expels Empress Zoe Karbonopsina, the mother of Constantine, from the palace and exiles her to a nunnery.

====== Europe ======
- German dukes Henry the Fowler of Saxony and Arnulf I (the Bad) of Bavaria claim themselves to be sovereign princes, not recognizing the authority of their overlord, King Conrad I of the East Frankish Kingdom, as he is not a Carolingian. Duke Erchanger II of Swabia and Conrad's brother, Duke Eberhard III of Franconia, support the Conradines.
- Orso II Participazio becomes the doge of Venice. He sends his son Pietro to Constantinople in order to re-establish the relationship with Alexander III.
- King Ordoño II of Galicia continues his expansion of the Christian polity. He sacks the cities of Mérida and Évora.

====== Britain ======
- Lady Æthelflæd expands her policy by building defensive burghs at Shrewsbury and Bridgnorth. The fortifications are needed to protect Mercia against plundering Vikings from the Danelaw (Danish territory in England).

====== Arabian Empire ======
- October 16 – Abd al-Rahman III succeeds his grandfather Abdullah ibn Muhammad (after his execution) and becomes emir of Córdoba (Al-Andalus).
- The second rebellion in two years, of the Kutama tribesmen against the Fatimid Caliphate, occurs.

====== China ======
- July 18 – Emperor Taizu (Zhu Wen) is murdered in the imperial palace at Kaifeng by his eldest living son Zhu Yougui after a 5-year reign. He succeeds his father as the ruler of Later Liang.

==== By topic ====
====== Religion ======
- Euthymius I is deposed as Patriarch of Constantinople, and Nicholas Mystikos is restored.

=== 913 ===
==== By place ====
====== Byzantine Empire ======
- June 6 – Emperor Alexander III dies of exhaustion while playing the game tzykanion (Byzantine name for polo). He is succeeded by his 8-year-old nephew Constantine VII Porphyrogennetos ("born in the purple"), a son of the late emperor Leo VI (the Wise). The government is administered by a regency council composed of Constantine's mother, Empress Zoe Karbonopsina, Patriarch Nicholas Mystikos and his guardian John Eladas.
- August – Byzantine–Bulgarian War: Simeon I (the Great), ruler (knyaz) of the Bulgarian Empire, launches a campaign at the head of a large Bulgarian army, and reaches Constantinople unopposed. The Bulgarians besiege the Byzantine capital and construct ditches from the Golden Horn to the Golden Gate at the Marmara Sea. After negotiations the siege is lifted and Simeon is recognised as emperor of the Bulgarians.
- Summer – Constantine Doukas, a Byzantine general (magister militum), tries, unsuccessfully, with the support of several aristocrats to usurp the throne from the young Constantine VII. He is killed in a clash by the soldiers of the Hetaireia guard, assembled by John Eladas. His head is cut off and presented to Constantine.

====== Europe ======
- Battle of the Inn: The Hungarians invade Bavaria, Swabia and Northern Burgundy. At their return they face the combined armies of Arnulf (duke of Bavaria), Erchanger and Burchard II (dukes of Swabia), who defeat them at Aschbach near the Inn River (modern Germany).

====== Britain ======
- King Edward the Elder begins with the 'reconquest' of the Danelaw and occupies Essex. Death of High-Reeve Eadwulf II. He is succeeded by his son Ealdred I, who is almost immediately driven out by King Ragnall ua Ímair of Norse York. Ealdred flees to the court of King Constantine II of Scotland.

====== Arabian Empire ======
- Caliph Abdullah al-Mahdi Billah of the Fatimid Caliphate replaces the unpopular governor Ibn Abi Khinzir with Ali ibn Umar al-Balawi. But the Sicilian lords find this unacceptable and decide to declare independence of Sicily. They acknowledge allegiance to the Abbasid caliph Al-Muqtadir and acclaim an Aghlabid prince, Ahmed ibn Khorob, as emir of Sicily. The Sicilians re-launch their conquest of Byzantine Calabria, while Ahmed ibn Khorob in Sicily leads a successful assault against the North African cities of Sfax and Tripoli.

==== By topic ====
====== Religion ======
- Summer – Pope Anastasius III dies at Rome after a 2-year reign. He is succeeded by Lando as the 121st pope of the Catholic Church.
- San Miguel de Escalada is built in León (Northern Spain) by orders of King García I (approximate date).

=== 914 ===
==== By place ====
====== Byzantine Empire ======
- Spring – Empress Zoe Karbonopsina leads a palace coup at Constantinople and, with the support of the magistros John Eladas, overthrows Patriarch Nicholas Mystikos as regent over her son, Emperor Constantine VII. She allows Nicholas to remain as patriarch, repudiates the title granted to Simeon I of Bulgaria (see 913) and nullifies the marriage plans (with a Bulgarian princess) made for her son by Nicholas.
- Summer – Byzantine–Bulgarian War: Simeon I, with the Bulgarian army, invades the themes of Thrace and Macedonia. Simultaneously, the Bulgarian troops penetrate into the regions of Dyrrhachium and Thessalonica to the west. Thrace's largest and most important city, Adrianople (modern Turkey), is besieged and captured. However, the Byzantines promptly regain the city in exchange for a huge ransom.

====== Europe ======
- January 19 – King García I dies at Zamora (Spain) after a 4-year reign. He is succeeded by his brother Ordoño II, who becomes king of Galicia and León. Ordoño continues his expansion and settles his court in León.
- Summer – Saracens from Garigliano establish advanced strongholds in Lazio at Trevi (in the Sabine Hills, near Palestrina) and Sutri. From here, they encroach on the papal cities of Orte, Narni and Nepi with impunity.
- Viking raiders establish a settlement near Waterford (Ireland) led by Ottir (the Black). The Dublin Vikings are forced to pay tribute to the Irish kings of Meath and Leinster as the price to keeping their independence.
- In Al-Andalus a drought leads to a terrible famine in the Iberian Peninsula, which continues in 915. In his centralization effort, the Umayyad caliph Abd al-Rahman III, reconquers Seville from the Banu Hajjaj clan.

====== Britain ======
- Vikings devastate the Welsh coast and move up the Severn River. They capture Bishop Cyfeilliog of Ergyng, and he is ransomed by King Edward the Elder. The Vikings are defeated by levies from Hereford and Gloucester.
- Æthelflæd, Lady of the Mercians, a daughter of King Alfred the Great, builds a burh or fortified dwelling at Warwick and repairs Eddisbury hill fort. She leads the Mercians in their fight against the Danish invaders.

====== Africa ======
- January 24 – The Fatimid general, Hubasa ibn Yusuf of the Kutama Berber tribe, marches out with his troops to invade Egypt. He follows the coastline, and takes possession of the only two towns of any size Syrte and Ajdabiya, without a struggle. The garrisons of the two towns—the westernmost outposts of the Abbasid Caliphate—have already fled.
- February 6 – Hubasa takes Barqah (modern-day Benghazi), the ancient capital of Cyrenaica. The Abbasid governor withdraws to Egypt, before the superior strength of the Fatimids. With this rich, fertile province fallen into his hands, it provides Hubāsa with 24,000 gold dinars in annual revenues from taxes, as well as 15,000 dinars paid by Christians.
- July 11 – Al-Qa'im bi-Amr Allah, son of the Fatimid caliph Abdullah al-Mahdi Billah, leaves Raqqada at the head of an army, which is composed of Kutama warriors and the Arab jund (personal guard) in an attempt to conquer Egypt. He sends orders to Hubāsa to wait for him, but driven by ambition Hubāsa is already on his way to Alexandria.
- August 27 – Hubasa captures Alexandria, after a victorious encounter with Egyptian troops near al-Hanniyya (modern-day El Alamein). The Abbasid governor Takin al-Khazari refuses to surrender and asks for reinforcements, which reach him in September. Shortly after al-Qa'im bi-Amr Allah enters Alexandria, with the rest of his army.
- December – The Fatimid army under Hubasa leaves Alexandria, followed by al-Qa'im bi-Amr Allah. The Abbasid troops hold Fustat and begin a counter-offensive against the invaders. The Kutama cavalry suffers heavy losses to the Turkish archers.

====== Arabian Empire ======
- January 12 – Ahmad Samani, emir of the Samanid Empire, is murdered (decapitation) while sleeping in his tent at Bukhara (modern Uzbekistan) by some of his slaves. He is succeeded by his 8-year-old son, Nasr II, under the regency of Vizier Abu Abdallah al-Jayhani. The Abbasids try, in vain, to benefit from the turmoil to reconquer Sistan.
- Sajid invasion of Georgia: A Muslim army under Yusuf ibn Abi'l-Saj campaigns in the Georgian principalities. He makes Tiflis his base for operations, and invades Kakheti. Yusuf proceeds to Kartli, where the fortifications of Uplistsikhe are demolished. He besieges and captures the fortress of Q'ueli, putting its defender Gobron to death.
- Hasan al-Utrush re-establishes Zaydid rule over the province Tabaristan (Northern Iran), after 14 years of Samanid occupation. He becomes the new ruler (emir) and Zaydid noblemen accept his authority.

====== Asia ======
- February 4 – The Belanjong pillar is established on Bali.
- In India Emperor Indra III of the Rashtrakuta Dynasty, a grandson of Krishna II, begins his rule (until 929).

==== By topic ====
====== Religion ======
- March or April – Pope Lando dies at Rome after a reign of less than a year. He is succeeded by John X, archbishop of Ravenna, as the 122nd pope of the Catholic Church.

=== 915 ===
==== By place ====
====== Europe ======
- Summer – Battle of Garigliano: The Christian League, personally led by Pope John X, lays siege to Garigliano (a fortified Arab camp in the area of Minturno), which is blockaded from the sea by the Byzantine navy. After three months of siege, plagued by hunger, the Saracens decide to break out of Garigliano and find their way back to Sicily by any means possible. Christian hunting parties fall on the fleeing Arabs, and all are captured and executed.
- July – The Magyars (Hungarians), led by Zoltán, only son of the late Grand Prince Árpád, attack Swabia, Franconia and Saxony. Small units penetrate as far as Bremen, burning the city.

==== By topic ====
====== Religion ======
- December 3 – John X crowns the Italian sovereign Berengar I as the Holy Roman Emperor in Rome. Berengar returns to northern Italy, where Friuli is threatened by the Hungarians.

=== 916 ===
==== By place ====
====== Europe ======
- Sicilian Berbers in Agrigento revolt and depose the independent Emir Ahmed ibn Khorob. They offer Sicily to the Fatimid Caliphate in Ifriqiya (modern Tunisia). Caliph Abdullah al-Mahdi Billah welcomes this turn of events, but refuses to grant the Berber rulers their autonomy. He sends a Fatimid expeditionary force under Abu Said Musa which lands in Sicily and, with some difficulty, takes control of the island. Abdullah al-Mahdi Billah appoints Salam ibn Rashid as the emir of Sicily. Ahmed ibn Khorob is dispatched to Raqqada and executed.

====== Britain ======
- Lady Æthelflæd, daughter of the late King Alfred the Great and the widow of Earl Æthelred of Mercia, sends an army into Brycheiniog to avenge the murder of the Mercian abbot Ecbryht and his companions. They seize and burn the royal fort of King Tewdr of Brycheiniog at Llangorse Lake (Wales), and take the queen and thirty-three others captive.

====== Asia ======
- Abaoji, Khitan ruler and founder of the Liao Dynasty, adopts Chinese court formalities in which he declares himself emperor in the Chinese style and adopts an era name, Taizu of Liao. He names his eldest son Yelü Bei as heir apparent, a first in the history of the Khitan. Abaoji leads a campaign in the west, conquering much of the Mongolian Plains.

==== By topic ====
====== Religion ======
- Clement of Ohrid, Bulgarian scholar, writer and enlightener of the Slavs, dies. He is regarded as the first bishop of the Bulgarian Orthodox Church and the founder of the first Slavic Literary School. Clement is buried in his monastery, Saint Panteleimon, in Ohrid (modern North Macedonia).

=== 917 ===
==== By place ====
====== Byzantine Empire ======
- August 20 – Battle of Achelous: A Byzantine expeditionary force (62,000 men) under General Leo Phokas (the Elder) is routed by the Bulgarians at the Achelous River near the fortress of Anchialos (modern Pomorie) on the Black Sea coast. Phokas flees to Mesembria (modern Nesebar) and escapes by boarding a ship. Tsar Simeon I (the Great) becomes de facto ruler of the whole Balkan Peninsula, except the well-protected Byzantine capital of Constantinople and the Peloponnese.
- Fall – Battle of Katasyrtai: The Bulgarian army under Simeon I marches southwards to Constantinople. Leo Phokas, who survived at Anchelous, gathers the last Byzantine troops to intercept the Bulgarians before they reach the capital. The two armies meet near the village of Katasyrtai, just outside Constantinople. After a surprise night attack, the Byzantines are completely routed from the battlefield.

====== Europe ======
- Bulgarian–Serbian War: Simeon I sends a Bulgarian expeditionary force under Theodore Sigritsa and Marmais to Serbia. The two persuade Petar Gojniković, a Serbian prince who formed an anti-Bulgarian coalition, to meet for a peace agreement. They seize him and send the rebellious prince to the Bulgarian capital of Preslav, where he dies in prison. Simeon replaces Petar with Pavle Branović, a grandson of prince Mutimir, who lives in Preslav. Serbia becomes a puppet state until 921.
- The Hungarians, after attacking Swabia, sack and burn Basel (modern Switzerland). They invade Lorraine in Lotharingia, destroying Verdun and Moyenmoutier, and many monasteries in Alsace. Duke Arnulf I (the Bad) with Hungarian military aid, reconquers his land from King Conrad I of the East Frankish Kingdom. After this event, Bavaria and Swabia agree to pay tribute to the Hungarians.
- Battle of Confey: The Norse Vikings under Sigtrygg Caech defeat and kill King Augaire mac Ailella of Leinster in battle. Sigtrygg re-captures Dublin and establishes himself as king, while his kinsman Ragnall ua Ímair returns to England to become King of Northumbria.

====== Britain ======
- Summer – Lady Æthelflæd of Mercia cements an alliance with King Constantine II of Scotland against Norse York. She captures the fortress at Derby (belonging to the Five Boroughs of the Danelaw), while her brother, King Edward the Elder, takes Towcester. Æthelflæd's armies also ravage Brycheiniog (Wales) in revenge for killing the Mercian abbot Ecbryht (see 916).
- Battle of Tempsford: The English army led by Edward the Elder defeats the Danish Vikings at Tempsford. They storm the fortified burh and kill King Guthrum II of East Anglia, along with the Danish Jarls Toglos and Manna.

====== Islamic Empire ======
- Battle of San Esteban de Gormaz: Umayyad forces under Abi-Abda besiege the repoblación of San Esteban de Gormaz (Northern Spain). King Ordoño II of León (supported by his brother Fruela II of Asturias) allies himself with Sancho I, king of Pamplona, and defeats the Moors. Abi-Abda is captured and executed by decapitation.

====== Asia ======
- September 5 – The Great Yue Kingdom, later renamed Southern Han, is founded by Liu Yan, former governor and military advisor, in Panyu (modern Guangdong) and Guangxi. Liu Yan declares himself emperor, and gives his niece Liu Hua in marriage to Wang Yanjun, a son of his rival Wang Shenzhi (Prince of Min), to cement a relationship between the two states.

=== 918 ===
==== By place ====
====== Europe ======
- December 23 – King Conrad I, injured at one of his battles with Arnulf I (the Bad), dies at his residence in Weilburg Castle after a 7-year reign. On his deathbed Conrad persuades his younger brother Eberhard III to offer the East Frankish crown to Henry the Fowler, the duke of Saxony. Conrad is buried in Fulda Cathedral (also the burial place of Boniface) in Germany.

====== Britain ======
- Battle of Corbridge: High-Reeve Ealdred I persuades King Constantine II of Scotland to help him reclaim his position in Bernicia. They mount an invasion of his now Norse controlled lands. The Vikings under Ragnall ua Ímair (or Rægnald) defeat the Scots and their allies at Corbridge (Northern Northumbria), but take heavy casualties themselves.
- Summer – Lady Æthelflæd of Mercia begins to intrigue with disaffected factions within the Norse Kingdom of York (also referred to as Jórvik). Mercian troops ravage the local countryside and peacefully overrun the fortress of Leicester (belonging to the Five Boroughs of the Danelaw), while her brother, King Edward the Elder, takes Stamford.
- June 12 – Æthelflæd dies at Tamworth while campaigning against the Vikings. She is buried with her husband Æthelred in St. Oswald's Priory at Gloucester. Æthelflæd is succeeded by her only daughter Ælfwynn.
- Kings Idwal Foel of Gwynedd and Hywel ap Cadell, and Prince Clydog of Deheubarth (Wales) submit to the overlordship of Edward the Elder. The Vikings raid Anglesey.

====== Asia ======
- July 25 – Wang Kon, a Korean general, overthrows the government of the short-lived state Ho Goguryeo and ascends the throne at Cheorwon. He founds the Goryeo dynasty and makes Song'ak his capital.
- Emperor Taizu of the Khitan Empire occupies a newly walled city called Shangjing (modern-day Inner Mongolia), meaning Supreme Capital. It becomes the residence of the Chinese Liao dynasty.

=== 919 ===
==== By Place ====
====== Byzantine Empire ======
- March 25 – Romanos Lekapenos, admiral (droungarios) of the Byzantine navy, seizes the Boukoleon Palace in Constantinople. He is named megas hetaireiarches (head of the imperial guard). Lekapenos consolidates his position and becomes regent of Emperor Constantine VII. He marries his 9-year-old daughter Helena Lekapene to Constantine and assumes the new title of basileopator (one of the highest offices in the Byzantine Empire).

====== Europe ======
- May 24 – The nobles of Franconia and Saxony elect Henry the Fowler at the Imperial Diet in Fritzlar as ruler of the East Frankish Kingdom. He recognizes the stem duchies (uniting them in a German confederation) and all their sovereign privileges. Two of the four most influential duchies, Bavaria and Swabia, do not accept his rule. Henry fortifies Magdeburg against the Magyars.
- Summer – Arnulf, Duke of Bavaria ("the Bad"), is elected as anti-king by the East-Frankish nobles in opposition to Henry I. Burchard II, duke of Swabia, submits to Henry's rule — allowing him to retain administrative control over his duchy. After an absence of nearly 15 years, the Magyars raid Bavaria and Northern Italy again, sacking the Po Valley (see Hungarian invasions of Europe).
- September 14 – Battle of Islandbridge: High King Niall Glúndub is killed while leading an Irish coalition against the Dublin-based Vikings of Uí Ímair, led by King Sitric Cáech.

====== Britain ======
- Lady Ælfwynn of the Mercians is brought to the court of her uncle, King Edward the Elder, and deprived of her authority in Mercia. Edward formally annexes the kingdom, ending independent Mercian rule.
- Ragnall ua Ímair, a Viking chief from Ireland, takes control of the Norse Kingdom of York (also referred to as Jórvik) and the English-ruled Earldom of Northumbria. He establishes himself as king at York.

====== Africa ======
- April 5 – The Fatimid Caliphate of Ifriqiya (modern-day Tunisia) launch the second Fatimid invasion of Egypt (919–921) in an attempt to seize Egypt from its Abbasid rulers. The expedition fails and the Fatimids will be forced to retreat.
- Following his death, Mara Takla Haymanot is succeeded by his eldest son Tatadim as ruler (negus) of the Zagwe Dynasty in Ethiopia.

====== China ======
- Battle of Langshan Jiang: The Wuyue navy (500 dragon ships) under Prince Qian Yuanguan who is preparing an invasion to attack the Wu Kingdom, defeats the naval forces of General Peng Yanzhang on the Yangtze River. Due to the use of flamethrower ships (using gunpowder to ignite petrol, like Greek fire) Qian Yuanguan manages to destroy 400 enemy ships and captures 7,000 prisoners.

====== Mesoamerica ======
- The Ancestral Puebloans, living in the Four Corners, begin construction at Pueblo Bonito, in modern-day New Mexico's Chaco Canyon (approximate date).

==== By topic ====
====== Religion ======
- The Bulgarian Orthodox Church is declared as autocephalous and elevated to the rank of patriarchate at an ecclesiastical council.

== Significant people ==
- Al-Ash'ari
- Al-Muqtadir Abbasid caliph
- Leo VI of Byzantium

== Births ==
910

- Adalbert, archbishop of Magdeburg (approximate date)
- Eadgyth, Anglo-Saxon princess and queen of Germany (d. 946)
- Fernán González, count of Castile (approximate date)
- Fujiwara no Asatada, Japanese nobleman (d. 966)
- Gamle Eirikssen, Norwegian Viking ruler (d. 955)
- Gunnhild, Norwegian Viking queen (approximate date)
- Hedwig of Saxony, Frankish noblewoman and regent (d. 965)
- Helena Lekapene, Byzantine empress (approximate date)
- Herbert III, Frankish nobleman (approximate date)
- John XI, pope of the Catholic Church (d. 935)
- Ma Yize, Muslim astronomer (approximate date)
- Minamoto no Saneakira, Japanese nobleman (d. 970)
- Nilus the Younger, Byzantine abbot (d. 1005)
- Oda of Metz, German noblewoman (d. 963)
- Sahl ben Matzliah, Jewish philosopher (d. 990)
- Yan Xu, Chinese chancellor (d. 967)

911

- Hassan ibn Ali Kalbi, Fatimid emir (d. 964)
- Fan Zhi, chancellor of the Song dynasty (d. 964)
- Gozlin, count of the Ardennes
- Minamoto no Shitagō, Japanese waka poet (d. 983)
- Willa of Tuscany, queen consort of Italy (or 912)
- Yelü Lihu, prince of the Khitan Empire (d. 960)

912

- November 23 – Otto I, emperor of the Holy Roman Empire (d. 973)
- Alberic II, princeps and duke of Spoleto (d. 954)
- Frederick I, duke of Upper Lorraine (approximate date)
- Hyejong, king of Goryeo (Korea) (d. 945)
- Ma Xichong, governor and ruler of Chu (d. 951)
- Minamoto no Mitsunaka, Japanese nobleman and samurai (d. 997)
- Nakatsukasa, Japanese waka poet (d. 991)
- Nikephoros II, emperor of the Byzantine Empire (d. 969)
- Pelagius of Córdoba, Christian martyr (d. 926)
- Ryōgen, Japanese monk and abbot (d. 985)
- Willa of Tuscany, queen consort of Italy (or 911)
- Xue Juzheng, Chinese scholar-official and historian (d. 981)

913

- al-Mansur bi-Nasr Allah, Fatimid caliph (d. 953)
- Gerberga, Frankish queen and regent (approximate date)
- Shabbethai Donnolo, Jewish physician (d. 982)
- Theobald I, Frankish nobleman (d. 975)
- Wu Hanyue, Chinese noblewoman (d. 952)

914

- Al-Muti, Abbasid caliph (d. 974)
- Chen Hongjin, Chinese warlord (d. 985)
- Li Conghou, emperor of Later Tang (d. 934)
- Luitgarde, duchess consort of Normandy (d. 978)
- Shi Chonggui, emperor of Later Jin (d. 974)
- Valtoke Gormsson, Viking nobleman (d. 985)

915

- January 13 – Al-Hakam II, Umayyad caliph (d. 976)
- Abu Shakur Balkhi, Persian poet
- Adalbert I, Frankish nobleman (approximate date)
- Al-Mutanabbi, Muslim poet (d. 965)
- Boleslaus I, duke of Bohemia (approximate date)
- Burchard III, Frankish nobleman (d. 973)
- Hasdai ibn Shaprut, Jewish diplomat (d. 970)
- Sunifred II, Frankish nobleman (d. 968)
- William III, Frankish nobleman (d. 963)

916

- June 22 – Sayf al-Dawla, Hamdanid emir (d. 967)
- Theodoric I, German nobleman (approximate date)
- Yuan Zong, emperor of Southern Tang (d. 961)

917

- September 20 – Kyunyeo, Korean poet (d. 973)
- Ibn Battah al-Ukbari, Arab theologian (d. 997)
- Kamo no Yasunori, Japanese spiritual advisor (d. 977)
- Theophylactus, patriarch of Constantinople (d. 956)

918

- Minamoto no Hiromasa, Japanese nobleman (d. 980)

919

- January 29 – Shi Zong, emperor of the Liao Dynasty (d. 951)
- García I, king of Pamplona (d. 970)
- Li Cheng, Chinese painter (d. 967)
- Meng Chang, emperor of Later Shu (d. 965)
- Xu Jingqian, official and regent of Wu (d. 937)
- Theinhko, king of the Pagan dynasty (d. 956)

== Deaths ==
910

- January 26 – Luo Yin, Chinese statesman and poet
- June 2 – Richilde of Provence, Frankish empress
- June 22
  - Gebhard, Frankish nobleman
  - Gerhard I, Frankish nobleman
- July 4 – Luo Shaowei, Chinese warlord (b. 877)
- July 31 – Feng Xingxi, Chinese warlord
- August 5
  - Eowils and Halfdan, kings of Northumbria
  - Ingwær, king of Northumbria
- December 20 – Alfonso III, king of Asturias
- December 23 – Naum of Preslav, Bulgarian writer
- Adelin, bishop of Séez (approximate date)
- Andronikos Doukas, Byzantine general (approximate date)
- Atenulf I (the Great), Lombard prince
- Eustathios Argyros, Byzantine general
- Isa al-Nushari, Abbasid governor
- Ishaq ibn Hunayn, Abbasid physician (or 911)
- Junayd Baghdadi, Persian Sufi mystic (b. 835)
- Liu Shouwen, Chinese warlord and governor
- Lu Guangchou, Chinese warlord
- Mahendrapala I, king of Gurjara-Pratihara (India)
- Muhammad ibn Tahir, Abbasid governor
- Muncimir, duke (knyaz) of Croatia
- Sosei, Japanese waka poet (b. 844)
- Wei Zhuang, Chinese poet (b. 836)
- Yasovarman I, ruler of the Angkor Empire

911

- February 28 – Abu Abdallah al-Shi'i, Muslim Shia missionary
- April 4 – Liu Yin, governor of Southern Han (b. 874)
- April 14 – Sergius III, pope of the Catholic Church
- August 18 – Al-Hadi ila'l-Haqq Yahya, first Zaydi Imam of Yemen (b. 859)
- Æthelred, lord of Mercia and husband of Æthelflæd
- Burchard I, Frankish nobleman
- Ibn al-Rawandi, Muslim scholar and writer (b. 827)
- Louis IV, king of the East Frankish Kingdom (b. 893)
- Lu Yanchang, Chinese governor (jiedushi)
- Tecpancaltzin Iztaccaltzin, ruler of the Toltec Empire
- Wifred II, count of Barcelona

912

- May 11 – Leo VI, emperor of the Byzantine Empire (b. 866)
- May 25 – Xue Yiju, chancellor of Later Liang
- July 18 – Zhu Wen, emperor of Later Liang (b. 852)
- August 15 – Han Jian, Chinese warlord (b. 855)
- October 15 – Abdullah ibn Muhammad, Muslim emir (b. 844)
- October 25 – Rudolph I, king of Burgundy (b. 859)
- November 30 – Otto I, duke of Saxony
- Ahmad ibn Yusuf, Muslim mathematician (b. 835)
- Guanxiu, Chinese Buddhist monk and poet (b. 832)
- Hermenegildo Gutiérrez, Galician nobleman
- Hyogong, king of Silla (Korea) (b. 885)
- Ibn Khordadbeh, Persian geographer
- Notker the Stammerer, Benedictine monk
- Oleg of Novgorod, Varangian prince
- Pietro Tribuno, doge of Venice (approximate date)
- Qusta ibn Luqa, Syrian Melkite physician (b. 820)
- Rudalt, Breton nobleman (approximate date)
- Smbat I, king of Armenia (approximate date)
- Wilferth, bishop of Lichfield (approximate date)
- Zhang Ce, chancellor of Later Liang
- Zhu Youwen, prince of Later Liang

913

- March 27
  - Du Xiao, chancellor of Later Liang
  - Zhang, empress of Later Liang
- May 15 – Hatto I, archbishop of Mainz
- June 6 – Alexander III, Byzantine emperor (b. 870)
- June/July – Abu Sa'id al-Jannabi, founder of the Qarmatian state in Bahrayn (assassinated)
- August 21 – Tang Daoxi, Chinese general
- Anastasius III, pope of the Catholic Church
- Cheng Ji, Chinese general and strategist
- Constantine Doukas, Byzantine general
- Eadwulf II, ruler (high-reeve) of Northumbria
- Li Yantu, ruler of Qian Prefecture
- Torpaid mac Taicthech, Irish poet
- Ubaydallah ibn Abdallah, Tahirid governor
- Wang Yuanying, Chinese prince (b. 892)
- Zhu Yougui, emperor of Later Liang

914

- January 12 – Ahmad Samani, Samanid emir
- January 19 – García I, king of León (Spain)
- February 12 – Li, empress of Yan
- December 31 – Ibn Hawshab, founder of the Isma'ili community in Yemen
- Abu Sa'id al-Jannabi, founder of Bahrain (or 913)
- Aedh mac Ailell, abbot of Clonfert
- Bárid mac Oitir, Viking leader
- Gobron, Georgian military commander
- Idalguer, Frankish bishop
- John Eladas, Byzantine regent
- Krishna II, Indian ruler
- Lando, pope of the Catholic Church
- Li Jihui, Chinese governor
- Liu Rengong, Chinese warlord
- Liu Shouguang, Chinese warlord
- Mu'nis al-Fahl, Abbasid general
- Plegmund, archbishop of Canterbury (or 923)

915

- April 23 – Yang Shihou, Chinese general
- November 4 – Zhang, Chinese empress (b. 892)
- Abu Salih Mansur, Samanid governor
- Adalbert II, Lombard nobleman
- Al-Nasa'i, Muslim scholar and hadith compiler
- Bi'dah al-Kabirah, was a songstress, and had been a slave of Arib. She died on 10 July 915. Abu Bakr ibn al-Muhtadi led the funeral prayers. She was also concubine of Abbasid caliph Al-Mamūn (r. 813–833)
- Bertila of Spoleto, queen of Italy
- Cutheard, bishop of Lindisfarne
- Domnall mac Áeda, king of Ailech (Ireland)
- Gonzalo Fernandez, count of Castile
- Gregory IV, duke of Naples
- Jing Hao, Chinese painter
- Leoluca, Sicilian abbot (approximate date)
- Li Yanlu, Chinese warlord
- Ratbod, archbishop of Trier
- Reginar I, Frankish nobleman
- Regino of Prüm, German abbot
- Spytihněv I, duke of Bohemia
- Sunyer II, Frankish nobleman
- Tuotilo, German composer (approximate date)

916

- March 27 – Alduin I, Frankish nobleman
- May 25 – Flann Sinna, king of Meath
- Anarawd ap Rhodri, king of Gwynedd
- Bencion, Frankish nobleman
- Clement of Ohrid, Bulgarian scholar
- Ge Congzhou, Chinese general
- Mór ingen Cearbhaill, queen of Laigin
- Tighearnach ua Cleirigh, king of Aidhne
- Theodora, Roman politician
- Theodoric I, bishop of Paderborn
- Ziyadat Allah III, Aghlabid emir

917

- January 21 – Erchanger, East Frankish nobleman
- August 5 – Euthymius I, patriarch of Constantinople
- August 20 – Constantine Lips, Byzantine admiral
- Al-'Abbas ibn 'Amr al-Ghanawi, Abbasid governor
- Augaire mac Ailella, king of Leinster (Ireland)
- Frederuna, West Frankish queen (b. 887)
- Guthrum II, king of East Anglia (England)
- Hasan al-Utrush, emir of Tabaristan (Iran)
- Nicholas Picingli, Byzantine general
- Petar Gojniković, Serbian prince
- Radboud, archbishop of Utrecht
- Sindeok, king of Silla (Korea)

918

- January 21 – Liu Zhijun, Chinese general
- June 12 – Æthelflæd, lady of Mercia (b. c.870)
- July 6 – William I, duke of Aquitaine (b. 875)
- September 10 – Baldwin II, Frankish margrave
- October 1 – Zhou, empress of Former Shu
- December 23 – Conrad I, Frankish king
- Gung Ye, king of Hu Goguryeo (Korea)
- Husayn ibn Hamdan, Abbasid general
- Lady Ren Neiming, Chinese noblewoman (b. 865)
- Miyoshi Kiyotsura, Japanese scholar (b. 847)
- Ottir (the Black), Norse Viking chieftain
- Tan Quanbo, Chinese warlord (approximate date)
- Wang Jian, emperor of Former Shu (b. 847)
- Xu Zhixun, Chinese governor and regent
- Zhu Jin, Chinese warlord (b. 867)

919

- January 28 – Zhou Dewei, Chinese general
- August 11 – Dhuka al-Rumi, Abbasid governor of Egypt
- August 28 – He Gui, Chinese general (b. 858)
- September 14 – Niall Glúndub, High King of Ireland
- December 18 – Lady Wu, wife of Qian Liu (b. 858)
- Justan III, ruler of the Justanid Dynasty (Iran)
- Khusrau Firuz, ruler of the Justanid Dynasty
- Mara Takla Haymanot, ruler of Ethiopia
- Solomon III, bishop of Constance
