= 913 =

Calendar year

913 in various calendars
Gregorian calendar	913; CMXIII
Ab urbe condita	1666
Armenian calendar	362; ԹՎ ՅԿԲ
Assyrian calendar	5663
Balinese saka calendar	834–835
Bengali calendar	319–320
Berber calendar	1863
Buddhist calendar	1457
Burmese calendar	275
Byzantine calendar	6421–6422
Chinese calendar	壬申年 (Water Monkey); 3610 or 3403 — to — 癸酉年 (Water Rooster); 3611 or 3404
Coptic calendar	629–630
Discordian calendar	2079
Ethiopian calendar	905–906
Hebrew calendar	4673–4674
- Hindu calendars
Vikram Samvat	969–970
Shaka Samvat	834–835
Kali Yuga	4013–4014
Holocene calendar	10913
Iranian calendar	291–292
Islamic calendar	300–301
Japanese calendar	Engi 13 (延喜１３年)
Javanese calendar	812–813
Julian calendar	913; CMXIII
Korean calendar	3246
Minguo calendar	999 before ROC 民前999年
Nanakshahi calendar	−555
Seleucid era	1224/1225 AG
Thai solar calendar	1455–1456
Tibetan calendar	阳水猴年 (male Water-Monkey); 1039 or 658 or −114 — to — 阴水鸡年 (female Water-Rooster); 1040 or 659 or −113

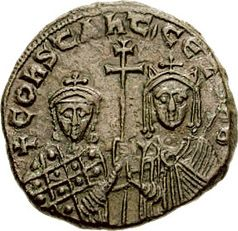
Empress Zoe and Constantine VII

Year 913 (CMXIII) was a common year starting on Friday of the Julian calendar.

== Events ==
=== By place ===
==== Byzantine Empire ====
- June 6 – Emperor Alexander III dies of exhaustion while playing the game tzykanion (Byzantine name for polo). He is succeeded by his 8-year-old nephew Constantine VII Porphyrogennetos ("born in the purple"), a son of the late emperor Leo VI (the Wise). The government is administered by a regency council composed of Constantine's mother, Empress Zoe Karbonopsina, Patriarch Nicholas Mystikos and his guardian John Eladas.
- August – Byzantine–Bulgarian War: Simeon I (the Great), ruler (knyaz) of the Bulgarian Empire, launches a campaign at the head of a large Bulgarian army, and reaches Constantinople unopposed. The Bulgarians besiege the Byzantine capital and construct ditches from the Golden Horn to the Golden Gate at the Marmara Sea. After negotiations the siege is lifted and Simeon is recognised as emperor of the Bulgarians.
- Summer – Constantine Doukas, a Byzantine general (magister militum), tries, unsuccessfully, with the support of several aristocrats to usurp the throne from the young Constantine VII. He is killed in a clash by the soldiers of the Hetaireia guard, assembled by John Eladas. His head is cut off and presented to Constantine.

==== Europe ====
- Battle of the Inn: The Hungarians invade Bavaria, Swabia and Northern Burgundy. At their return they face the combined armies of Arnulf (duke of Bavaria), Erchanger and Burchard II (dukes of Swabia), who defeat them at Aschbach near the Inn River (modern Germany).

==== Britain ====
- King Edward the Elder begins with the 'reconquest' of the Danelaw and occupies Essex. Death of High-Reeve Eadwulf II. He is succeeded by his son Ealdred I, who is almost immediately driven out by King Ragnall ua Ímair of Norse York. Ealdred flees to the court of King Constantine II of Scotland.

==== Arabian Empire ====
- Caliph Abdullah al-Mahdi Billah of the Fatimid Caliphate replaces the unpopular governor Ibn Abi Khinzir with Ali ibn Umar al-Balawi. But the Sicilian lords find this unacceptable and decide to declare independence of Sicily. They acknowledge allegiance to the Abbasid caliph Al-Muqtadir and acclaim an Aghlabid prince, Ahmed ibn Khorob, as emir of Sicily. The Sicilians re-launch their conquest of Byzantine Calabria, while Ahmed ibn Khorob in Sicily leads a successful assault against the North African cities of Sfax and Tripoli.

=== By topic ===
==== Religion ====
- Summer – Pope Anastasius III dies at Rome after a 2-year reign. He is succeeded by Lando as the 121st pope of the Catholic Church.
- San Miguel de Escalada is built in León (Northern Spain) by orders of King García I (approximate date).

== Births ==
- al-Mansur bi-Nasr Allah, Fatimid caliph (d. 953)
- Gerberga, Frankish queen and regent (approximate date)
- Shabbethai Donnolo, Jewish physician (d. 982)
- Theobald I, Frankish nobleman (d. 975)
- Wu Hanyue, Chinese noblewoman (d. 952)

== Deaths ==
- March 27
  - Du Xiao, chancellor of Later Liang
  - Zhang, empress of Later Liang
- May 15 – Hatto I, archbishop of Mainz
- June 6 – Alexander III, Byzantine emperor (b. 870)
- June/July – Abu Sa'id al-Jannabi, founder of the Qarmatian state in Bahrayn (assassinated)
- August 21 – Tang Daoxi, Chinese general
- Anastasius III, pope of the Catholic Church
- Cheng Ji, Chinese general and strategist
- Constantine Doukas, Byzantine general
- Eadwulf II, ruler (high-reeve) of Northumbria
- Li Yantu, ruler of Qian Prefecture
- Torpaid mac Taicthech, Irish poet
- Ubaydallah ibn Abdallah, Tahirid governor
- Wang Yuanying, Chinese prince (b. 892)
- Zhu Yougui, emperor of Later Liang
