= 914 =

Calendar year

914 in various calendars
- Gregorian calendar: 914; CMXIV
- Ab urbe condita: 1667
- Armenian calendar: 363; ԹՎ ՅԿԳ
- Assyrian calendar: 5664
- Balinese saka calendar: 835–836
- Bengali calendar: 320–321
- Berber calendar: 1864
- Buddhist calendar: 1458
- Burmese calendar: 276
- Byzantine calendar: 6422–6423
- Chinese calendar: 癸酉年 (Water Rooster); 3611 or 3404 — to — 甲戌年 (Wood Dog); 3612 or 3405
- Coptic calendar: 630–631
- Discordian calendar: 2080
- Ethiopian calendar: 906–907
- Hebrew calendar: 4674–4675
- Hindu calendars
- Vikram Samvat: 970–971
- Shaka Samvat: 835–836
- Kali Yuga: 4014–4015
- Holocene calendar: 10914
- Iranian calendar: 292–293
- Islamic calendar: 301–302
- Japanese calendar: Engi 14 (延喜１４年)
- Javanese calendar: 813–814
- Julian calendar: 914; CMXIV
- Korean calendar: 3247
- Minguo calendar: 998 before ROC 民前998年
- Nanakshahi calendar: −554
- Seleucid era: 1225/1226 AG
- Thai solar calendar: 1456–1457
- Tibetan calendar: ཆུ་མོ་བྱ་ལོ་ (female Water-Bird); 1040 or 659 or −113 — to — ཤིང་ཕོ་ཁྱི་ལོ་ (male Wood-Dog); 1041 or 660 or −112

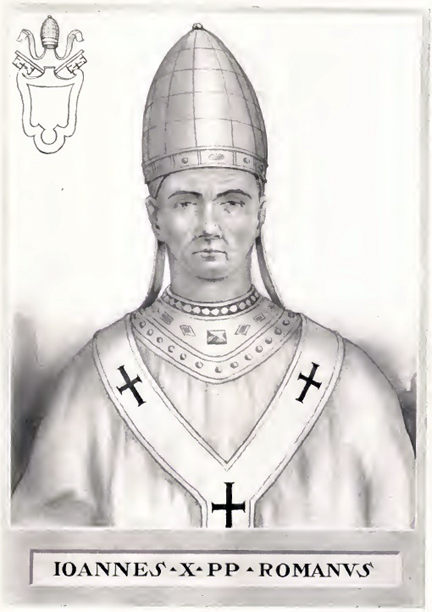
Pope John X (r. 914–928)

Year 914 (CMXIV) was a common year starting on Saturday of the Julian calendar.

== Events ==
=== By place ===
==== Byzantine Empire ====
- Spring – Empress Zoe Karbonopsina leads a palace coup at Constantinople and, with the support of the magistros John Eladas, overthrows Patriarch Nicholas Mystikos as regent over her son, Emperor Constantine VII. She allows Nicholas to remain as patriarch, repudiates the title granted to Simeon I of Bulgaria (see 913) and nullifies the marriage plans (with a Bulgarian princess) made for her son by Nicholas.
- Summer – Byzantine–Bulgarian War: Simeon I, with the Bulgarian army, invades the themes of Thrace and Macedonia. Simultaneously, the Bulgarian troops penetrate into the regions of Dyrrhachium and Thessalonica to the west. Thrace's largest and most important city, Adrianople (modern Turkey), is besieged and captured. However, the Byzantines promptly regain the city in exchange for a huge ransom.

==== Europe ====
- January 19 – King García I dies at Zamora (Spain) after a 4-year reign. He is succeeded by his brother Ordoño II, who becomes king of Galicia and León. Ordoño continues his expansion and settles his court in León.
- Summer – Saracens from Garigliano establish advanced strongholds in Lazio at Trevi (in the Sabine Hills, near Palestrina) and Sutri. From here, they encroach on the papal cities of Orte, Narni and Nepi with impunity.
- Viking raiders establish a settlement near Waterford (Ireland) led by Ottir (the Black). The Dublin Vikings are forced to pay tribute to the Irish kings of Meath and Leinster as the price to keeping their independence.
- In Al-Andalus a drought leads to a terrible famine in the Iberian Peninsula, which continues in 915. In his centralization effort, the Umayyad caliph Abd al-Rahman III, reconquers Seville from the Banu Hajjaj clan.

==== Britain ====
- Vikings devastate the Welsh coast and move up the Severn River. They capture Bishop Cyfeilliog of Ergyng, and he is ransomed by King Edward the Elder. The Vikings are defeated by levies from Hereford and Gloucester.
- Æthelflæd, Lady of the Mercians, a daughter of King Alfred the Great, builds a burh or fortified dwelling at Warwick and repairs Eddisbury hill fort. She leads the Mercians in their fight against the Danish invaders.

==== Africa ====
- January 24 – The Fatimid general, Hubasa ibn Yusuf of the Kutama Berber tribe, marches out with his troops to invade Egypt. He follows the coastline, and takes possession of the only two towns of any size Syrte and Ajdabiya, without a struggle. The garrisons of the two towns—the westernmost outposts of the Abbasid Caliphate—have already fled.
- February 6 – Hubasa takes Barqah (modern-day Benghazi), the ancient capital of Cyrenaica. The Abbasid governor withdraws to Egypt, before the superior strength of the Fatimids. With this rich, fertile province fallen into his hands, it provides Hubāsa with 24,000 gold dinars in annual revenues from taxes, as well as 15,000 dinars paid by Christians.
- July 11 – Al-Qa'im bi-Amr Allah, son of the Fatimid caliph Abdullah al-Mahdi Billah, leaves Raqqada at the head of an army, which is composed of Kutama warriors and the Arab jund (personal guard) in an attempt to conquer Egypt. He sends orders to Hubāsa to wait for him, but driven by ambition Hubāsa is already on his way to Alexandria.
- August 27 – Hubasa captures Alexandria, after a victorious encounter with Egyptian troops near al-Hanniyya (modern-day El Alamein). The Abbasid governor Takin al-Khazari refuses to surrender and asks for reinforcements, which reach him in September. Shortly after al-Qa'im bi-Amr Allah enters Alexandria, with the rest of his army.
- December – The Fatimid army under Hubasa leaves Alexandria, followed by al-Qa'im bi-Amr Allah. The Abbasid troops hold Fustat and begin a counter-offensive against the invaders. The Kutama cavalry suffers heavy losses to the Turkish archers.

==== Arabian Empire ====
- January 12 – Ahmad Samani, emir of the Samanid Empire, is murdered (decapitation) while sleeping in his tent at Bukhara (modern Uzbekistan) by some of his slaves. He is succeeded by his 8-year-old son, Nasr II, under the regency of Vizier Abu Abdallah al-Jayhani. The Abbasids try, in vain, to benefit from the turmoil to reconquer Sistan.
- Sajid invasion of Georgia: A Muslim army under Yusuf ibn Abi'l-Saj campaigns in the Georgian principalities. He makes Tiflis his base for operations, and invades Kakheti. Yusuf proceeds to Kartli, where the fortifications of Uplistsikhe are demolished. He besieges and captures the fortress of Q'ueli, putting its defender Gobron to death.
- Hasan al-Utrush re-establishes Zaydid rule over the province Tabaristan (Northern Iran), after 14 years of Samanid occupation. He becomes the new ruler (emir) and Zaydid noblemen accept his authority.

==== Asia ====
- February 4 – The Belanjong pillar is established on Bali.
- In India Emperor Indra III of the Rashtrakuta Dynasty, a grandson of Krishna II, begins his rule (until 929).

=== By topic ===
==== Religion ====
- March or April – Pope Lando dies at Rome after a reign of less than a year. He is succeeded by John X, archbishop of Ravenna, as the 122nd pope of the Catholic Church.

== Births ==
- Al-Muti, Abbasid caliph (d. 974)
- Chen Hongjin, Chinese warlord (d. 985)
- Li Conghou, emperor of Later Tang (d. 934)
- Luitgarde, duchess consort of Normandy (d. 978)
- Shi Chonggui, emperor of Later Jin (d. 974)
- Valtoke Gormsson, Viking nobleman (d. 985)

== Deaths ==
- January 12 – Ahmad Samani, Samanid emir
- January 19 – García I, king of León (Spain)
- February 12 – Li, empress of Yan
- December 31 – Ibn Hawshab, founder of the Isma'ili community in Yemen
- Abu Sa'id al-Jannabi, founder of Bahrain (or 913)
- Aedh mac Ailell, abbot of Clonfert
- Bárid mac Oitir, Viking leader
- Gobron, Georgian military commander
- Idalguer, Frankish bishop
- John Eladas, Byzantine regent
- Krishna II, Indian ruler
- Lando, pope of the Catholic Church
- Li Jihui, Chinese governor
- Liu Rengong, Chinese warlord
- Liu Shouguang, Chinese warlord
- Mu'nis al-Fahl, Abbasid general
- Plegmund, archbishop of Canterbury (or 923)
