= AD 911 =

Calendar year

911 in various calendars
- Gregorian calendar: 911; CMXI
- Ab urbe condita: 1664
- Armenian calendar: 360; ԹՎ ՅԿ
- Assyrian calendar: 5661
- Balinese saka calendar: 832–833
- Bengali calendar: 317–318
- Berber calendar: 1861
- Buddhist calendar: 1455
- Burmese calendar: 273
- Byzantine calendar: 6419–6420
- Chinese calendar: 庚午年 (Metal Horse); 3608 or 3401 — to — 辛未年 (Metal Goat); 3609 or 3402
- Coptic calendar: 627–628
- Discordian calendar: 2077
- Ethiopian calendar: 903–904
- Hebrew calendar: 4671–4672
- Hindu calendars
- Vikram Samvat: 967–968
- Shaka Samvat: 832–833
- Kali Yuga: 4011–4012
- Holocene calendar: 10911
- Iranian calendar: 289–290
- Islamic calendar: 298–299
- Japanese calendar: Engi 11 (延喜１１年)
- Javanese calendar: 810–811
- Julian calendar: 911; CMXI
- Korean calendar: 3244
- Minguo calendar: 1001 before ROC 民前1001年
- Nanakshahi calendar: −557
- Seleucid era: 1222/1223 AG
- Thai solar calendar: 1453–1454
- Tibetan calendar: ལྕགས་ཕོ་རྟ་ལོ་ (male Iron-Horse); 1037 or 656 or −116 — to — ལྕགས་མོ་ལུག་ལོ་ (female Iron-Sheep); 1038 or 657 or −115

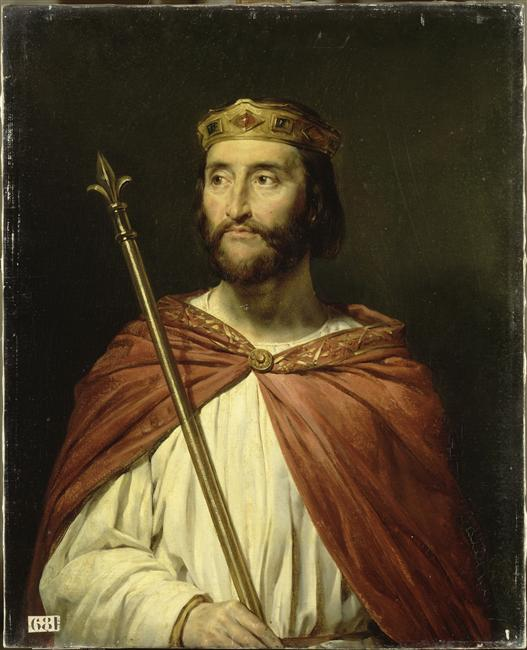
King Charles III (the Simple) (879–929)

911 (CMXI) was a common year starting on Tuesday of the Julian calendar.

== Events ==
=== By place ===
==== Europe ====
- September 24 – King Louis IV (the Child), the last Carolingian ruler of the East Frankish Kingdom, dies at Frankfurt am Main after an 11-year reign. The East Frankish dukes elect Conrad I at Forchheim as the king of the East Frankish Kingdom. Charles III is elected as king of Lotharingia. Conrad is chosen through the influence of Louis' guardian and regent, Hatto I, archbishop of Mainz.
- Autumn – King Charles III (the Simple) and Rollo, leader of the Vikings, sign a peace agreement (Treaty of Saint-Clair-sur-Epte). In return for his homage and conversion to Christianity, Rollo becomes a vassal and is made Count of Rouen; this is the beginning of the duchy of Normandy. He divides the lands between the rivers Epte and Risle among his chieftains, and prevents any other Vikings sailing up the Seine to attack the West Frankish Kingdom.
- The Hungarians cross Bavaria, and invade Swabia and Franconia. They plunder the territories from Minfeld to Aargau. After that, they cross the Rhine, and attack Burgundy for the first time.
- The Fatimids begin the conquest of Sicily, over their Aghlabid archrivals. Fatimid Sicilian governor Ibn al-Khinzir raids the south Italian coast (approximate date).

==== Britain ====
- Lord Æthelred of Mercia dies. He is buried in St. Oswald's Priory at Gloucester and is succeeded by his wife, Princess Æthelflæd, as Lady of the Mercians. Her brother, King Edward the Elder, insists on taking control of London and Oxford.

==== Africa ====
- A rebellion of the Kutama Berbers against the Fatimid Caliphate occurs. The Kutama tribesmen were previously the main supporters of the Shia regime.

=== By topic ===
==== Religion ====
- April 14 – Pope Sergius III dies at Rome after a 7-year reign. He is succeeded by Anastasius III as the 120th pope of the Catholic Church.

== Births ==
- Hassan ibn Ali Kalbi, Fatimid emir (d. 964)
- Fan Zhi, chancellor of the Song dynasty (d. 964)
- Gozlin, count of the Ardennes
- Minamoto no Shitagō, Japanese waka poet (d. 983)
- Willa of Tuscany, queen consort of Italy (or 912)
- Yelü Lihu, prince of the Khitan Empire (d. 960)

== Deaths ==
- February 28 – Abu Abdallah al-Shi'i, Muslim Shia missionary
- April 4 – Liu Yin, governor of Southern Han (b. 874)
- April 14 – Sergius III, pope of the Catholic Church
- August 18 – Al-Hadi ila'l-Haqq Yahya, first Zaydi Imam of Yemen (b. 859)
- Æthelred, lord of Mercia and husband of Æthelflæd
- Burchard I, Frankish nobleman
- Ibn al-Rawandi, Muslim scholar and writer (b. 827)
- Louis IV, king of the East Frankish Kingdom (b. 893)
- Lu Yanchang, Chinese governor (jiedushi)
- Tecpancaltzin Iztaccaltzin, ruler of the Toltec Empire
- Wifred II, count of Barcelona
