= 918 =

Calendar year

918 in various calendars
Gregorian calendar	918; CMXVIII
Ab urbe condita	1671
Armenian calendar	367; ԹՎ ՅԿԷ
Assyrian calendar	5668
Balinese saka calendar	839–840
Bengali calendar	324–325
Berber calendar	1868
Buddhist calendar	1462
Burmese calendar	280
Byzantine calendar	6426–6427
Chinese calendar	丁丑年 (Fire Ox); 3615 or 3408 — to — 戊寅年 (Earth Tiger); 3616 or 3409
Coptic calendar	634–635
Discordian calendar	2084
Ethiopian calendar	910–911
Hebrew calendar	4678–4679
- Hindu calendars
Vikram Samvat	974–975
Shaka Samvat	839–840
Kali Yuga	4018–4019
Holocene calendar	10918
Iranian calendar	296–297
Islamic calendar	305–306
Japanese calendar	Engi 18 (延喜１８年)
Javanese calendar	817–818
Julian calendar	918; CMXVIII
Korean calendar	3251
Minguo calendar	994 before ROC 民前994年
Nanakshahi calendar	−550
Seleucid era	1229/1230 AG
Thai solar calendar	1460–1461
Tibetan calendar	མེ་མོ་གླང་ལོ་ (female Fire-Ox); 1044 or 663 or −109 — to — ས་ཕོ་སྟག་ལོ་ (male Earth-Tiger); 1045 or 664 or −108

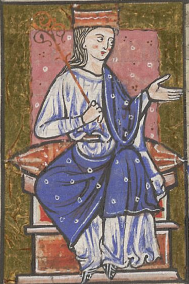
Lady Æthelflæd of Mercia

Year 918 (CMXVIII) was a common year starting on Thursday of the Julian calendar.

== Events ==
=== By place ===
==== Europe ====
- December 23 – King Conrad I, injured at one of his battles with Arnulf I (the Bad), dies at his residence in Weilburg Castle after a 7-year reign. On his deathbed Conrad persuades his younger brother Eberhard III to offer the East Frankish crown to Henry the Fowler, the duke of Saxony. Conrad is buried in Fulda Cathedral (also the burial place of Boniface) in Germany.

==== Britain ====
- Battle of Corbridge: High-Reeve Ealdred I persuades King Constantine II of Scotland to help him reclaim his position in Bernicia. They mount an invasion of his now Norse controlled lands. The Vikings under Ragnall ua Ímair (or Rægnald) defeat the Scots and their allies at Corbridge (Northern Northumbria), but take heavy casualties themselves.
- Summer – Lady Æthelflæd of Mercia begins to intrigue with disaffected factions within the Norse Kingdom of York (also referred to as Jórvik). Mercian troops ravage the local countryside and peacefully overrun the fortress of Leicester (belonging to the Five Boroughs of the Danelaw), while her brother, King Edward the Elder, takes Stamford.
- June 12 – Æthelflæd dies at Tamworth while campaigning against the Vikings. She is buried with her husband Æthelred in St. Oswald's Priory at Gloucester. Æthelflæd is succeeded by her only daughter Ælfwynn.
- Kings Idwal Foel of Gwynedd and Hywel ap Cadell, and Prince Clydog of Deheubarth (Wales) submit to the overlordship of Edward the Elder. The Vikings raid Anglesey.

==== Asia ====
- July 25 – Wang Kon, a Korean general, overthrows the government of the short-lived state Ho Goguryeo and ascends the throne at Cheorwon. He founds the Goryeo dynasty and makes Song'ak his capital.
- Emperor Taizu of the Khitan Empire occupies a newly walled city called Shangjing (modern-day Inner Mongolia), meaning Supreme Capital. It becomes the residence of the Chinese Liao dynasty.

== Births ==
- Minamoto no Hiromasa, Japanese nobleman (d. 980)

== Deaths ==
- January 21 – Liu Zhijun, Chinese general
- June 12 – Æthelflæd, lady of Mercia (b. c.870)
- July 6 – William I, duke of Aquitaine (b. 875)
- September 10 – Baldwin II, Frankish margrave
- October 1 – Zhou, empress of Former Shu
- December 23 – Conrad I, Frankish king
- Gung Ye, king of Hu Goguryeo (Korea)
- Husayn ibn Hamdan, Abbasid general
- Lady Ren Neiming, Chinese noblewoman (b. 865)
- Miyoshi Kiyotsura, Japanese scholar (b. 847)
- Ottir (the Black), Norse Viking chieftain
- Tan Quanbo, Chinese warlord (approximate date)
- Wang Jian, emperor of Former Shu (b. 847)
- Xu Zhixun, Chinese governor and regent
- Zhu Jin, Chinese warlord (b. 867)
