= Liu Yan (emperor) =

Emperor of Southern Han from 917 to 942

Emperor Gaozu of Southern Han 南漢高祖
- Emperor of Great Yue (917–918); Emperor of Great Han (After 918)

1st Emperor of Southern Han
- Reign: 5 September 917 – 10 June 942
- Successor: Liu Bin

Jiedushi of Qinghai Circuit (清海軍節度使)
- Tenure: 911 – 917
- Predecessor: Liu Yin
- Successor: Proclaimed the emperor
- Born: 889
- Died: 10 June 942 (aged 53)
- Burial: Kang Mausoleum (康陵; in modern Panyu District, Guangzhou)
Full name
- Family name: Liú (劉); Given name: Originally Yán (巖), later Zhì (陟) (changed ~896), later Yán (巖) again (changed 911), later Gōng (龔) (changed 925), later Yǎn (龑) (changed 925)
Era dates
- Qiánhēng (乾亨) 917–925; Báilóng (白龍) 925–928; Dàyǒu (大有) 928–942
Regnal name
- 911–917: Prince of Nanhai (南海王); 917–918: Emperor of Great Yue (大越皇帝); After 918: Emperor of Great Han (大漢皇帝)
Posthumous name
- Tiānhuáng Dàdì (天皇大帝)
Temple name
- Gāozǔ (高祖)
- House: Liu
- Dynasty: Southern Han

Liu Yan (traditional Chinese: 劉龑; simplified Chinese: 刘䶮; pinyin: Liú Yǎn; Jyutping: Lau4 Jim2; 889 – 10 June 942), né Liu Yan (劉巖), also named Liu Zhi (劉陟) (from c. 896 to 911) and briefly as Liu Gong (劉龔), also known by his temple name as the Emperor Gaozu of Southern Han (南漢高祖), was the first emperor of the Chinese Southern Han dynasty, one of the Ten Kingdoms during the Five Dynasties and Ten Kingdoms period.

== Background ==
Liu Yan was born in 889, during the reign of Emperor Zhaozong of Tang. His father Liu Zhiqian (also known as Liu Qian) was then the prefect of Feng Prefecture (封州, in modern Fengkai, Guangdong) and was married to a Lady Wei, the niece of Wei Zhou (韋宙), a prior military governor (Jiedushi) of Lingnan East Circuit (嶺南東道, headquartered in modern Guangzhou, Guangdong), which Feng Prefecture belonged to. However, he also secretly had a concubine outside the home, a Lady Duan, and it was to Lady Duan that Liu Yan was born. When Lady Wei found out, she killed Lady Duan, but could not bear to kill the infant Liu Yan, and she took him back home to be raised as her own, as a younger brother to her own sons Liu Yin and Liu Tai (劉臺).

As Liu Yan grew up, it was said that he was tall and capable in both horsemanship and archery. After Liu Yan became the commander of the army of the circuit (which had been renamed Qinghai (清海) by that point under the military governor Li Zhirou the Prince of Xue in 896, Liu Yan was also given the title of military advisor to Li Zhirou as the Prince of Xue, and his name was changed from Liu Yan to Liu Zhi.

== Service under Liu Yin ==
In 901, Li Zhirou's successor Xu Yanruo died, leaving a recommendation to Emperor Zhaozong that Liu Yin be made acting military governor, and Liu Yin subsequently took that title. Liu Zhi continued serving under his brother, and was first recorded to have participated in a campaign in 902, when Lu Guangchou, who controlled the Qian Prefecture (虔州, in modern Ganzhou, Jiangxi) region as Qian's prefect, attacked Qinghai, capturing Shao Prefecture (韶州, in modern Shaoguan, Guangdong) and giving it to his son Lu Yanchang, and then putting Chao Prefecture (潮州, in modern Chaozhou, Guangdong) under siege. Liu Yin personally led an army and repelled Lu Guangchou from Chao, and then prepared to attack Shao. Under Liu Zhi's advice (as Liu Zhi believed that a direct attack would not be successful due to the strength of Lu Yanchang's army), he put Shao under siege to try to wear out Lu Yanchang's defense, but the strategy backfired when, due to high water levels on the river, the Qinghai army's food supplies were disrupted. Lu Guangchou then launched a relief army from Qian, repelling Liu Yin from Shao.

Meanwhile, Emperor Zhaozong commissioned the chancellor Cui Yuan as the new military governor of Qinghai, but Cui, while on the way to Qinghai, heard about popular uprisings in the region and also was worried that Liu Yin would not yield the position to him, and therefore returned to then-capital Luoyang. Subsequently, after Liu Yin bribed the powerful warlord Zhu Quanzhong the military governor of Xuanwu Circuit (宣武, headquartered in modern Kaifeng, Henan), who had the Tang imperial court under his physical control by that point, Emperor Zhaozong's son and successor Emperor Ai of Tang commissioned Liu Yin as full military governor in 904. Liu Zhi served as Liu Yin's deputy military governor. It was said that at that time, in addition to the continued conflict with Lu Guangchou, substantial portions of the region were controlled by other warlords—Khúc Hạo (曲顥) at Jiao Prefecture (交州, in modern Hanoi, Vietnam); Liu Shizheng (劉士政) at Gui Prefecture (桂州, in modern Guilin, Guangxi); Ye Guanglüe (葉廣略) at Yong Prefecture (邕州, in modern Nanning, Guangxi); Pang Juzhao (龐巨昭) at Rong Prefecture (容州, in modern Rong County, Guangxi); Liu Changlu (劉昌魯) at Gao Prefecture (高州, in modern Gaozhou, Guangdong); and Liu Qian (劉潛, different person than Liu Zhi's father) at Xin Prefecture (新洲, in modern Yunfu, Guangdong). In addition, east of the Pearl River, there were some 70 camps of people who did not recognize Liu Yin's authorities. It was said that after Liu Yin entrusted the military matters to Liu Zhi, Liu Zhi gradually had these warlords expelled or forced into submission, such that he became known as the preeminent general in the Lingnan region.

One of these campaigns was described as in or around 910 (by which time Liu Yin was a vassal of the new Later Liang, which Zhu had established as its Emperor Taizu, and carried the title of Prince of Nanping or Nanhai), when Liu Zhi attacked Liu Changlu at Gao Prefecture. Liu Changlu repelled his attack, but figured that he would not be able to indefinitely hold out against the Liu brothers, and therefore, along with Pang, offered to submit to Ma Yin the Prince of Chu. Ma sent troops to safely escort Liu Changlu and Pang back to his territory and had his general Yao Yanzhang take up garrison at Rong Prefecture.

In 911, Liu Yin grew deathly ill. He submitted a petition recommending Liu Zhi as acting military governor, and died shortly after. Liu Zhi took over the circuit. Shortly after, Later Liang's Emperor Taizu made Liu Zhi full military governor. His name was changed back to Liu Yan.

== As military governor ==
It was said that Liu Yan, while serving as military governor, frequently invited members of the intelligentsia who had fled from the Central Plain to serve on his staff, and often made them prefects of the circuit's prefectures, so among the prefects there were no military officers.

Meanwhile, also in 911, Lu Guangchou's son and successor Lu Yanchang was assassinated by his officer Li Qiu, who subsequently died and was succeeded by another officer, Li Yantu. As Li Qiu had considered killing Lu Guangchou's chief strategist Tan Quanbo, Tan claimed to be ill and retired from the Qian Prefecture army. Hearing of this, Liu Yan dispatched an army to attack Shao Prefecture and captured it; its prefect Liao Shuang (廖爽) fled to Chu, allowing Liu Yan to take Shao under his control. Meanwhile, he also again attacked Rong Prefecture. Yao Yanzhang was unable to stand up against his attacks despite being aided by a Chu relief force commanded by Xu Dexun, so Yao took the people and left Rong Prefecture, allowing Liu to take control of the Rong Prefecture region, as well as Gao Prefecture. Hearing of the war between two of his vassals, Later Liang's Emperor Taizu sent a delegation led by the official Wei Jian (韋戩) to try to mediate a peace between Ma and Liu. Liu responded by sending a large tribute of gold, silver, rhinoceros horns, ivory, and other assorted jewels and spices, to Emperor Taizu.

In late 912, Emperor Taizu was assassinated and succeeded by his son Zhu Yougui the Prince of Ying. In early 913, Zhu Yougui bestowed the honorary title of acting Taifu (太傅, "emperor's professor") on Liu. He was subsequently defeated in a countercoup led by his brother Zhu Youzhen the Prince of Jun and committed suicide. Zhu Youzhen, who took the throne and changed his name to Zhu Zhen, then gave Liu the title of not only military governor of Qinghai, but also of Jianwu Circuit (建武, headquartered at Yong Prefecture), and also created him the Prince of Nanping, a title previously held by Liu Yin.

Also in 913, Liu Yan sought a marital alliance with Ma Yin, and Ma agreed. In 915, Liu sent a delegation to Chu's capital Changsha to welcome Ma's daughter Empress Ma as his bride, and Ma sent his brother Ma Cun (馬存) to escort her to Qinghai. Meanwhile, Liu was dissatisfied that he was only given the title of Prince of Nanping, while another Later Liang vassal, Qian Liu, carried the greater title of Prince of Wuyue. He made a request to Zhu Zhen that he be created the similarly honored title of Prince of Nanyue and be given a further title as commander of the circuits. When Zhu Zhen refused, Liu commented:

Now the Central Plain is in confusion. No one knows who is the true Son of Heaven with the Mandate of Heaven. How can I send emissaries over the mountains and the seas to serve a false dynasty?

Thereafter, Liu stopped sending tributes and emissaries to the Later Liang court.

In fall 917, Liu went further and declared himself emperor of a new state of Yue, at his capital of Panyu (which he renamed Xingwang). He posthumously honored his grandfather Liu Anren (劉安仁), father Liu Qian, and brother Liu Yin as emperors. He commissioned the Later Liang emissaries Zhao Guangyi and Li Yinheng (who were previously detained by Liu Yin), as well as his deputy military governor Yang Dongqian, chancellors.

== As emperor of Yue ==
Also in 917, Liu Yan gave his niece, Liu Hua, the daughter of his brother Liu Yin, whom he had created the Princess Qingyuan, in marriage to Wang Yanjun, a son of his northeastern neighbor Wang Shenzhi the Prince of Min (who remained a Later Liang vassal), to cement a relationship between the two states.

In 918, after Liu Yan offered sacrifices to heaven and earth and issued a general pardon, he changed the name of his state from Yue to Han (and thus his state became known as Southern Han).

== As emperor of Southern Han ==
=== Early reign ===
In 919, Liu Yan pronounced his wife Lady Ma empress.

In 920, at Yang Dongqian's request, Liu Yan established schools and imperial examinations, apparently following the Tang model. He also sent emissaries to Former Shu, seeking friendly relations.

In 922, there was an incident where Liu Yan, believing in the words of a sorcerer that he needed to leave the capital to avoid a disaster, left Xingwang to visit Meikou (梅口, in modern Meizhou, Guangdong), near the Min border. The Min general Wang Yanmei (Wang Shenzhi's son or nephew) decided to launch a surprise attack on Liu Yan's train, but before Wang Yanmei's forces arrived, Liu Yan received the news and fled Meikou before Min forces could attack.

In 924, Liu Yan launched an attack on Min, advancing on the borders of Min's Ting (汀洲, in modern Longyan, Fujian) and Zhang (漳州, in modern Zhangzhou, Fujian) Prefectures. A Min counterattack defeated him, and he fled.

Meanwhile, in 923, Later Liang had been conquered by its northern rival Jin, whose prince Li Cunxu declared himself the emperor of a new Later Tang (as Emperor Zhuangzong). When the news reached Liu Yan, Liu Yan became fearful of this powerful new state in the north, and in 925 sent his official He Ci (何詞) to Later Tang to try to seek friendly relations in humble terms (referring to himself as "the King of the Great Han" rather than emperor while addressing Emperor Zhuangzong as "the Emperor of the Great Tang") and to find out more about the strength of this new dynasty. After He Ci returned, He Ci reported that Emperor Zhuangzong had become arrogant and excessive and that there was no need to be fearful of him; Liu Yan was pleased, and from this point on no longer sought communications with Later Tang.

Later in the year, it was said that a white dragon was discovered in the Han palace. In response, Liu Yan changed his era name to Bailong ("white dragon") and changed his own name to Gong (龔). However, later in the year, when foreign monks informed him that the character "Gong" was not favorable to Southern Han's fortune, he further changed his name to a newly created character (龑, Yǎn), showing the character of a dragon (龍) over that of heaven (天). The pronunciation was similar to his birth name, but distinct in tone. (The Zizhi Tongjian placed this second name change in 941.) Also in 925, when Zheng Min (鄭旻) the emperor of Changhe, sent his brother Zheng Zhaochun (鄭昭淳) to Southern Han to seek a marriage alliance, Liu Yan gave another niece, the Princess Zengcheng, to Zheng Min in marriage.

=== Middle reign ===
In 928, a Chu fleet attacked Southern Han and put Feng Prefecture under siege. In response, Liu Yan, believing that Dayou was a phrase from the I Ching that would portend good fortune in battle, changed the era name to Dayou, and also sent the general Su Zhang (蘇章) to take a fleet manned with well-trained archers to try to lift the siege on Feng. Su engaged the Chu fleet and pretended to withdraw after a skirmish, inducing the Chu fleet to chase; he then caught the Chu fleet in an ambush and defeated it, forcing the Chu forces to withdraw.

In 930, Liu Yan sent his generals Liang Kezhen (梁克貞) and Li Shoufu (李守鄜) to attack Jiao Prefecture; they captured it and took Khúc Thừa Mỹ (曲承美, son and successor of Khúc Hạo) captive, taking (for the time being) Jinghai Circuit (靜海, Vietnamese: Tĩnh Hải, headquartered at Jiao Prefecture) under Southern Han control and ending the control of the circuit by the Khúc family. Liang further advanced to Champa and pillaged it of its treasure. Liu stationed his general Li Jin (李進) at Jiao Prefecture to defend it.

The Southern Han hold on Jinghai would not last long, however. After the fall of the Khúcs, Dương Đình Nghệ – the prefect of Ai Prefecture (愛州, Vietnamese: Ái châu, in modern Thanh Hóa Province, Vietnam) built up a personal army of 3,000 adoptive sons, wanting to take control of Jinghai. Although Li knew about this, he did nothing as he was receiving regular bribes from Dương. In 931, Dương Đình Nghệ put Jiao Prefecture under siege. Liu Yan sent the general Cheng Bao (程寶) to try to lift the siege, but before Cheng could get there, the city fell. Li fled back to Xingwang, where Liu put him to death. Cheng tried to recapture Jiao Prefecture, but Dương Đình Nghệ defeated and killed him in battle.

In 932, Liu Yan created his 19 sons as imperial princes.

In 934, Empress Ma died.

Also in 934, Liu Yan allowed his then-surviving oldest son Liu Hongdu the Prince of Qin (Liu Hongdu's older brothers Liu Yaoshu and Liu Guitu having died earlier) to form a guard force of his own, but these guard ranks were filled with hoodlums that Liu Hongdu was close to. When Yang Dongqian tried to speak on this matter to advise Liu Yan to curb Liu Hongdu's activities, as Liu Hongdu was commonly regarded as the heir, Liu Yan refused to listen. When Yang subsequently observed the guards pillage gold and silk from merchants and the merchants' fear causing them not to report the matter, Yang lamented, "If the rule is as troubled as this, what is a chancellor for?" He thus claimed an illness and retired to his mansion. Liu Yan subsequently never again summoned Yang for any audiences, and Yang eventually died at his home without returning to chancellorship.

=== Late reign ===
In 936, Liu Yan sent his general Sun Dewei (孫德威) to attack Chu's Meng (蒙州, in modern Wuzhou, Guangxi) and Gui (桂州, in modern Guilin, Guangxi). When Chu's prince Ma Xifan (Ma Yin's son) personally went to Gui Prefecture to defend against the attack, Sun withdrew.

In 937, Dương Đình Nghệ was killed by his general Kiều Công Tiễn (矯公羨), who took over Jinghai. In 938, when another former general of Dương's, Ngô Quyền (吳權), rose at Ai Prefecture and subsequently attacked Jiao Prefecture, Kiều Công Tiễn sought aid from Southern Han. Liu Yan wanted to use this opportunity to take over Jinghai again, so he commissioned his son Liu Hongcao as the military governor of Jinghai and changed his title to Prince of Jiao, having him command an army to head to Jiao Prefecture while Liu Yan himself commanded a follow-up army. By the time that Liu Hongcao was approaching Jiao Prefecture, however, Ngô Quyền had already defeated and killed Kiều Công Tiễn and occupied Jiao Prefecture. When Liu Hongcao prepared to attack, Ngô Quyền set a trap for him—setting large wooden planks covered with iron into the tidal zone, such that when Liu Hongcao attacked at high tide, the planks were invisible, but when the tide fell, the Southern Han ships became stuck on the planks and unable to move. Ngô Quyền then counterattacked, killing more than half of the Southern Han soldiers, including Liu Hongcao. Liu Yan, hearing the news, cried bitterly and withdrew his own fleet. (This became known as the Battle of Bạch Đằng River.)

In 939, Zhao Guangyi, pointing out that there had not been any emissaries sent between Southern Han and Chu after Empress Ma's death and that the two states, related by marriage, should be friendly to each other, recommended the official Li Shu (李紓) as an appropriate emissary. Liu Yan agreed, and after Li visited Chu, Chu also sent emissaries to Southern Han, reestablishing relations between the two states. Despite this, in 941, Liu Yan sent an emissary to Later Jin's Emperor Gaozu (whose Later Jin state had earlier taken over Later Tang's territory) seeking a military alliance where they would attack Chu and divide its territory; the Later Jin emperor declined.

In 942, Liu Yan grew seriously ill. He considered both of his oldest surviving sons, Liu Hongdu and Liu Hongxi the Prince of Jin, to be arrogant and unrestrained, and considered a younger son, Liu Hongchang the Prince of Yue, to be an appropriate successor. He thus considered sending Liu Hongdu and Liu Hongxi out of the capital and making Liu Hongchang his heir. However, the official Xiao Yi (蕭益) persuaded him that bypassing older sons would cause disturbances, and so Liu Yan did not carry out this plan. He soon died, and Liu Hongdu became emperor (as Emperor Shang).

The Zizhi Tongjian, summarizing the opinions from other sources, commented about Liu Yan's reign:

Gaozu [(i.e., Liu Yan)] was observant and capable of political tactics, but was self-important, often referring to the emperors of the Central Plain as "prefect of Luo Prefecture" [(i.e., Luoyang, which often served as the capital of Five Dynasties states)]. The Lingnan region was where rare jewels could be gathered, so he was luxurious in his living and favored beautiful things, adorning his palaces with gold, jades, and pearls. He was cruel in his punishments, using methods including cutting off noses, cutting off tongues, dismemberment, cutting pregnant women open, tying people to heated iron poles, and boiling people. He also sometimes put poisonous snakes in the water and threw criminals into the water, referring to this as "water prison." When the chancellor Yang Dongqian tried to correct his ways, he would not listen to Yang. In his late years, he was particularly suspicious of the intelligentsia, believing that the officials would be more concerned about the welfare of their descendants rather than of the state, and therefore became trusting of eunuchs. Therefore, from this point on, Southern Han had many eunuchs.

== Personal information ==
- Father
  - Liu Zhiqian or Liu Qian, posthumously honored Emperor Shengwu with the temple name of Daizu.
- Mother
  - Lady Duan, Liu Zhiqian's concubine.
- Wife
  - Empress Ma, daughter of Ma Yin, the prince of Chu:
- Major concubine
  - Consort Zhao, mother of Prince Hongdu, later consort dowager.
- Children
  - Liu Yaoshu (劉耀樞), the Prince of Yong (created 932), died early
  - Liu Guitu (劉龜圖), the Prince of Kang (created 932), died early
  - Liu Hongdu (劉弘度), later renamed Liu Bin, initially the Prince of Bin (created 932), later the Prince of Qin (created 932), later emperor
  - Liu Hongxi (劉弘熙), later renamed Liu Sheng, the Prince of Jin (created 932), later emperor
  - Liu Hongchang (劉弘昌), the Prince of Yue (created 932, killed by Liu Sheng 944)
  - Liu Hongbi (劉弘弼), the Prince of Qi (created 932, killed by Liu Sheng 947)
  - Liu Hongya (劉弘雅), the Prince of Shao (created 932, killed by Liu Sheng 945)
  - Liu Hongze (劉弘澤), the Prince of Zhen (created 932, killed by Liu Sheng 944)
  - Liu Hongcao (劉弘操), initially the Prince of Wan (created 932), later the Prince of Jiao (created and killed in battle 938).
  - Liu Honggao (劉弘杲), the Prince of Xun (born 923, created 932, killed by Liu Sheng 943).
  - Liu Hongwei (劉弘暐), the Prince of En (created 932, killed by Liu Sheng 947)
  - Liu Hongmiao (劉弘邈), the Prince of Gao (created 932, killed by Liu Sheng 954)
  - Liu Hongjiǎn (劉弘簡) (note different tone than his brother), the Prince of Tong (created 932, killed by Liu Sheng 947)
  - Liu Hongjiàn (劉弘建) (note different tone than his brother), the Prince of Yi (created 932, killed by Liu Sheng 947)
  - Liu Hongji (劉弘濟), the Prince of Bian (created 932, killed by Liu Sheng 947)
  - Liu Hongdao (劉弘道), the Prince of Gui (created 932, killed by Liu Sheng 947)
  - Liu Hongzhao (劉弘照), the Prince of Yi (created 932, killed by Liu Sheng 947)
  - Liu Hongzheng (劉弘政), the Prince of Tong (created 932, killed by Liu Sheng 955)
  - Liu Hongyi (劉弘益), the Prince of Ding (created 932, killed by Liu Sheng 947)

== See also ==
- Ngô Quyền
- Battle of Bạch Đằng (938)

Regnal titles
Preceded by Liu Yin	Prince of Nanhai/Nanping; 913–917	Succeeded by None
Preceded by Zhu Zhen of Later Liang	Emperor of China (Guangdong/Guangxi); 917–942	Succeeded by Liu Bin (Emperor Shang)
Preceded by None (dynasty founded)	Emperor of Southern Han; 917–942	Succeeded by Liu Bin (Emperor Shang)
