= Ye Guanglüe =

Tang dynasty warlord

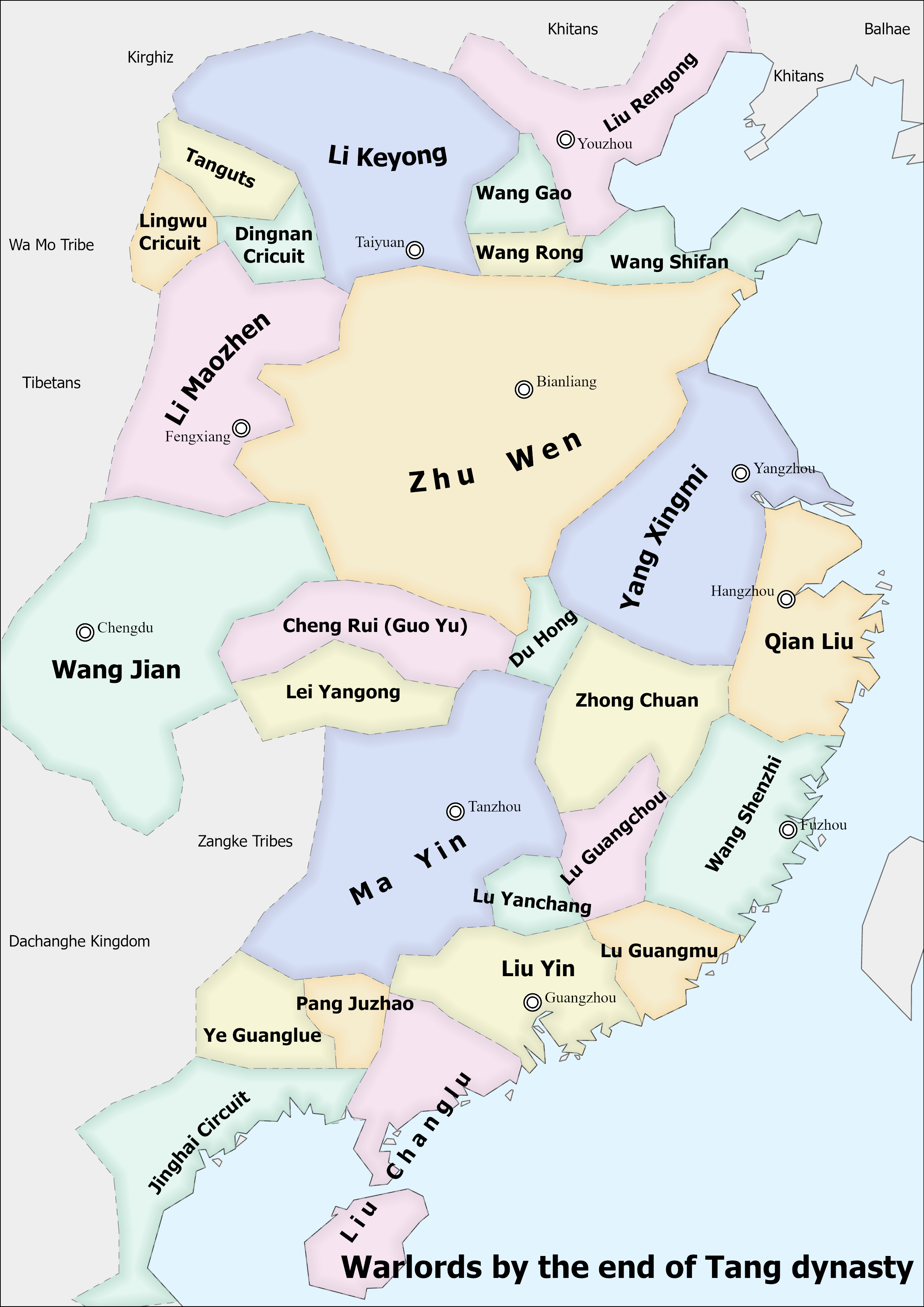
Map of warlords before the end of the Tang dynasty, with the location of Ye Guanglüe's territory

Ye Guanglüe (Chinese: 叶广略, ? – 911?), also romanized as Ye Guanglue or Ye Guanglve, was a warlord in the last years of the Tang dynasty. He was the governor of Yongzhou in the late 9th century and managed to keep his territory safe during the deadly rebellion led by Huang Chao. He was promoted to be the jiedushi of Guangxi in 906 and became a self-governing warlord.

The Tang dynasty was overthrown by Zhu Wen, who established the Later Liang dynasty in 907. Ye Guanglüe kept his semi-independent status, though he nominally surrendered to Later Tang. In 911, Liu Yan, a stronger warlord based in Guangzhou, tried to annex Ye's territory. Ye joined force with Pang Juzhao (another warlord based in Rongzhou) and Khuc Thua My (the jiedushi of Jinghai Circuit) to confront Liu Yan but was eventually defeated. Ye Guanglüe surrendered to Liu Yan and was later executed. In 917, Liu Yan established the Southern Han kingdom and Ye's territory became a part of it as the Jianwu Circuit.
