= Stephen (son of Kalomaria) =

The magistros Stephen (Greek: Στέφανος; fl. 886–921) was a relative of Empress Theodora and a high-ranking courtier in the Byzantine court of the late 9th and early 10th centuries.

== Life ==
In the sources, he is commonly called "Stephen the magistros, the son of Kalomaria" (Στέφανος ὁ μάγιστρος ὁ τῆς Καλομαρίας). This makes him a son of Maria, the sister of Empress Theodora, the wife of Emperor Theophilos (reigned 829–842) and regent for Michael III (r. 842–867). He is first mentioned in 886, at the beginning of the reign of Leo VI the Wise (r. 886–912), when he was tasked, along with the Domestic of the Schools Andrew the Scythian, with leading the court examining Patriarch Photios and Theodore Santabarenos on accusations of treason. Like Andrew, Stephen had been a member of the court under Leo's father Basil I the Macedonian (r. 867–886), but by the end of Basil's reign apparently belonged to a group of followers of Leo, who in 883 were even accused of plotting against Basil. His career prior to 886 is unknown, but on his seal, dated to ca. 913–922, are recorded the ranks which he successively held: basilikos protospatharios, patrikios and anthypatos.

Stephen is not mentioned again for most of Leo's reign, but he probably retained his title of magistros throughout this time. He is next attested ca. 908 in an act of adjudication concerning the Kolobou Monastery near Mount Athos, as a member of the committee examining the case. In 910, he was the recipient of a letter by the diplomat Leo Choirosphaktes, in which the latter pleaded with Stephen to intercede with the emperor and secure his recall from exile.

In June 913, he was appointed by Leo's brother and successor Alexander (r. 912–913) as one of the seven guardians of the underage Constantine VII (r. 913–959), along with the Patriarch Nicholas I Mystikos, the fellow magistros John Eladas, the rhaiktor John Lazanes, the otherwise obscure Euthymius and Alexander's henchmen Basilitzes and Gabrielopoulos. In this capacity, he participated in the reception of the sons of the Bulgarian Tsar Simeon in the Palace of Blachernae in August 913, along with Patriarch Nicholas Mystikos and John Eladas.

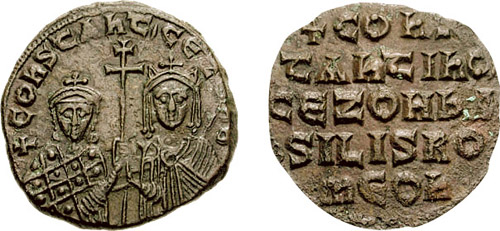
Follis with Empress-regent Zoe and her son, Constantine VII

He remained in high standing under the regency of Empress-dowager Zoe Karbonopsina (914–919), for in 917 he was able, along with Constantine Gongyles, to intercede and save the admiral Romanos Lekapenos from being blinded for failing to adequately support the land army during the disastrous Battle of Acheloos against the Bulgarians. His high position becomes evident from the fact that in 919, when Zoe was deposed from the regency by Constantine VII with the support of Lekapenos, the young emperor sought recognition of the fact from Stephen and Patriarch Nicholas Mystikos. Stephen was unable, however, to prevent Lekapenos from staging a coup on 25 March 919: as the imperial fleet, led by Lekapenos, sailed into the Boukoleon harbour, Stephen fled the palace. Romanos Lekapenos was immediately named magistros and megas hetaireiarches, and effectively took over the reins of government.

Lekapenos moved swiftly to consolidate his position: in April 919 his daughter Helena was married to Constantine VII, and Lekapenos assumed the new title basileopator; on 24 September, he was named Caesar; and on 17 December 919, Romanos Lekapenos was crowned senior emperor. A number of plots against the usurper were discovered over the next few years, and loyalists of the powerless Constantine VII were purged and exiled. Despite his advanced age—he must have been over 80 at the time—on 8 February 921, Stephen too fell victim to such a purge. Accused of having himself designs on the throne, he was exiled to the island of Antigone, where he was forced to become a monk. His supporters Theophanes Teichiotes and the orphanotrophos Paul were also exiled.

== Sources ==
- Lilie, Ralph-Johannes; Ludwig, Claudia; Pratsch, Thomas; Zielke, Beate (2013). Prosopographie der mittelbyzantinischen Zeit Online. Berlin-Brandenburgische Akademie der Wissenschaften. Nach Vorarbeiten F. Winkelmanns erstellt (in German). Berlin and Boston: De Gruyter.
- Runciman, Steven (1988) [1929]. The Emperor Romanus Lecapenus and His Reign: A Study of Tenth-Century Byzantium. Cambridge, United Kingdom: Cambridge University Press. ISBN 0-521-35722-5.
- Tougher, Shaun (1997). The Reign of Leo VI (886–912): Politics and People. BRILL. ISBN 978-90-04-10811-0.
