= 847 =

Calendar year

847 in various calendars
- Gregorian calendar: 847; DCCCXLVII
- Ab urbe condita: 1600
- Armenian calendar: 296; ԹՎ ՄՂԶ
- Assyrian calendar: 5597
- Balinese saka calendar: 768–769
- Bengali calendar: 253–254
- Berber calendar: 1797
- Buddhist calendar: 1391
- Burmese calendar: 209
- Byzantine calendar: 6355–6356
- Chinese calendar: 丙寅年 (Fire Tiger); 3544 or 3337 — to — 丁卯年 (Fire Rabbit); 3545 or 3338
- Coptic calendar: 563–564
- Discordian calendar: 2013
- Ethiopian calendar: 839–840
- Hebrew calendar: 4607–4608
- Hindu calendars
- Vikram Samvat: 903–904
- Shaka Samvat: 768–769
- Kali Yuga: 3947–3948
- Holocene calendar: 10847
- Iranian calendar: 225–226
- Islamic calendar: 232–233
- Japanese calendar: Jōwa 14 (承和１４年)
- Javanese calendar: 744–745
- Julian calendar: 847; DCCCXLVII
- Korean calendar: 3180
- Minguo calendar: 1065 before ROC 民前1065年
- Nanakshahi calendar: −621
- Seleucid era: 1158/1159 AG
- Thai solar calendar: 1389–1390
- Tibetan calendar: མེ་ཕོ་སྟག་ལོ་ (male Fire-Tiger); 973 or 592 or −180 — to — མེ་མོ་ཡོས་ལོ་ (female Fire-Hare); 974 or 593 or −179

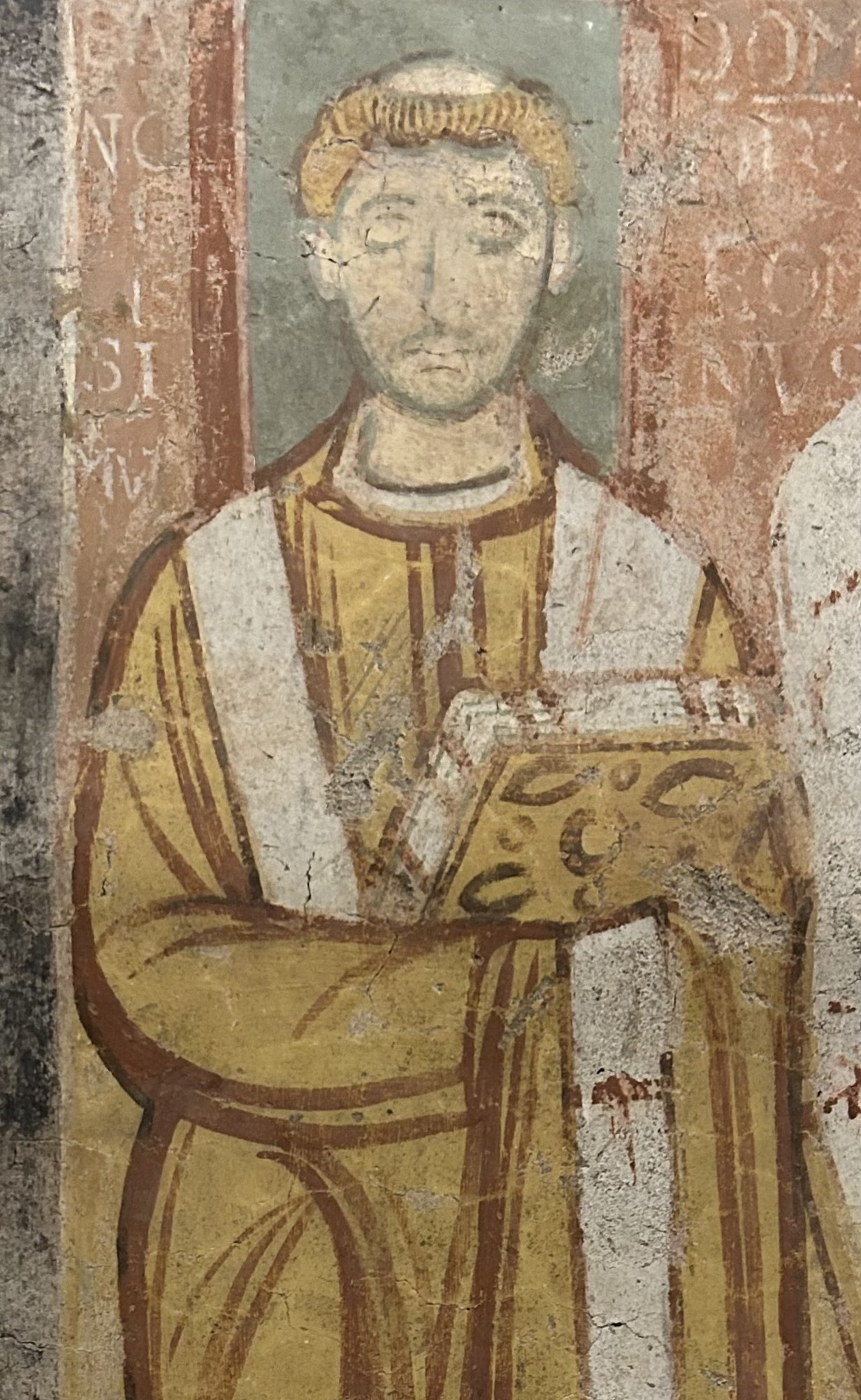
April 10 – Pope Leo IV consecrated

Year 847 (DCCCXLVII) was a common year starting on Saturday of the Julian calendar.

== Events ==
=== By place ===
==== Europe ====
- Danish Vikings land in the Breton March (western part of Gaul). Duke Nominoe of Brittany fails to withstand them in battle, but succeeds in buying them off with gifts and persuading them to leave (approximate date).
- Viking Age: The Vikings plunder the Lower Rhine, as part of their attacks on the Empire of Francia.
- The Saracens, under the Berber leader Kalfun, capture the Byzantine city of Bari (Southern Italy). He becomes the first ruler of the Emirate of Bari, and expands his influence on the Italian mainland with raids.

==== Abbasid Caliphate ====
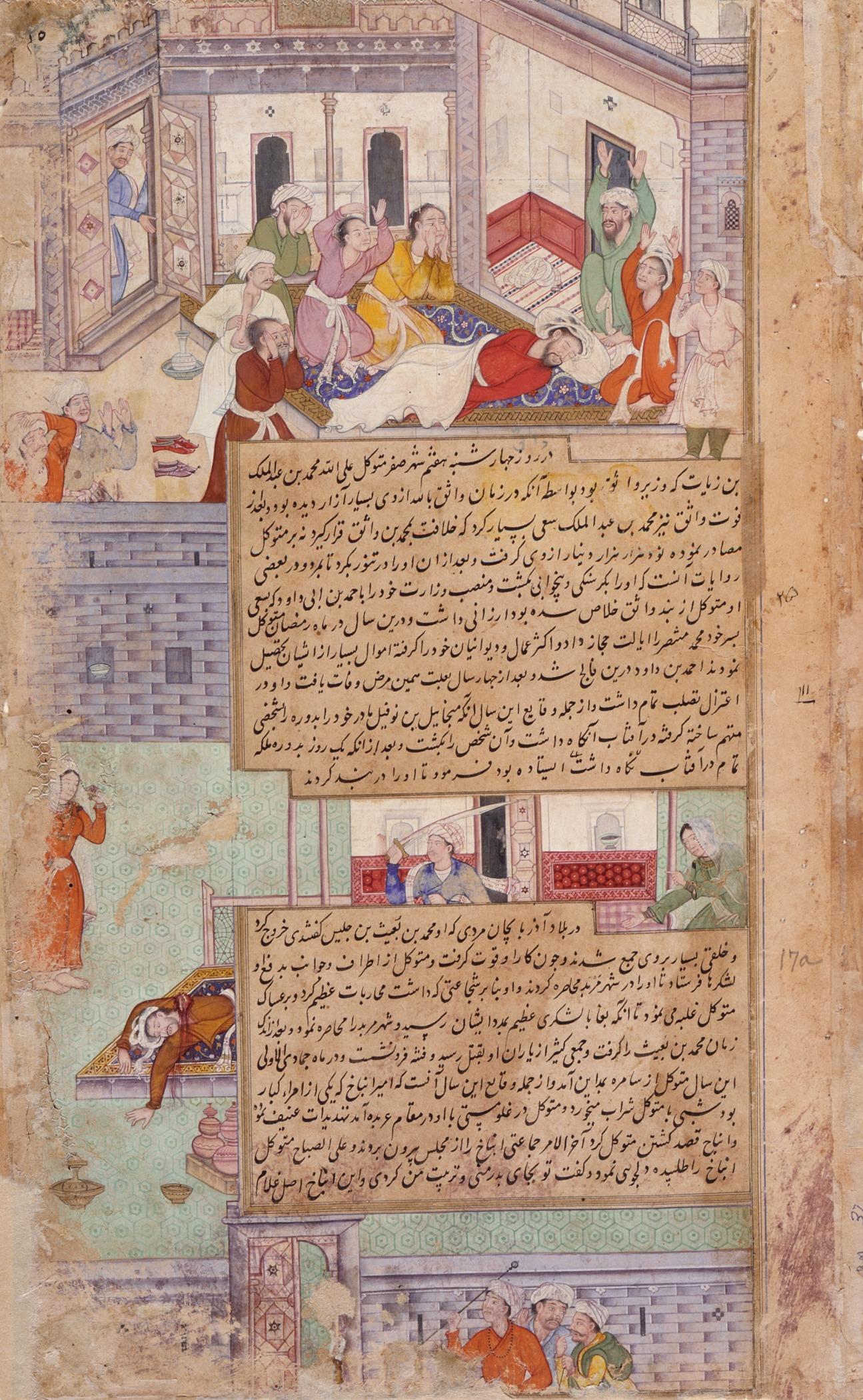
August 10 – Caliph Al-Wathiq dies

- August 10 – Abbasid Caliph Al-Wathiq dies of dropsy after a five-year reign. He is succeeded by his brother al-Mutawakkil.

=== By topic ===
==== Natural events ====
- November 24 – 847 Damascus earthquake.

==== Religion ====
- January 24 – Pope Sergius II dies of gout after a 3-year reign.
- April 10 – Leo IV is consecrated 103rd pope of Rome (where he was born c.790). Because of the sense of urgency driven by the previous year's Arab raid against Rome, he is consecrated without waiting for the consent of the Holy Roman Emperor. He will reign until 855.
- April 21 – Rabanus Maurus, a Frankish Benedictine monk, becomes archbishop of Mainz after the death of Odgar.

== Births ==
- Æthelred I, king of Wessex (approximate date)
- Al-Mu'tazz, Muslim caliph (d. 869)
- Charles the Child, king of Aquitaine (or 848)
- Cheng Ji, Chinese general (approximate date)
- Fujiwara no Sukeyo, Japanese aristocrat (d. 897)
- Kang Junli, general of Tang dynasty Chine (d. 894)
- Lu Yi, Chancellor of the Tang dynasty China (d. 905)
- Miyoshi Kiyotsura, Japanese scholar (d. 918)
- Wang Jian, Chinese emperor of Former Shu (d. 918)
- Wang Jingchong, general of Tang dynasty China (d. 883)

== Deaths ==
- January 27 – Sergius II, pope of the Catholic Church (b. 790)
- April 21 – Odgar, Frankish monk and archbishop
- June 1 – Xiao, empress dowager of Tang dynasty China
- June 14 – Methodius I, patriarch of Constantinople
- August 10 – Al-Wathiq, Muslim caliph (b. 816)
- Fedelmid mac Crimthainn, king of Munster (Ireland)
- Frothar of Toul, Frankish bishop (approximate date)
- Hetto, Frankish archbishop (approximate date)
- Isa ibn Mansur al-Rafi'i, Muslim governor
- Muhammad ibn al-Zayyat, Abbasid vizier
- Li Rangyi, chancellor of Tang dynasty China
- Theodemar of Iria, Galician bishop
