= Yao Yanzhang =

Yao Yanzhang (Chinese: 姚彥章; died May 25, 939), courtesy name Jihui (繼徽), was a key general serving under Ma Yin (King Wumu) of the Ma Chu dynasty.

== During Tang ==
It is not known when Yao Yanzhang was born, but it is known that he was from Ru'nan (汝南, in modern Zhumadian, Henan). The progress of his initial military career was not clear — but, presumably, like Ma Yin, he was initially conscripted into the army of the late Tang dynasty warlord Qin Zongquan, who controlled his home region, and then, after Qin declared himself emperor of a new state, was sent south on an expedition commanded by Qin's general Sun Ru; after Sun was defeated and killed by Yang Xingmi, Yao, presumably as was in the case with Ma, followed Liu Jianfeng, who headed southwest, eventually taking over Wu'an Circuit (武安, headquartered in modern Changsha, Hunan), where Liu became its military governor.

In 896, Liu was assassinated by his soldier Chen Zhan (陳瞻) after carrying out an affair with Chen's wife. The officers killed Chen and initially offered leadership to Liu's strategist Zhang Ji (張佶). However, at the time that Zhang was about to accept leadership and enter the headquarters, his horse bit his leg. Believing this to be a bad omen, he instead recommended Ma to take over leadership. As Ma was then, under orders Liu previously ordered, attacking Shao Prefecture (邵州, in modern Shaoyang, Hunan), which was then occupied by the officers Jiang Xun (蔣勛) and Deng Jichong (鄧繼崇) (who had previously rebelled against Liu's rule), Zhang sent emissaries to formally summon Ma back from the Shao campaign. Ma initially hesitated. Yao, who was then serving under Ma in the Shao campaign, persuaded him to accept, stating, "You, Lord, were effectively three people in the same flesh with General Liu and Commander Zhang. Now the General suffered disaster, and the Commander hurt his leg. The will of heaven and the wishes of the people are all on you; who can it be other than you, Lord?" Ma therefore left the officer Li Qiong (李瓊) to continue to the Shao siege while he himself returned to Wu'an's capital Tan Prefecture (in modern Changsha, Hunan) to accept command of the circuit. (Zhang, after transferring command to Ma, himself assumed command of the Shao campaign, and captured the prefecture and Jiang in 897.)

In 898, it was under Yao's recommendation that Ma launched a campaign to try to capture Heng (衡州, in modern Hengyang, Hunan), Yong (永州, in modern Yongzhou, Hunan), Dao (道州, in modern Yongzhou), Lian (連州, in modern Qingyuan, Guangdong), and Chen (郴州, in modern Chenzhou, Hunan) Prefectures. Yao also recommended Li Qiong as the commander of the operations, and Ma agreed. Ma's army was able to thereafter capture all five prefectures and take them under Ma's control. After the end of the campaign, Ma commissioned Yao as the prefect of Li Prefecture (澧州, in modern Changde, Hunan). Later, Ma made him the commander of the Jingjiang Circuit (靜江, headquartered in modern Guilin, Guangxi) army.

== During Chu ==
As of 910 — by which time Tang had fallen, and Ma Yin was effective the ruler of his own state (Chu, as its prince) that formally was a vassal to Tang's successor state Later Liang — Yao Yanzhang was referred to as the prefect of Heng Prefecture (橫州, in modern Nanning, Guangxi), in addition to being the commander of the Jingjiang army. That year (or slightly before), the warlord who controlled the Lingnan region, Liu Yin the military governor of Qinghai Circuit (清海, headquartered in modern Guangzhou, Guangdong), had sent his brother Liu Yan to try to capture Rong (容州, in modern Yulin, Guangxi) and Gao (高州, in modern Maoming, Guangxi) Prefectures, respectively, but Liu Yan was repelled by Pang Juzhao (龐巨昭) the military governor of Ningyuan Circuit (寧遠, headquartered at Rong Prefecture) and Liu Changlu (劉昌魯) the defender of Gao. However, Liu Changlu believed that he eventually could not withstand another attack from Liu Yin, and therefore, in 910, wrote Ma and offered the prefecture to him. Ma sent Yao to welcome him and escort him to Chu territory. When Yao passed through Rong Prefecture, Pang's officer Mo Yanzhao (莫彥昭) tried to persuade Pang to ambush him, but Pang refused; instead, Pang killed Mo and also surrendered his circuit to Ma. Ma made Yao the acting prefect of Rong, and Yao had soldiers escort Pang, Liu Changlu, and their families to Chu's capital Changsha.

In 911, at Ma's request, the Later Liang emperor Zhu Huang commissioned Yao to be the deputy military governor of Ningyuan. However, that year, Liu Yan against attacked Rong. Ma sent the general Xu Dexun to try to aid Yao. But Yao, believing that the defenses could not hold, took the people of Rong and its treasury and returned to Changsha, allowing Liu Yin to take over Rong and Gao.

In 913, Yao commanded a Chu navy in attacking E Prefecture (鄂州, in modern Wuhan, Hubei), then belonging to Chu's northeastern neighbor Wu. Wu sent the general Lü Shizao (呂師造) to aid the E garrison. Before Lü could reach E, however, Yao withdrew.

In 921, Chu came under the attack of the non-Han tribe known as the "barbarians of Chen and Xu" (辰漵蠻, i.e., from modern Huaihua, Hunan). Yao led an army against them and defeated them.

In 927 — by which time Later Liang had fallen, and Ma was the vassal of the succeeding Later Tang — the Later Tang emperor Li Siyuan gave Ma the greater title of King of Chu. With that greater title, Ma established a governmental structure that mirrored the structure of the imperial government. He made Yao and Xu his chancellors. Yao died in 939.

== Notes and references ==
- Spring and Autumn Annals of the Ten Kingdoms, vol. 72.
- Zizhi Tongjian, vols. 260, 261, 262, 267, 268, 271, 276.
