= Liu Zhiqian =

Liu Qian (劉謙) or Liu Zhiqian (劉知謙) (d. 894), posthumously honored by Southern Han as Emperor Shengwu (聖武皇帝, "holy and martial") with the temple name of Daizu (代祖), was an army officer of the Chinese Tang dynasty's Qinghai Circuit (清海, headquartered in modern Guangzhou, Guangdong). Liu Qian, due to his accomplishments, came to hold Lingnan East's Feng Prefecture (封州, in modern Zhaoqing, Guangdong) as its prefect, and build up his army strength there, eventually, after his death, allowing his son Liu Yin to take over all of Qinghai Circuit and then for Liu Yin's younger brother Liu Yan to establish a new state of Southern Han.

== Background ==
The traditional sources conflict about Liu Qian's family origins, but what they agreed on was that he came from what was then considered meager social station. According to the New Book of Tang, he was from Shangcai, but came to reside at Feng Prefecture due to disturbances in his home region. According to the History of the Five Dynasties, his father — referred to as Liu Ren'an (劉仁安) — came to reside in the Lingnan region after serving as the secretary general of Chao Prefecture (潮州, in modern Chaozhou, Guangdong). According to the New History of the Five Dynasties, his father — referred to as Liu Anren (劉安仁) — was originally from Shangcai and took refuge in the Min (閩, i.e., modern Fujian) region, later becoming a merchant who settled down in the Lingnan region. Regardless of how he came to be in the region, he eventually became a low-level army officer in the Qinghai Circuit army. Despite his low social station, the military governor (jiedushi) of the region (which was then known as Lingnan East Circuit (嶺南東道), although it would later be renamed Qinghai), Wei Zhou (韋宙), was impressed by Liu's talents, and decided to give his niece to Liu in marriage. When Wei's wife objected, Wei stated, "This man is no ordinary man. Perhaps one day my descendants could depend on him." Subsequently, Liu distinguished himself in campaigns against agrarian rebels.

In 879, the major agrarian rebel Huang Chao overrun Lingnan East's capital Guang Prefecture (廣州). After Huang abandoned it in 880, the region was left in confusion. Liu Qian took this opportunity to take control of Feng Prefecture. In 883, then-reigning Emperor Xizong commissioned Liu as the prefect of Feng and the defender of Heshui Base (賀水鎮, in modern Nanning, Guangxi).

== Governance of Feng Prefecture ==
As the prefect of Feng, it was said that Liu Qian welcomed refugees, governed appropriately, and built up his army strength. It was not long after that he built his army to the size of over 10,000 men and possessed a good number of warships, and his prefecture was pacified. When he subsequently grew ill, he summoned his sons, and stated to them:

These days, the bandits are everywhere in the Wuling region. I have strong armors and weapons. You should use them to accomplish great things and not let this opportunity pass by!

After Liu Qian died in 894, his soldiers supported his son Liu Yin as their leader. Then-military governor of the circuit (which had been renamed Qinghai by this point) Liu Chonggui (劉崇龜) thereafter recommended Liu Yin to Emperor Xizong's brother and successor Emperor Zhaozong, and Emperor Zhaozong commissioned Liu Yin as the prefect of Feng to replace Liu Qian.

== Personal information ==
- Father
  - Liu Anren (劉安仁) or Liu Ren'an (劉仁安), posthumously honored Emperor Wen with the temple name of Taizu
- Wife
  - Lady Wei, mother of Liu Yin and Liu Tai, niece of Wei Zhou (韋宙), posthumously honored Empress Wu
- Concubine
  - Lady Duan, mother of Liu Yan
- Children
  - Liu Yin (劉隱), later military governor of Qinghai Circuit
  - Liu Tai (劉台)
  - Liu Yan (劉巖), name later changed to Liu Yan (劉龑), emperor of Southern Han

== Notes and references ==
- New Book of Tang, vol. 190.
- Zizhi Tongjian, vols. 255, 259.
