= Li Yantu =

Li Yantu (李彥圖) (died 913) was a ruler of Qian Prefecture (虔州, in modern Ganzhou, Jiangxi) from 912 to 913, early in the Chinese Five Dynasties and Ten Kingdoms period.

Nearly nothing is known about Li Yantu's personal background, including where or when he was born. In 912, when Li Qiu, who had seized control of Qian Prefecture after assassinating the prior ruler Lu Yanchang and subsequently was given the title of defender of Qian by Zhu Wen, died, Li Yantu took over by himself and apparently took the title of defender of Qian as well. (It is not clear from the extant historical records whether he received official sanction from Later Liang and/or its rival Wu, to whom Lu had previously submitted.) After Li Yantu's seizure of power, the senior officer Tan Quanbo, a long-time strategist for Lu Yanchang's father Lu Guangchou, whom Li Qiu had considered killing, claimed to be seriously ill and retired from military service. Upon hearing of Tan's illness, Liu Yan the military governor of Qinghai Circuit (清海, headquartered in modern Guangzhou, Guangdong), nominally a Later Liang vassal, attacked Shao Prefecture (韶州, in modern Shaoguan, Guangdong), which had been part of the domain of the Qian Prefecture rulers since Lu Guangchou's time. Liao Shuang (廖爽) the prefect of Shao, whom Lu Yanchang had commissioned, abandoned Shao and fled to Chu, ending Qian rulers' control of Shao.

In 913, Li Yantu died. The people of the prefecture supported Tan to succeed him.
