= Li Qiu =

Li Qiu (黎球) (died 911/912) was an army officer who ruled Qian Prefecture (虔州, in modern Ganzhou, Jiangxi) briefly after assassinating the previously ruler Lu Yanchang in 911, early in the Chinese Five Dynasties and Ten Kingdoms period. He died shortly after taking over Lu's position.

== Brief rule of Qian Prefecture ==
Little is known about Li Qiu's background. What is known is that, as of 911, he carried the title of the commander of the Baisheng Army (百勝軍) under Lu Yanchang the prefect of Qian Prefecture. (Lu's father Lu Guangchou had carried the title of defender of Baisheng Circuit, so presumably this was a title that Li had carried over from serving under Lu Guangchou.) That year, with Lu Yanchang's having alienated his army by spending his time on games and hunts, Li assassinated him and took over Qian Prefecture. He also considered killing Lu Guangchou's chief strategist Tan Quanbo, but Tan escaped by claiming that he was retiring due to old age. Zhu Wen thereafter made Li the defender of Qian Prefecture. Li died soon thereafter and was succeeded by his officer Li Yantu.
