= Óengus mac Óengusa =

Irish poet (died 930)

Óengus mac Óengusa (aka Aenghus mac Aenghusa), Irish poet, died 930.

Óengus mac Óengusa held the post of Chief Ollam of Ireland.

His obit is given in the Annals of the Four Masters as follows- “M930.9 Aenghus, son of Anghus, chief poet of Ireland, died.”

His obit is given in the Annals of Inisfallen as follows- “AI932.1 Kl. Death of Aengus son of Angus, [chief poet] of Ireland.”

Preceded by Torpaid mac Taicthech	Chief Ollam of Ireland; 913–930	Succeeded by Bard Boinne
