= 859 =

Calendar year

859 in various calendars
- Gregorian calendar: 859; DCCCLIX
- Ab urbe condita: 1612
- Armenian calendar: 308; ԹՎ ՅԸ
- Assyrian calendar: 5609
- Balinese saka calendar: 780–781
- Bengali calendar: 265–266
- Berber calendar: 1809
- Buddhist calendar: 1403
- Burmese calendar: 221
- Byzantine calendar: 6367–6368
- Chinese calendar: 戊寅年 (Earth Tiger); 3556 or 3349 — to — 己卯年 (Earth Rabbit); 3557 or 3350
- Coptic calendar: 575–576
- Discordian calendar: 2025
- Ethiopian calendar: 851–852
- Hebrew calendar: 4619–4620
- Hindu calendars
- Vikram Samvat: 915–916
- Shaka Samvat: 780–781
- Kali Yuga: 3959–3960
- Holocene calendar: 10859
- Iranian calendar: 237–238
- Islamic calendar: 244–245
- Japanese calendar: Ten'an 3 / Jōgan 1 (貞観元年)
- Javanese calendar: 756–757
- Julian calendar: 859; DCCCLIX
- Korean calendar: 3192
- Minguo calendar: 1053 before ROC 民前1053年
- Nanakshahi calendar: −609
- Seleucid era: 1170/1171 AG
- Thai solar calendar: 1401–1402
- Tibetan calendar: ས་ཕོ་སྟག་ལོ་ (male Earth-Tiger); 985 or 604 or −168 — to — ས་མོ་ཡོས་ལོ་ (female Earth-Hare); 986 or 605 or −167

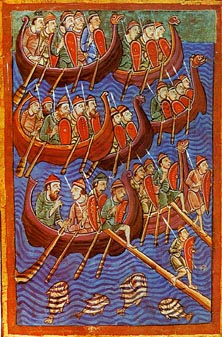
Vikings begin an expedition in the Mediterranean (between 859 and 862)

Year 859 (DCCCLIX) was a common year starting on Sunday of the Julian calendar.

== Events ==
=== By place ===
==== Europe ====
- January 15 – Battle of St. Quentin: Frankish forces, led by Humfrid, defeat King Louis the German at Saint-Quentin (Northern France). Humfrid is enfeoffed with the County of Autun, and appointed Margrave of Burgundy, by King Charles the Bald.
- Summer – The Viking chieftains Hastein and Björn Ironside (a son of Ragnar Lodbrok) begin an expedition, and sail from the Loire River with a fleet of 62 ships, to raid cities and monasteries in the Mediterranean Sea.
- Viking raiders invade the Kingdom of Pamplona (Western Pyrenees), and capture King García Íñiguez I, somewhere in the Andalusian heartland. They extort a ransom, rising to around 70,000 gold dinars.
- The Russian city of Novgorod is first mentioned in the Sofia Chronicles.
- Winter – The weather is so severe that the Adriatic Sea freezes, and Italy is covered in snow for 100 days.

==== Iberian Peninsula ====
- Battle of Albelda: King Ordoño I of Asturias, and his ally García Íñiguez I, defeat the Muslims under Musa ibn Musa al-Qasawi at Albelda.
- Viking raiders burn the mosques of Seville and Algeciras in al-Andalus (modern Spain).

==== Africa ====
- The University of Al Karaouine is founded in Fes (modern Morocco), by Fatima al-Fihri (recognized by the Guinness Book of World Records as the oldest still-operating university in the world).

==== China ====
- September 7 – Emperor Xuān Zong (Li Yi) dies after a 13-year reign. He is succeeded by his eldest son Yi Zong, as ruler of the Tang dynasty.

==== Syria ====
- 859 Syrian coast earthquake. It affected the Mediterranean coast of Syria It caused almost the complete destruction of Latakia and Jableh, major damage at Antioch and led to many deaths.

== Births ==
- Al-Hadi ila'l-Haqq Yahya, first Zaydi Imam of Yemen (d. 911)
- Ali ibn Isa al-Jarrah, vizier of the Abbasid Caliphate (d. 946)
- Odo I, king of the West Frankish Kingdom (or 860)
- Rudolph I, king of Burgundy (d. 912)
- Tannet of Pagan, king of Burma (d. 904)

== Deaths ==
- September 7 – Xuān Zong, emperor of the Tang dynasty (b. 810)
- December 13 – Angilbert II, archbishop of Milan
- Dhul-Nun al-Misri, Egyptian scholar and Sufi (b. 796)
- Immo, bishop of Noyon (approximate date)
- Lu Shang, chancellor of the Tang dynasty (b. 789)
- Máel Gualae, king of Munster (Ireland)

== Sources ==
- Martínez Díez, Gonzalo (2007). Sancho III el Mayor Rey de Pamplona, Rex Ibericus (in Spanish). Madrid: Marcial Pons Historia. ISBN 978-84-96467-47-7.
