= Tan Quanbo =

Tan Quanbo (譚全播) (857 - died 918? or 950) was a ruler of Qian Prefecture (虔州, in modern Ganzhou, Jiangxi) from 913 to 918, early in the Chinese Five Dynasties and Ten Kingdoms period. He was a long-time strategist of Lu Guangchou, who ruled Qian Prefecture for 25 years, and after several transitional rulers after Lu's death was supported by the people to govern the prefecture. In 918, he was defeated by Wu forces, which took over Qian. He died shortly after.

== Background ==
Tan Quanbo was born in 857 in Nankang (南康, in modern Ganzhou, Jiangxi). It was said that Tan was brave and intelligent in his youth, but he was more impressed with Lu Guangchou, who was also from Nankang. In the late Tang dynasty, when the southern parts of the Tang realm were overrun by agrarian rebels, Tan encouraged Lu to start a rebellion as well, and Lu did so. When the group of rebels that they gathered wanted to support Tan as their leader instead, Tan yielded the leadership position to Lu, and further threatened to execute those who would not follow Lu's orders, bringing the rebels in line.

In 885, Lu captured Qian Prefecture. He took the title of prefect and made Tan his chief strategist.

== Under governance of Lu Guangchou ==
In 902, Lu Guangchou made an attack south to enlarge his territory. He first captured Shao Prefecture (韶州, in modern Shaoguan, Guangdong), and he had his son Lu Yanchang take control of it. He then put Chao Prefecture (潮州, in modern Chaozhou, Guangdong) under siege, but was then repelled by Liu Yin the acting military governor of Qinghai Circuit (清海, headquartered in modern Guangzhou, Guangdong). Liu Yin then, despite his brother Liu Yan's opposition, attacked Shao Prefecture. Tan Quanbo laid an ambush for the Qinghai troops and defeated them, allowing Lu Guangchou to retain Shao. Despite the victory, Tan did not take credit and instead praised the other officers involved, causing Lu to trust him further.

In 910 (by which time Tang had fallen and the realm had been divided into a number of rival states, including Later Liang and Wu, both of which Lu nominally submitted to), Lu fell ill, and he wanted to yield his position to Tan. Tan declined. When Lu subsequently died, and Lu Yanchang arrived from Shao to mourn his father, Tan supported Lu Yanchang to succeed Lu Guangchou. Subsequently, both Wu's prince Yang Longyan and Later Liang's Emperor Taizu confirmed the succession. Tan continued to serve under Lu Yanchang.

== Under governance of Lu Yanchang, Li Qiu, and Li Yantu ==
By 911, Lu Yanchang had alienated his army by spending his time on hunts and games. He was assassinated by his officer Li Qiu, who took over Qian Prefecture and who also considered killing Tan Quanbo. Tan avoided being killed by claiming that he was old and ill and requesting retirement. Soon thereafter, Li Qiu died, and was succeeded by his officer Li Yantu. Also fearful of Li Yantu, Tan claimed that his sickness had gotten worse. Meanwhile, hearing that Tan was ill, Liu Yin's brother and successor Liu Yan, also nominally a Later Liang vassal, attacked Shao Prefecture. Shao's prefect Liao Shuang (廖爽) fled to Chu, ending the Qian rulers' hold on Shao.

== As ruler of Qian ==
Li Yantu died in 912. The people of Qian supported Tan to succeed him. Tan thereafter submitted to Later Liang, and Later Liang's Emperor Taizu made him the defender of Baisheng Circuit (a title that Lu Guangchou also carried) and the military governor (Jiedushi) of Qian and Shao (even though the control of Shao had been lost by that point). It was said that over the next few years, Tan governed with benevolence.

In 918, Wu launched a major attack on Qian Prefecture, commanded by the officer Wang Qi (王祺), with troops from four prefectures — Hong (洪州, in modern Nanchang, Jiangxi), Fu (撫州, in modern Fuzhou, Jiangxi), Yuan (袁州, in modern Yichun, Jiangxi), and Ji (吉州, in modern Ji'an, Jiangxi). This attack came as a surprise to the people of Qian, as Wu's strategist Yan Keqiu had spent large amount of funds to employ engineers to open up the waterway through Ganshi (贛石, in modern Ji'an), which was difficult to navigate, to allow the Wu ships through. However, Qian had good natural defenses, and the Wu forces were not able to capture it quickly. The Wu forces then suffered through plagues, which killed many soldiers, including Wang, who was then replaced by Liu Xin (劉信).

Meanwhile, Tan sought aid from three states which were Later Liang vassals — Wuyue, Min, and Chu. In response, Wuyue's prince Qian Liu sent his son Qian Chuanqiu (錢傳球) to attack Wu's Xin Prefecture (信州, in modern Shangrao, Jiangxi); Chu's prince Ma Yin sent his officer Zhang Keqiu (張可求) to advance to Guting (古亭, in modern Ganzhou); and Min's prince Wang Shenzhi sent an army to advance to Yudu (雩都, in modern Ganzhou), all seeking to aid Tan. The Wuyue forces, however, were repelled by Xin's prefect Zhou Ben. Subsequently, Liu sent part of his army to repel the Chu army. When the Wuyue and Min forces heard that the Chu army had been repelled, they withdrew, leaving Tan without external aid.

Still, Liu could not capture Qian Prefecture, and in fall 918, he withdrew after extracting a tribute from Tan. When he sent a messenger to report this to the Wu regent Xu Wen, Xu was incensed and whipped Liu's messenger. He then gave Liu's son Liu Yingyan (劉英彥) 3,000 men and stated to Liu Yingyan:

Your father was upstream from here. He had 10 times as many people as the enemy but could not even capture a city. Obviously, he intends to commit treason. You can take this army and commit treason with your father!

When Liu Yingyan arrived at Liu Xin's army and relayed what Xu stated, Liu Xin, in fear, returned to Qian and attacked it again. The city fell. Tan fled to Yudu, but was captured there by Wu forces. They took Tan back to the Wu capital Jiangdu (江都, in modern Yangzhou, Jiangsu). Yang Longyan thereafter bestowed the title of military governor of Baisheng on Tan. He died shortly after at Jiangdu, at the age of 84.

== Notes and references ==
- New History of the Five Dynasties, vol. 41.
- Spring and Autumn Annals of the Ten Kingdoms, vol. 8.
- Zizhi Tongjian, vols. 256, 263, 267, 268, 270.
