= Qianzhou (modern Jiangxi) =

Prefecture in imperial China, 589 to 1153

Qianzhou or Qian Prefecture (虔州) was a zhou (prefecture) in imperial China centering on modern Ganzhou, Jiangxi, China. It existed (intermittently) from 589 to 1153.

== Geography ==
The administrative region of Qianzhou in the Tang dynasty falls within modern Ganzhou in southern Jiangxi. It probably includes modern:

- Ganzhou
- Gan County
