= Torpaid mac Taicthech =

Torpaid mac Taicthech (died 913) was an Irish poet.

Torpaid held the post of Chief Ollam of Ireland.

The Genealogies from Rawlinson B 502 state he belonged to the Uí Daigre - “¶1638] Torpaid m. Taicthich m. Échtgusa m. Cáechthuile m. Aimre m. Doaltair m. Fínáin m. Áedloga m. Doborgin m. Finnchon m. Maellrach m. Fáeláin m. Dorbo m. Fáelgine m. Conath m. Luigdech m. Daigri.”

His obit is given in the Annals of Inisfallen as follows- “AI913.2 Repose of Torpaid son of Taicthech, chief poet of Ireland.”

Preceded by Flann mac Lonáin	Chief Ollam of Ireland; 896–913	Succeeded by Óengus mac Óengusa
