= John Eladas =

John Eladas (Greek: Ἰωάννης ὁ Ἐλαδᾶς; died 914) was a senior member of the Byzantine court and regent in the early 10th century.

== Life ==
He is first mentioned during the reign of Leo VI the Wise (r. 886–912), when he held the title of patrikios and was tasked with collecting money (possibly in exchange for commuting military service) from the European themata. Under Leo VI's brother and successor, Alexander (r. 912–913) he bore the supreme non-imperial title, that of magistros, which he may have received already under Leo.

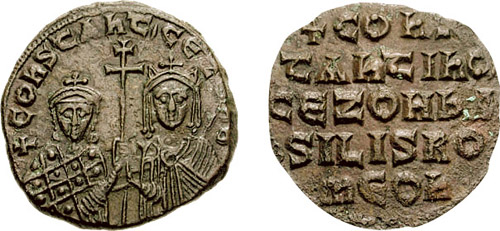
Follis with Empress-regent Zoe and her son, Constantine VII

In June 913, shortly before his death, Alexander appointed him as guardian and member of a regency council for Leo's underage son, Constantine VII (r. 913–959), along with the Patriarch Nicholas I Mystikos, the fellow magistros Stephen, the rhaiktor John Lazanes, the otherwise obscure Euthymius and Alexander's henchmen Basilitzes and Gabrielopoulos. In this capacity, Eladas was instrumental in defeating the attempted coup of general Constantine Doukas, by mobilising the palace guard and arming the rowers of the imperial fleet. Eladas' forces confronted the rebel's supporters at the Chalke Gate, and in the ensuing clash, Constantine Doukas was killed.

In August 913, along with his fellow members of the regency, Patriarch Nicholas Mystikos and the magistros Stephen, he received the sons of the Bulgarian tsar Simeon in the Palace of Blachernae. Both Eladas and Stephen soon began to oppose the dominance of the patriarch in the regency council, leading in March 914 to his departure and the assumption of the regency by Leo's widow Zoe Karbonopsina. Upon Eladas' advice, she removed Alexander's henchmen from the regency council. However, Eladas himself fell ill soon after, and withdrew from the Great Palace of Constantinople to that of Blachernae, where he died.

== Sources ==
- Lilie, Ralph-Johannes; Ludwig, Claudia; Pratsch, Thomas; Zielke, Beate (2013). Prosopographie der mittelbyzantinischen Zeit Online. Berlin-Brandenburgische Akademie der Wissenschaften. Nach Vorarbeiten F. Winkelmanns erstellt (in German). Berlin and Boston: De Gruyter.
- Runciman, Steven (1988) [1929]. The Emperor Romanus Lecapenus and His Reign: A Study of Tenth-Century Byzantium. Cambridge, United Kingdom: Cambridge University Press. ISBN 0-521-35722-5.
