= Pope Lando =

Head of the Catholic Church from 913 to 914

- Bishop of Rome
- Church: Catholic Church
- Papacy began: August or September 913
- Papacy ended: February or March 914
- Predecessor: Anastasius III
- Successor: John X
- Previous post: Cardinal-Deacon of the Holy Roman Church (910–913)

Personal details
- Born: Sabina, Papal States
- Died: March 914 Rome, Papal States

Lando (also known as Landus) (Note: In the second declension. Although sometimes less common in Medieval Latin, names ending in -o in Latin tend to be written in third declension (e.g. Landonis, Platonis in genitive case).) was the pope from 913 until his death in 914. His short pontificate fell during an obscure period in papal and Roman history, the so-called Saeculum obscurum (904–964).

According to the Liber pontificalis, Lando was born in the Sabina (Papal States), and his father was a wealthy Lombard count named Taino (Note: Ferdinand Gregorovius, History of the City of Rome in the Middle Ages (Cambridge University Press, 1897), Vol. 3, p. 238, gives his father's name as Raino.) from Fornovo. The start of his pontificate has been placed as early as July or as late as November 913. The Liber claims that his pontificate lasted only four months and twenty-two days. A different list of popes, appended to a continuation of the Liber pontificalis at the Abbey of Farfa and quoted by Gregory of Catino in his Chronicon Farfense in the twelfth century, gives Lando a pontificate of six months and twenty-six days. This is closer to the duration recorded by Flodoard of Reims, writing in the tenth century, of six months and ten days. The end of his pontificate can be dated to between 5 February 914, when he is mentioned in a document of Ravenna, and late March or early April, when his successor, John X, was elected.

Lando is thought to have been the candidate of Count Theophylact I of Tusculum and Senatrix Theodora, who were the most powerful couple in Rome at the time. The Theophylacti controlled papal finances through their monopoly of the office of vestararius, and also controlled the Roman militia and Senate. During Lando's reign, Arab raiders, operating from their stronghold on the Garigliano river, destroyed the cathedral of San Salvatore in Vescovio in his native diocese. No document of Lando's chancery has survived. The only act of his reign that is recorded is a donation to the diocese of Sabina mentioned in a judicial act of 1431. Lando made the large personal gift in order to restore the cathedral of San Salvatore so that the clergy who were then living at Toffia could return.

Lando was the last pope to have a papal name never used before until Pope John Paul I in 1978, and the last with a unique name requiring no regnal number until Pope Francis in 2013.

== Notes ==
Catholic Church titles
Preceded by Anastasius III	Pope; 913–914	Succeeded by John X
