= Lu Guangchou =

Lu Guangchou (盧光稠) (died 910) was a warlord late in the Chinese Tang dynasty and who nominally submitted to both the succeeding Later Liang and Later Liang's rival Wu after the end of Tang, who controlled the Qian Prefecture (虔州, in modern Ganzhou, Jiangxi) region from 885 to his death in 910.

== Background and seizure of Qian Prefecture ==
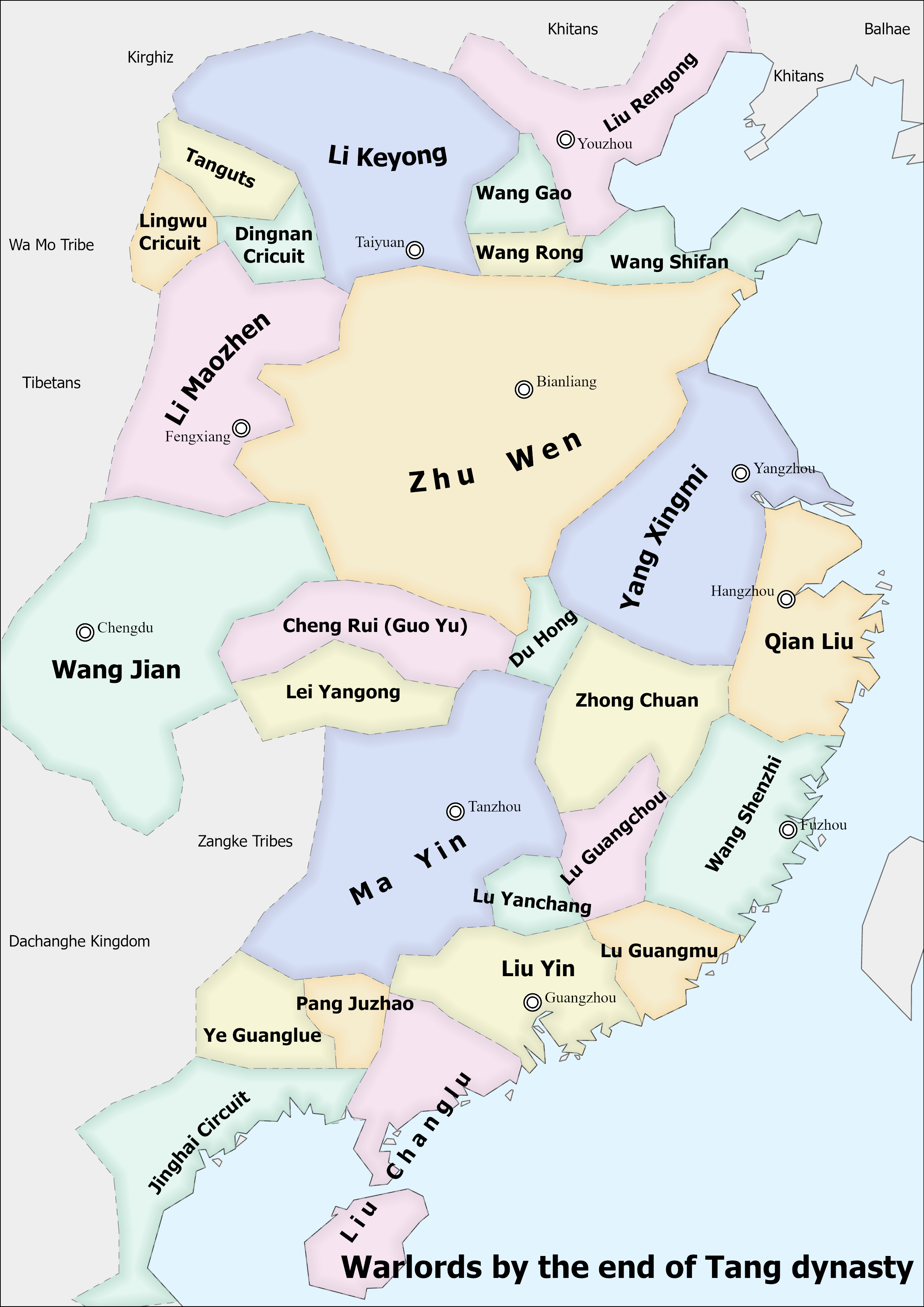
Map of warlords before the end of the Tang dynasty, with the territory controlled by Lu Guangchou, and his brother Lu Guangmu

It is not known when Lu Guangchou was born, but it is known that he was from Nankang (南康, in modern Ganzhou, Jiangxi). It was said that Lu had an impressive physique, but was not particularly talented; nevertheless, he impressed fellow Nankang native Tan Quanbo. In the late Tang dynasty, when the southern parts of the Tang realm were overrun by agrarian rebels, Tan encouraged Lu to start a rebellion as well, and Lu did so. When the group of rebels that they gathered wanted to support Tan as their leader instead, Tan yielded the leadership position to Lu, and further threatened to execute those who would not follow Lu's orders, bringing the rebels in line.

In 885, Lu captured Qian Prefecture. He took the title of prefect and made Tan his chief strategist.

== Governance of Qian Prefecture ==
In 902, Lu Guangchou made an attack south to enlarge his territory. He first captured Shao Prefecture (韶州, in modern Shaoguan, Guangdong), and he had his son Lu Yanchang take control of it. He then put Chao Prefecture (潮州, in modern Chaozhou, Guangdong) under siege, but was then repelled by Liu Yin the acting military governor of Qinghai Circuit (清海, headquartered in modern Guangzhou, Guangdong). Liu Yin then, despite his brother Liu Yan's opposition, attacked Shao Prefecture. Tan Quanbo laid an ambush for the Qinghai troops and defeated them, allowing Lu Guangchou to retain Shao. Despite the victory, Tan did not take credit and instead praised the other officers involved, causing Lu to trust him further.

After the Tang throne was seized by the major warlord Zhu Quanzhong the military governor of Xuanwu Circuit (宣武, headquartered in modern Kaifeng, Henan) in 907, ending Tang and starting a new Later Liang with Zhu as its Emperor Taizu, the territory north of Lu's was controlled by the state of Hongnong (later also known as Wu), which did not submit to Later Liang and instead continued to maintain Tang era name, while the territory to the south was controlled by Liu Yin, then still a Later Liang vassal. Lu submitted tributes to the Later Liang emperor. In response, Emperor Taizu made Qian and Shao into a Baisheng Circuit (百勝) and made Lu its defender (防禦使, Fangyushi).

In 909, after Hongnong defeated and captured the independent warlord Wei Quanfeng, who had controlled four prefectures centered around Fu Prefecture (撫州, in modern Fuzhou, Jiangxi), Hongnong took control of Wei's territory. In response, Lu sent a petition submitting to Hongnong's prince Yang Longyan, although he also continued to submit to Later Liang. In 910, Emperor Taizu gave him the title of acting military governor of Zhennan Circuit (鎮南, headquartered in modern Nanchang, Jiangxi), which was then Hongnong territory.

Later that year, Lu fell ill, and he wanted to yield his position to Tan. Tan declined. When Lu subsequently died, and Lu Yanchang arrived from Shao to mourn his father, Tan supported Lu Yanchang to succeed Lu Guangchou. Subsequently, both Yang Longyan and Later Liang's Emperor Taizu confirmed the succession.

== Notes and references ==
- New Book of Tang, vol. 190.
- New History of the Five Dynasties, vol. 41.
- Zizhi Tongjian, vols. 256, 263, 267.
