= Lu Yanchang =

Lu Yanchang (盧延昌) (died 911) was a ruler of the Qian Prefecture (虔州, in modern Ganzhou, Jiangxi) region early in the Chinese Five Dynasties and Ten Kingdoms period. He inherited his position from his father Lu Guangchou, who had ruled the region for 25 years, but himself ruled only from 910 to 911 before being assassinated and succeeded by his officer Li Qiu.

== Background ==
It is not known when or where Lu Yanchang was born, but it is known that his father Lu Guangchou was from Nankang (南康, in modern Ganzhou, Jiangxi). By 895, Lu Guangchou, who was then an agrarian rebel leader, had taken over Qian Prefecture and taken the title of prefect. In 902, after Lu Guangchou conquered Shao Prefecture (韶州, in modern Shaoguan, Guangdong), he had Lu Yangchang govern it as prefect. When Lu Guangchou was subsequently repelled in his attack on Chao Prefecture (潮州, in modern Chaozhou, Guangdong) by Liu Yin the acting military governor of Qinghai Circuit (清海, headquartered in modern Guangzhou, Guangdong), Liu attacked Shao Prefecture, but was defeated in an ambush by Lu Guangchou's officer Tan Quanbo, allowing Lu Guangchou to retain Shao.

== As ruler of Qian Prefecture ==
Lu Yanchang remained the prefect of Shao Prefecture until 910, when Lu Guangchou died. Before Lu Guangchou's death, he had initially wanted to pass his position to Tan Quanbo, but Tan declined. When Lu Yanchang subsequently arrived to mourn his father's death, Tan supported him to succeed Lu Guangchou and continued to serve under him. Lu Yanchang thereafter remained at Qian Prefecture, and his positions were confirmed by the rulers of two states that were rivals to each other but to both of whom Lu Guangchou had nominally submitted — Later Liang's Emperor Taizu, and Wu's Yang Longyan. Yang Longyan bestowed the title of prefect of Qian on Lu Yanchang, which he accepted, but he submitted a petition through Ma Yin the Prince of Chu — a vassal of Later Liang — stating:

I accepted the commission from Huainan [(淮南, i.e., Wu, as Wu's main territory was previously Tang dynasty's Huainan Circuit)] just to stop them from plotting against me. I will surely take the Jiangxi territories for the empire.

Emperor Taizu thereafter bestowed on Lu the title of acting military governor of Zhennan Circuit (鎮南, headquartered in modern Nanchang, Jiangxi, which was then Wu territory). Lu had his officer Liao Shuang (廖爽) succeed him as the prefect of Shao.

After Lu took over as prefect of Qian, however, he was said to devote his time to games and hunts. In 911, his officer Li Qiu killed him and seized his position.
