= Cheng Ji (Wuyue) =

Cheng Ji (成及)

Personal details
- Born: c. 847; Qiantang, Hang Prefecture, Tang
- Died: 913 (aged 65–66); Wuyue
- Children: Cheng Rensu (成仁璛)
- Parent: Cheng Zhen (成貞) (father)

Cheng Ji
- Chinese: 成及
Transcriptions
Standard Mandarin
- Hanyu Pinyin: Chéng Jí

Xian Ji
- Chinese: 咸及
Transcriptions
Standard Mandarin
- Hanyu Pinyin: Xián Jí

Cheng Hongji
- Traditional Chinese: 成弘濟
- Simplified Chinese: 成弘济
Transcriptions
Standard Mandarin
- Hanyu Pinyin: Chéng Hóngjì

Xian Hongji
- Traditional Chinese: 咸弘濟
- Simplified Chinese: 咸弘济
Transcriptions
Standard Mandarin
- Hanyu Pinyin: Xián Hóngjì

Xian Ji (c. 847–913, courtesy name Hongji), known as Cheng Ji before 908, was a general during the late Tang dynasty and early Wuyue kingdom, serving as a chief strategist for Qian Liu, Wuyue's first king. Cheng Ji was very close to Qian Liu, and his son Cheng Rensu married Qian Liu's daughter.

Cheng Ji was captured by warlord Yang Xingmi in 896 but refused to submit. He was eventually returned to Qian Liu.
