= Southern Tang campaign against Chu =

Date	951–952
Location	Modern Hunan, northeast Guangxi
Result	Royal Ma family of Chu deposed.; Southern Tang defeated.; Majority of Chu territory secured by Liu Yan, who pledged vassalage to the Later Zhou.; Southern Han conquered Lingnan.

Belligerents
Southern Tang	Chu Hengshan Langzhou rebels	Southern Han

Commanders and leaders
Li Jing; Bian Hao; Guo Zaicheng (郭再誠); Zhang Luan (張鸞)	Ma Xichong (surrendered); Tuoba Heng (拓跋恆) (surrendered); Gui Wei (癸未) (surrendered) Ma Xi'e (surrendered); Peng Shigao (彭師暠) (surrendered); Liao Yan (廖偃) (surrendered) Liu Yan (劉言); Wang Kui (王逵)	Liu Sheng; Wu Huai'en (吳懷恩); Pan Chongche (潘崇彻); Xie Guan (謝貫)

Strength
Unknown	Unknown	Unknown

Casualties and losses
Unknown	Unknown	Unknown

The Southern Tang campaign against Chu was a military conflict during the Five Dynasties and Ten Kingdoms period. Infighting between several members of the royal Ma family weakened the kingdom of Chu after the death of Ma Xifan. In 950 Ma Xi'e defeated Ma Xiguang with assistance from the Southern Tang and pledged allegiance to Li Jing. In early 951, after becoming an unpopular ruler, Ma Xi'e was deposed and exiled to Hengshan, where locals rallied to his cause. Competing for control of Chu was Ma Xichong, installed at the Chu capital of Tanzhou after the deposition of Ma Xi'e. Ma Xichong feared the rebel armies coalescing in Langzhou led by Liu Yan, the forces of Ma Xi'e at Hengshan, and his own unrestive generals. He pleaded for assistance from Li Jing, who ordered for a Southern Tang army under Bian Hao to march onto Tanzhou. Arriving there in December 951, Bian Hao deposed Ma Xichong and deported him to the Southern Tang capital of Jinling. Similar orders were sent to Hengshan, which were agreed to by Ma Xi'e, who feared an attack by the Southern Tang.

The Chu Kingdom had become extinguished with relative ease by the Southern Tang but their rule wouldn't last. The new administration of Hunan was exploitive as material wealth was shipped to Jinling to enrich the imperial treasuries which caused considerable turmoil. Control over the Chu domain didn't remain uncontested. In winter 951 Liu Sheng of the Southern Han ordered the capture of the Lingnan region. A Southern Tang counterattack in summer 952 failed to evict them from the area. The final Chu holdout that remained was Langzhou, under the command of Liu Yan. While initially pledging loyalty to Li Jing, he launched a surprise strike against Tanzhou. After a brief siege Bian Hao surrendered the city and the Southern Tang administration crumbled as other officials fled Hunan. Liu Yan secured control over most of the former Chu realm and proclaimed loyalty to Guo Wei of the Later Zhou in order to protect against a revanchist Southern Tang. The Southern Tang effectively gained nothing from the financially draining military adventure.

== Background ==
The kingdom of Chu existed in present-day Hunan and northeastern Guangxi. Its founder Ma Yin pledged fealty to the Central Plains based regimes that existed after the collapse of the Tang dynasty. His successors were instructed to pass the throne onto their younger brothers rather than their own children. This succession arrangement broke down when Ma Xifan died in 947. Ma Xi'e was then the oldest living son of Ma Yin. He held the postings of Wuping Circuit (武平) jiedushi, headquartered in Lang Prefecture, and prefect of Yong Prefecture (永州). However, Chu court officials declared the younger Ma Xiguang to be the new ruler. This decision was contested by Ma Xi'e, who petitioned Liu Chengyou of the Later Han to submit tribute separately from Ma Xiguang, but the request was denied.

In 949 Ma Xi'e launched a revolt to claim the Chu throne. Ma Xichong had secretly corresponded with him and pledged assistance prior to his rebellion. In an engagement with Chu forces commanded by the prefect of Yue Prefecture, Wang Yun (王贇), Ma Xi'e was defeated and forced to retreat to Langzhou. To gain outside help he pledged vassalage to the Southern Tang. Li Jing dispatched an army under general He Jingzhu (何敬洙) to aid him in his rebellion. Meanwhile, military support from the Later Han was requested by Ma Xiguang. However, their defensive commitments against the Khitan prevented them from intervening.

Late in 950 a rebel advance against the Chu capital of Tanzhou began. With hostile armies approaching, Ma Xiguang put the general Xu Keqiong in command of the defending Chu forces. However, after a short siege in January 951, Xu surrendered Tanzhou. Ma Xi'e was welcomed by a group of officials led by Ma Xichong that requested he take the Chu throne. Finally in control of Chu, Ma Xi'e sent tribute to the Southern Tang court in spring 951, which confirmed his position as prince of Chu. Chancellor Sun Sheng and diplomat Yao Feng (姚鳳) represented Li Jing in the conferral ceremony in Tanzhou.

Ma Xi'e quickly became unpopular due to his excessive lifestyle. Resistance developed in the military to the new prince of Chu. The reconstruction of Tanzhou was done by poorly paid soldiers at his command. Frustrated at their conditions, they revolted and eventually seized Langzhou. Mutinous officers appointed Ma Guanghui as the Wuping Circuit jiedushi but he was soon deposed in favor of Liu Yan (劉言). Another group of dissatisfied military officers overthrew Ma Xi'e on 22 October 951. This coup d'etat occurred with Ma Xichong's foreknowledge and he was installed as the new prince of Chu. The deposed Ma Xi'e was sent to Hengshan, where local officers declared him the Prince of Hengshan and gathered over 10,000 troops to resist Tanzhou.

== Annexation ==
The continued turmoil in Chu didn't go unnoticed by the Southern Tang. They had previously assisted Ma Xi'e in defeating Ma Xiguang. Once in control of Tanzhou, Ma Xi'e sent Liu Guangfu (劉光輔) in spring 951 as an envoy to pay homage to Li Jing. While in Jinling he treacherously discussed the apparent ease in overthrowing the ruling Ma family. In anticipation of a potential chance to strike Chu, Bian Hao was appointed prefect of Xin Prefecture, but was stationed at Yuanzhou with a 10,000 strong force. When rebels seized Langzhou in 951 the Southern Tang offered monetary rewards to end the conflict. While the gifts were taken the rebel officers ignored Li Jing's edict.

The conflict between Ma Xi'e and Ma Xichong provided a precipitous opportunity for the Southern Tang. An envoy was sent from Hengshan by Ma Xi'e to seek aid in defeating his brother. Upon learning of the coup Liu Yan rallied his troops in Langzhou and marched to Tanzhou. He demanded that Ma Xichong execute a number of officers close to Ma Xi'e. While the apprehensive Ma Xichong complied, Langzhou troops continued to advance. Fearing both his generals, particularly Xu Wei (徐威), and Liu Yan, Ma Xichong pleaded for assistance from the Southern Tang and offered the annexation of Chu. Bian Hao's army stationed in Yuanzhou was now mobilized and began to advance on Tanzhou. Chu emissaries welcomed the Southern Tang army as it approached. A letter of surrender reached Bian prior to his arrival at Tanzhou on November 16, 951. Ma Xichong led a group of his younger brothers and nephews to greet Bian outside the city. The following day Bian entered Tanzhou and ascended the tower at Liuyang Gate (瀏陽門) to pronounce Southern Tang forces' arrival, signaling the end of the Ma family's rule. As the people were then suffering from starvation due to the lengthy civil war, Bian opened up the food storage and distributed the grain previously stored by the Chu princes to the people, gaining their support.

In the aftermath of Ma Xichong's surrender, Ma Xi'e hoped that he would regain power in Tanzhou. However, the people of Tanzhou were resentful of his prior rule, and petitioned the Southern Tang to put Bian Hao in command. Li Jing therefore commissioned Bian as the jiedushi of Wu'an Circuit (武安), headquartered at Tanzhou. In December 951 Ma Xichong and his clan were ordered to relocate to Jinling. They tried to bribe Bian to stay in Tanzhou but, with a sarcastic smile, he stated to Ma Xichong:

The Empire and Your Lordship's state had been enemies for over 60 years. But the Empire did not dare to even think of coveting Your Lordship's state. Now, Your Lordship and your brothers have fought this internecine war, and you decided to submit because you are in extreme distress. If you are allowed to recover even two or three tenths of your strength, what might happen cannot be predicted.

Ma Xichong had no convincing response, and later sailed to Jinling with his clan. Bian subsequently sent the officer Li Chengjian (李承戩) to Hengshan. Ma Xi'e was ordered to travel to Jinling as well. Apparently intimidated, he took his army to visit Tanzhou and then traveled to Jinling. Once at the Southern Tang court, Li Jing didn't allow either Ma brother to return to Hunan. Ma Xi'e was permitted to use the title of Prince of Chu, but was moved to Zhennan Circuit (鎮南), headquartered in modern Nanchang. Ma Xichong and other former Chu officials also received appointments in the Southern Tang bureaucracy.

== Temporary rule ==
The entrance of Bian Hao into Tanzhou secured the Wu'an Circuit for the Southern Tang but other Chu territories remained outside their grasp. Liu Yan controlled the Wuping Circuit from Langzhou. Meanwhile Jingjiang (靜江), headquartered in modern Guilin, fell into Southern Han hands in winter 951. Nonetheless, the relative ease in defeating Chu made some Southern Tang officials arrogantly believe that they would soon destroy other neighboring states. Others however harbored reservations about how the campaigns were draining the state treasuries. At a ceremony celebrating the success of incorporating Chu, Li Jianxun warned that "this is where misfortune starts!"

Unrest brewed in Tanzhou. The Southern Tang managed their new conquests "not as a new part of their empire, but as a defeated state." Much of the treasures and stored wealth of Chu were exported to the Southern Tang capital of Jinling. The expenses of the occupying army were covered by additional taxes on the people of Hunan. Rations and payments to local troops, many formerly Chu, were decreased. A conspiracy to kill Bian Hao and then submit to Later Zhou was formed by disenchanted soldiers. When they revolted in spring 952, however, Bian realized what was occurring and successfully defended against the attack. Realizing they could not defeat him, the rebels fled to Langzhou, which was under the control of Liu Yan. Later that year a petition presented to Li Jing pointed out that Bian was indecisive, incompetent, and unable to rein in his subordinates. It was argued that Bian needed to be replaced or the former Chu realm would be lost. Li took no heed.

=== Southern Han expansionism ===
The Southern Han desired Chu territories, especially the lands south of the Nanling Mountains. In fall 948 Liu Sheng requested a marriage alliance with Ma Xiguang, which was refused. In retaliation a Southern Han force under the general Wu Huai'en (吳懷恩) attacked Chu later that year. The Hezhou and Zhaozhou prefectures in modern Guangxi were successfully captured.

In winter 951 Liu Sheng launched another invasion, successfully removing the Southern Tang from Lingnan. Afterwards, the Southern Han defeated the Southern Tang at Yizhang, and captured Chenzhou. Bian Hao subsequently requested that prefects be commissioned at Quan and Dao prefectures to defend against the Southern Han. Li Jing remained indecisive about launching a counterattack against the Southern Han. He wavered towards accepting the loss of the Jingjiang Circuit but was dissuaded from doing so by Feng Yanji. In 952 a Southern Tang army was dispatched from Juzhou to reclaim the Jingjiang circuit from the Southern Han. However, this campaign ended in complete failure after an attack on Guilin was repelled in an ambush by Southern Han at heavy losses to Southern Tang. The Southern Han were thus able to secure their gains made in the former Chu domain.

=== Defeat ===
A coalition of former Chu troops gathered in Langzhou. Liu Yan served as the Wuping Circuit jiedushi after deposing the figurehead Ma Guanghui and initially proclaimed loyalty to the Southern Tang. When rebels from Tanzhou arrived at Langzhou they submitted to Liu Yan. They gave information about the corrupt Southern Tang administration which was deeply flawed with improper policies. It was argued that Tanzhou could be easily taken.

After Liu Yan was summoned to Jinling, he launched a preemptive strike to capture Tanzhou late in 952. Southern Tang positions along the way quickly collapsed. Yuanjiang fell to the invaders on 26 October. After briefly defending Tanzhou, Bian decided to abandon the city on 1 November. Yuzhou fell shortly afterwards. Without control of either city the Southern Tang administration of Hunan crumbled. Upon learning that Tanzhou fell, other Southern Tang prefects abandoned their postings. This allowed Liu Yan to recover nearly all Chu territory north of the Nanling Mountains, with lands south of them controlled by the Southern Han. He submitted to the Later Zhou in order to protect against a potentially revanchist Southern Tang.

== Aftermath ==
Thus Li Jing's effort to control Hunan ended in an embarrassing rout. The Southern Tang, in effect, gained nothing from the Chu adventure. Bian Hao was stripped of his commissions and exiled to Raozhou. Sun Sheng and Feng Yanji resigned their chancellorships, and Li stated that he would never launch another army.

Tanzhou was ravaged from the recent sieges. Liu Yan secured permission from Taizu of the Later Zhou to relocate operations of the Wuping Circuit to Langzhou. Liu continued as the Jiedushi of the Wuping Circuit until being murdered by his officers in 953. Subsequent jiedushi of Wuping remained loyal to the Later Zhou and later the Song dynasty. In 963 the Song conquered Jingnan and advanced south into Hunan. The final Wuping jiedushi, Zhou Baoquan (周保權), was a 12 year old boy and eventually surrendered. The former Chu realm became absorbed into the Song dynasty.

== Bibliography ==
=== Premodern sources ===
- Sima, Guang (1084). Zīzhì Tōngjiàn (in Chinese) – via Wikisource.

=== Books ===
- Clark, Hugh R. (2009). "The Southern Kingdoms between the T'ang and the Sung, 907–979". In Twitchett, Denis; Smith, Paul J. (eds.). The Sung Dynasty and its Precursors, 907–1279, Part 1. The Cambridge History of China. Vol. 5. New York: Cambridge University Press. pp. 133–205. ISBN 978-0-521-81248-1.
- Kurz, Johannes L. (2011). China's Southern Tang Dynasty (937-976). Routledge. ISBN 9780415454964.
- Kurz, Johannes (2016a). "On the Unification Plans of the Southern Tang Dynasty". Journal of Asian History. 50 (1): 23–45. doi:10.13173/jasiahist.50.1.0023. JSTOR 10.13173/jasiahist.50.1.0023.
- Ouyang, Xiu (2004). Historical Records of the Five Dynasties. Translated by Davis, Richard L. New York: Columbia University Press. ISBN 0-231-12826-6.
