= Bian Hao =

10th-century Chinese general

Bian Hao (Chinese: 邊鎬), nickname Kangle (康樂), was a general of the Chinese Southern Tang dynasty. Early in his career, he distinguished himself in campaigns against the agrarian army leader Zhang Yuxian and against Southern Tang's southeastern neighbor Min. Later, during Ma Chu's collapse, Bian was able to enter its territory and, for some time, secured the nominal submission of all former Ma Chu territory to the Southern Tang. However, he was unable to deal with subsequent uprisings in the former Ma Chu realm and had to abandon it, causing him to be exiled for some time. He also fared poorly after he returned to the Southern Tang army, as he was defeated and captured by Later Zhou forces when the Later Zhou invaded the Southern Tang and eventually forced the latter's submission as a vassal. After he was returned to the Southern Tang, he had no further army commissions.

== Early career ==
It is not known when Bian Hao was born, but it is known that he was from Sheng Prefecture (昇州, in modern Nanjing, Jiangsu, i.e., the later Southern Tang capital Jinling). When he was born, his father dreamed of the Liu Song official Xie Lingyun coming to see him and offering to be his son. After he woke up, he believed that Bian Hao's appearance looked like the man in the dream, and therefore gave Bian Hao the nickname of Kangle — as Xie's noble title was the Duke of Kangle. Bian Hao later served under the founding emperor of Li Bian for a long duration as his protocol officer (通事舍人, Tongshi Sheren), and became known for his understanding and dexterity. (It is not known whether his service to Li Bian was only during Li Bian's reign, or during Li Bian's prior regency in late Wu times.)

== Campaigns against Zhang Yuxian and Min ==
In 943, by which time Li Bian's son and successor Li Jing was emperor, there was an incursion by the agrarian rebels, led by Zhang Yuxian (as their king) and initially against Southern Tang's southern neighbor Southern Han, that entered Southern Tang territory. Zhang put Southern Tang's Baisheng Circuit (百勝, headquartered in modern Ganzhou, Jiangxi) under attack and built for himself a capital at Baiyun Cave (白雲洞, in modern Ganzhou), sending the agrarians under him to roam and pillage the territory. Li Jing commissioned the officer Yan En (嚴恩) to command the army against Zhang, with Bian Hao serving as Yan's army monitor (and, apparently, in actual decision-making capacity). Bian, employing Bai Changyu (白昌裕) as his chief strategist, repeatedly defeated Zhang, and, under further advice from Bai, cut a road through the forest and attack Zhang's army from the rear. Zhang fled to his follower Li Tai (李台), who, seeing the situation as hopeless, arrested Zhang and surrendered him to Southern Tang. (Zhang was subsequently taken to Jinling and executed.)

Subsequently, Bian apparently became the discipline officer of the Southern Tang army stationed at Hong Prefecture (洪州, in modern Nanchang, Jiangxi). In 944, with Southern Tang's southeastern neighbor Min deeply divided by a civil war (with the general Zhu Wenjin having assassinated the emperor Wang Xi and claimed the title of Emperor of Min himself at Min's traditional capital Fu Prefecture (福州, in modern Fuzhou, Fujian), and with Wang Xi's younger brother Wang Yanzheng having claimed the title of Emperor of Yin at Jian Prefecture (建州, in modern Nanping, Fujian), although after Zhu's subsequent assassination he reclaimed the title of Emperor of Min), the Southern Tang general Cha Wenhui (查文徽) advocated a campaign against Wang Yanzheng. Li Jing agreed and commissioned Cha to command the army against Wang. Bian was assigned to serve under Cha, as the army's discipline officer. In fall 945, Bian captured Xin Prefecture (鐔州, in modern Nanping), and participated in the subsequent capture of Jian, which forced Wang's surrender. It was said that all of the officers argued for credit for their achievements during the campaign, but Bian was silent.

== Takeover of Chu and subsequent abandonment ==
By 951, another Southern Tang neighboring state — Chu, to its southwest — had been devastated by a civil war between brothers Ma Xiguang and Ma Xi'e. Ma Xi'e eventually prevailed, with Southern Tang support, and therefore, in 951, sent his secretary Liu Guangfu (劉光輔) to Jinling to submit tributes to Li Jing. Li Jing welcomed Liu with respect, and Liu secretly told him, "Hunan [(i.e., the Chu realm)] has tired people and an arrogant lord. It can be taken." Li thereafter commissioned Bian Hao as the prefect of Xin Prefecture (信州, in modern Shangrao, Jiangxi), but stationed him and his troops at Yuan Prefecture (袁州, in modern Yichun, Jiangxi), in anticipation of a potential chance to strike.

Later in the year, Ma Xi'e, who angered the people by his viciousness, particularly against prior enemies, and was himself overthrown in a coup led by his brother Ma Xichong, who seized the throne. However, he faced armed opposition from the general Liu Yan, who controlled Wuping Circuit (武平, headquartered in modern Changde, Hunan), and of a group of generals who supported Ma Xi'e and redeclared him prince in the Mount Heng region. Further, Ma Xichong himself alienated the people by being unfair in his governance and by his frivolousness and drunkenness. Several generals who supported Ma Xichong's coup, led by Xu Wei (徐威), were concerned that Ma Xichong could not possibly prevail against the Wuping and Mount Heng forces, and therefore considered killing him. Ma Xichong became aware that a plot was occurring. In fear, he sent his officer Fan Shoumu (范守牧) to the Southern Tang court, offering to submit the realm. Li thereafter ordered Bian to take his army into the Chu capital Changsha. When Bian arrived, Ma Xichong opened the city and welcomed him in, surrendering the realm to him and ending Chu. As the people were then suffering from starvation due to the lengthy civil war, Bian opened up the food storage and distributed the grain previously stored by the Chu princes to the people, gaining their support.

In the aftermaths of Ma Xichong's surrender, Ma Xi'e hoped that Li would restore him to power at Changsha. However, the people of Changsha were resentful of Ma Xi'e's rule, and therefore submitted a petition that Bian be put in command. Li therefore commissioned Bian as the military governor (Jiedushi) of Wu'an Circuit (武安, headquartered at Changsha). He subsequently ordered Ma Xichong and his clan to move to Jinling. They tried to bribe him to be able to stay at Changsha, but he, with a sarcastic smile, stated to Ma Xichong:

The Empire and Your Lordship's state had been enemies for over 60 years. But the Empire did not dare to even think of coveting Your Lordship's state. Now, Your Lordship and your brothers had fought this internecine war, and you decided to submit because you are in extreme distress. If you are allowed to recover even two or three tenths of your strength, what might happen cannot be predicted.

Ma Xichong had no convincing response to him. Shortly after, they were placed on ships and sent to Jinling, with both they and their senders-off crying bitterly and loudly. He subsequently also sent the officer Li Chengjian (李承戩) to Mount Heng to order Ma Xi'e to report to Jinling as well. Ma Xi'e, apparently intimidated, took his army and, after first visiting Changsha, reported to Jinling as well.

In the aftermaths of Chu's fall, Chu's southern neighbor Southern Han's emperor Liu Sheng also had design on parts of Chu territory, and in winter 951, the Southern Han generals Pang Chongche (潘崇徹) and Xie Guan (謝貫) captured Chen Prefecture (郴州, in modern Chenzhou, Hunan), notwithstanding Bian's attempt to resist the attack. Subsequently, at Bian's request that prefects be commissioned at Quan (全州, in modern Guilin, Guangxi) and Dao (道州, in modern Yongzhou, Hunan) to defend against future attacks by Southern Han, Li commissioned the general Liao Yan (廖偃, one of Ma Xi'e's supporters) as the prefect of Dao and the officer Zhang Luan (張巒) as the acting prefect of Quan.

Trouble would soon brew for Bian at Changsha itself as well. After Bian's takeover, much of the treasures and stored wealth of Chu were delivered to Jinling. The official Yang Jixun (楊繼勳) collected taxes from the people of the Hunan region to pay the expenses of the occupying army, disappointing the people of Hunan. Further, the supply officer Wang Shaoyan (王紹顏) was decreasing the food and money supplies to the soldiers. Two officers, Sun Lang (孫朗) and Cao Jin (曹進), thereafter entered a conspiracy to kill Bian and Wang, and then submit to Later Zhou. When they rose in uprising in spring 952, however, Bian realized what was occurring and successfully defended against the attack. Sun and Wang, realizing they could not defeat him, fled to Wuping's capital Lang Prefecture (朗州) and submitted to Liu Yan. They revealed to Liu's general Wang Kui that the Southern Tang imperial administration itself was deeply flawed with corruption and improper policies and argued that Changsha could be easily taken. Later in the year, one Ouyang Guang (歐陽廣) submitted a petition to Li Jing, pointing out that Bian was indecisive, incompetent, and unable to rein in his subordinates and arguing that Bian needed to be replaced, or that the former Chu realm would be lost. Li took no heed.

Meanwhile, though, as Liu was nominally submissive to Li, Bian did not expect a potential attack from him. When Li sent emissaries to Lang to summon Liu to Jinling, however, Liu refused, and, after informing Wang and another general, Zhou Xingfeng, that he would thus expect an attack from Southern Tang, Wang and Zhou advocated an attack against Bian. Liu decided to launch an attack, and sent Wang, Zhou, and eight other generals, with Sun and Cao serving as their guides, quickly toward Changsha. The Southern Tang positions along the way quickly collapsed, and Bian, after briefly defending the city but having no prospect of reinforcement, decided to abandon Changsha and flee, allowing Wang to enter Changsha and take it over and ending Southern Tang's brief control of the region.

In the aftermaths, Li stripped Bian of his commissions and exiled him to Rao Prefecture (饒州, in modern Shangrao). It was said that, because Bian was a devout Buddhist, he often guided his actions by Buddhist principles of mercy. When he followed Cha in the campaign against Min, he tried to save as many people from death as possible, and therefore gained the nickname of "Arhat Bian" from the people of Jian. When he took over Changsha, he made sure that the people were comforted and that not even the daily business routines were disrupted, and therefore gained the nickname of "Bodhisattva Bian" from the people of Changsha. But after he became governor, his rule lacked proper principles, and he spent all day offering sacrifices to deities. In disappointment, the people of Changsha nicknamed him, "Monk Bian."

== Campaign against Later Zhou ==
In 956, with Southern Tang facing a major invasion by Later Zhou's emperor Guo Rong, Li Jing commissioned his younger brother Li Jingda the Prince of Qi to command an army resisting the Later Zhou invasion, but with the official Chen Jue as Li Jingda's army monitor and effectively in actual command of the army. Bian Hao was made the army commander serving below Li Jingda and Chen. Li Jingda's army subsequently headed for the vicinity of Shou Prefecture (壽州, in modern Lu'an, Anhui), which had been under Later Zhou siege from the start of the war, as it sat on the Later Zhou/Southern Tang border. However, Li Jingda's army was unable to lift the siege against the Later Zhou general Li Chongjin. As another Later Zhou army, commanded by Guo himself, was set to arrive to renew the effort to capture the city, Shou's defender Liu Renshan proposed that Bian enter the city and defend it, while Liu himself make a preemptive attack against the Later Zhou army, but Li Jingda refused to grant approval.

As of spring 957, Shou Prefecture was in a desperate position, as it was running out of food, and Liu himself was falling ill. However, the Later Zhou army was still not able to defeat the Southern Tang army, until the Southern Tang general Zhu Yuan, fearful that he would be stripped of his command because of his strained relationship with Chen, defected to Later Zhou. The Later Zhou army then attacked Li Jingda's army, and it collapsed. Li Jingda and Chen fled back to Jinling. Bian, along with other generals Xu Wenzhen (許文稹) and Yang Shouzhong (楊守忠), was captured. With Liu deathly ill, the Shou garrison surrendered.

In winter 958, after a peace agreement had been entered between the two states (with Li Jing submitting to Guo as a vassal and ceding the land north of the Yangtze River to Later Zhou), Guo returned Bian, Xu, and Liu's army monitor Zhou Tinggou (周廷構) to Southern Tang. However, Li Jing considered Bian and Xu to be losing generals unworthy of restoration, and therefore did not restore their commissions for the rest of their lives. Bian later died at Jinling.

== Notes and references ==
- Spring and Autumn Annals of the Ten Kingdoms, vol. 22.
- Zizhi Tongjian, vols. 283, 284, 290, 291, 293, 294.
