= Li Jing (Southern Tang) =

Emperor of Southern Tang from 943 to 961

Emperor Yuanzong of Southern Tang 南唐元宗
- Emperor of (Southern) Tang (more...)
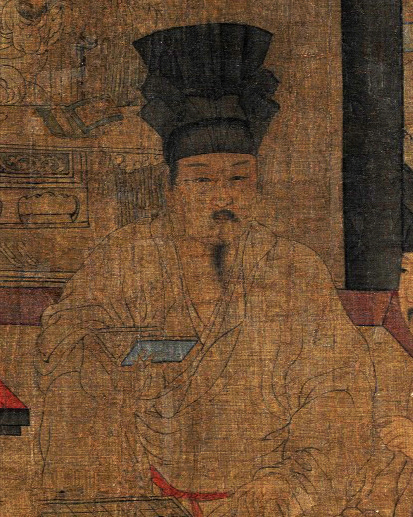
- Li Jing, detail from a larger painting by Zhou Wenju (fl. 942-961)

2nd ruler of Southern Tang
- Reign: 943 – 961
- Predecessor: Li Bian (Emperor Liezu), father
- Successor: Li Yu, son
- Born: Xu Jingtong (徐景通); 916 or January 917; Probably Sheng Prefecture, possibly Guangling
- Died: August 12, 961 (Aged 44–45); Nanchang
- Burial: Shun Mausoleum (順陵, in modern Jiangning District, Nanjing, Jiangsu)
- Spouse: Empress Zhong
- Concubine: Lady Ling (凌氏)
- Issue Among others: Li Hongji, son; Li Hongmao (李弘茂), son; Li Yu, son; Li Congshan, son; Li Congyi (李從益), son; Li Congqian (李從謙), son; Li Congdu (李從度), son; Li Congxin (李從信), son
Names
- Surname: Xú (徐), changed to Lǐ (李) with father Given name: Jǐngtōng (景通), changed to Yáo (瑤), then to Jǐng (璟), and eventually to Jǐng (景)
Era dates
- Bǎodà (保大): 943–957; Zhōngxīng (中興): 958; Jiāotài (交泰): 958; Adopted the era name of Later Zhou: Xiǎndé (顯德): 958–960; Adopted the era name of Song: Jiànlóng (建隆): 960–961
Regnal name
- Emperor (before 958); King of Tang (唐國主) (after 958)
Posthumous name
- Emperor Míngdào Chóngdé Wénxuān Xiào (明道崇德文宣孝皇帝)
Temple name
- Yuánzōng (元宗)
- House: Li (by birth); Xu (adoptive)
- Dynasty: Southern Tang
- Father: Li Bian
- Mother: Empress Song

Li Jing (Chinese: 李璟, later changed to 李景; 916 – August 12, 961), originally Xu Jingtong (徐景通), briefly Xu Jing (徐璟) in 937–939, courtesy name Boyu (伯玉), also known by his temple name as the Emperor Yuanzong of Southern Tang (南唐元宗), also known in historiography as the Middle Lord of Southern Tang (南唐中主), was the second and penultimate monarch of China's Southern Tang dynasty during the Five Dynasties and Ten Kingdoms period. He reigned his state from 943 until his death.

During Li Jing's earlier reign, he expanded Southern Tang's borders by conquering smaller neighboring states: Min in 945 and Ma Chu in 951. However, the warfare also exhausted the wealth of the country, leaving it ill-prepared to resist the Later Zhou invasion in 956. Forced to cede all prefectures north of the Yangtze River, he also had to relinquish his title as an emperor and accept the Later Zhou's overlordship in 958, and later the Northern Song's overlordship after 960.

== Family ==
Parents

- Father: Li Bian
- Mother: Empress Yuanjing, of the Song clan (元敬皇后 宋氏), personal name Song Fujin (宋福金)

Wives

- Empress Guangmu, of the Zhong clan (光穆皇后; 鍾氏, d. 965)
  - Li Hongji, Crown Prince Wenxian (文獻太子 李弘冀, d. 959), 1st son
  - Li Yu, Prince of Tang (唐國主 李煜, 937 – 15 August 978), 5th son
  - Li Congqian, Duke of E (鄂國公 李從謙), 9th son
- Lady Ling, of the Ling clan (凌氏)
  - Li Congshan, Duke of Nanchu (南楚國公 李從善, 940 – 987), 7th son
- Unknown:
  - Li Hongmao, Prince of Qing (慶王 李弘茂), 2nd son
  - Third son
  - Li Congqin, Duke of Zhaoping (昭平郡公 李從慶), 4th son
  - Li Liangzuo (李良佐) sixth son
  - Li Congyi, Duke of Jiang (江國公 李從鎰), 8th son
  - Li Congxin, Duke of Wenyang (文陽郡公 李從信), 10th son
  - Li Congfu (李從甫), 11th son
  - Princess Taining (太寧公主), 3d daughter
    - Married Liu Jie (劉節), a son of Liu Chongjun (劉崇俊)
  - Princess Yongjia (永嘉公主), 4th daughter
  - Princess Li
    - married a man surnamed Sun (孫)
    - married Shengzong of Liao and had issue (a daughter)

== Background ==
Li Jing, then named Xu Jingtong, was born in 916. His father Xu Zhigao was then Wu's prefect of Sheng Prefecture (昇州, in modern Nanjing, Jiangsu), under his adoptive father (Xu Jingtong's grandfather) Xu Wen, who was then Wu's regent. He was Xu Zhigao's oldest son. His mother was Xu Zhigao's second wife Song Fujin, who would later give birth to three more sons, Xu Jingqian, Xu Jingsui, and Xu Jingda.

== During Wu ==
In 923, by which time Xu Zhigao was the junior regent under Xu Wen, there was an incident where the general Zhong Taizhang (鍾泰章), who had assisted in Xu Wen's coming to power, was under investigation for corruption. Xu Zhigao advocated punishing Zhong, but Xu Wen, pointing out Zhong's contributions, declined, and instead ordered Xu Zhigao to take one of Zhong's daughters as wife for Xu Jingtong, although it is not clear whether the marriage took place that year or later. In 925, Xu Jingtong, then age nine, was given the office of Jiabu Langzhong (駕部郎中), a supervisory official at the ministry of defense (兵部, Bingbu). He later was given the title of an imperial guard general. In 930, by which point Xu Zhigao had succeeded Xu Wen as regent, Xu Zhigao planned to leave the Wu capital Jiangdu (江都, in modern Yangzhou, Jiangsu) and take up his headquarters at Jinling (i.e., the former Sheng Prefecture), he started the preparations of leaving Xu Jingtong at Jiangdu as junior regent by having him given the titles of minister of defense (兵部尚書, Bingbu Shangshu) and acting chancellor (參政事, Can Zhengshi). In 931, when Xu Zhigao's chief advisor Song Qiqiu suddenly claimed to want to retire, it was Xu Jingtong that Xu Zhigao sent to Song's retirement mansion to urge Song to return to the government. Later in the year, Xu Zhigao left Jiangdu and took up headquarters at Jinling, leaving Xu Jingtong at Jiangdu to oversee the government, assisted by Song and Wang Lingmou. Xu Jingtong received the titles of Situ (司徒, one of the Three Excellencies), chancellor (同中書門下平章事, Tong Zhongshu Menxia Pingzhangshi), and acting director of military matters (知中外左右諸軍事, Zhi Zhongwai Zuoyou Zhujunshi).

In late 934, Xu Zhigao summoned Xu Jingtong from Jiangdu to Jinling, to serve as his deputy at Jinling, with the titles of deputy military governor of Zhenhai (鎮海, headquartered in modern Zhenjiang, Jiangsu) and Ningguo (寧國, headquartered in modern Xuancheng, Anhui) Circuits, deputy commander of the armies of all circuits (諸道副都統, Zhudao Fu Dutong), and acting overseer of military matters (判中外諸軍事, Pan Zhongwai Zhujunshi). His younger brother Xu Jingqian was made junior regent at Jiangdu in his place.

In late 935, as part of the prelude of taking over the Wu throne, Xu Zhigao had Wu's emperor Yang Pu bestow on him the titles of Prince of Qi and Generalissimo (大元帥, Da Yuanshuai). In early 936, as he began to create a Generalissimo headquarters with six ministries, he made Xu Jingtong the deputy generalissimo and Taiwei (太尉, one of the Three Excellencies). In 937, he created Xu Jingtong the crown prince of the Principality of Qi, but Xu Jingtong declined.

== During Li Bian's reign as emperor ==
In winter 937, Xu Zhigao had Yang Pu yield the throne to him, ending Wu, and starting a new state later known as Southern Tang (although it was likely known as Qi at this point). Sometimes around the transition, Xu Jingtong was apparently given the titles of commander of all circuits (諸道都統, Zhudao Dutong) and acting generalissimo, and shortly after the transition, he was given the titles of deputy generalissimo, overseer of the imperial guards, Taiwei, Shangshu Ling (尚書令), and Prince of Wu. Shortly after, his name was changed from Jingtong to Jing. In 938, his princely title was changed to Prince of Qi.

In 939, Xu Zhigao changed his surname from the adoptive Xu to the birth Li and took a new personal name of Bian (and likely changed the name of the state to Tang at that point). Xu Jing, and the rest of the imperial family (other than the lines from Xu Wen's biological sons) changed their names to Li at that time as well. Li Bian decreed that all the matters of state be submitted to Li Jing for decision, except that he himself would still oversee military matters. Later in the year, Li Bian wanted to create him to be the crown prince, but he declined, and so Li Bian gave him a number of additional titles—Generalissimo, acting commander of the imperial guards, acting Taiwei, director of the executive bureau of government (錄尚書事, Lu Shangshu Shi), and grand prefect of Sheng and Yang Prefectures (i.e., Jinling and Jiangdu). In fall 940, Li Bian created him crown prince, while having him continue to retain the titles of Generalissimo and Lu Shangshu Shi, but he again declined, and so Li Bian allowed him to but ordered that the entire realm honor him as if he were crown prince. In late 940, there was an occasion when the fortuneteller Sun Zhiyong (孫智永) claimed, due to planet alignments, that Li Bian should visit Jiangdu. Li Bian agreed, and left Li Jing in charge of the state as regent at Jinling, while he headed for Jiangdu. He considered taking up residence there for some time, but because supplying Jiangdu at that time was difficult due to freezing conditions, he soon thereafter returned to Jinling.

In 942, when Song Qiqiu complained that he was not given sufficient authority, Li Bian put Song in charge of overseeing the executive bureau (尚書省, Shangshu Sheng), while having Li Jing's younger brother Li Jingsui oversee the two other bureaus of government—the legislative (中書省, Zhongshu Sheng) and examination (門下省, Menxia Sheng), with Li Jing in charge of reviewing Song's and Li Jingsui's decisions. (However, this arrangement did not last long, as, later in the year, Song's associate Xia Changtu (夏昌圖) was accused of corruption, but Song refused to execute him. Li Bian, in anger, directly ordered Xia's execution, and after this incident, Song requested retirement and was allowed to retire.)

In any case, though, over the years, Song had often praised the abilities of Li Jing's younger brother Li Jingda, whom Li Bian himself considered resolute and magnanimous and therefore considered making his heir. While it did not actually occur, as Li Jing was older, Li Jing was resentful to Song for making the suggestion. Once, however, when Li Bian visited Li Jing's palace, he happened to see Li Jing playing instruments—which Li Bian considered frivolous, and therefore rebuked Li Jing for several straight days. Li Bian's favorite concubine Consort Zhong, who had given birth to Li Bian's youngest son Li Jingti (李景逷), took this opportunity to try to persuade Li Bian to divert succession from Li Jing to Li Jingti—which, however, angered Li Bian, who stated, "When a son has faults, the father rebukes him. This is normal. How can a woman interfere with important matters of state?" He sent her away and gave her in marriage to someone else. Meanwhile, Li Jing's staff members Chen Jue and Feng Yanji were in alliance with Song and finding ways to expel people who were not cooperating with them. Both Chang Mengxi (常夢錫) and Xiao Yan (蕭儼) submitted petitions to Li Bian accusing Chen of abuse of power, and it was said that while Li Bian understood some of the accusations to be true, he did not get a chance to act on them, before he fell deathly ill in spring 943 from poisoning due to pills given him by alchemists. On March 30, he summoned Li Jing to his deathbed, and, after entrusting the state to him, died. Li Jing did not immediately announce his death, but instead issued an edict in his name naming Li Jing regent and announcing a general pardon. Meanwhile, the official Sun Sheng, trying to stop the influence by Chen and the others on the incoming emperor, considered trying to announce that Li Bian's will named Empress Song regent for Li Jing, but when the official Li Yiye (李貽業) pointed out that Li Bian often spoke against women's influence on governments and stated that he would publicly tear up the will if it were announced, Sun relented. Shortly after, Li Jing announced Li Bian's death, and then took the throne.

== Reign ==
=== Early reign ===
Upon taking the throne, Li Jing honored his mother Empress Song as empress dowager, and created his wife Princess Zhong empress. As he considered Song Qiqiu and Zhou Zong to be the most respected senior officials of the land, he made them his leading chancellors (as Zhongshu Ling (中書令) and Shizhong (侍中), respectively), but decided the main decisions himself. He gave greater princely titles to his brothers Li Jingsui (from Prince of Shou to Prince of Yan) and Li Jingda (from Prince of Xuancheng to Prince of E). It was said after he took the throne, he entrusted much responsibility to Chen Jue, and a group of his associates thus emerged from this association—Chen, Feng Yanji, Feng Yanji's brother Feng Yanlu (馮延魯), Wei Cen (魏岑), and Cha Wenhui (查文徽)—who became influential at his court, influencing him to benefit themselves, such that they became known as the "Five Ghosts". However, soon thereafter, when Chen left governmental service for some time to observe a mourning period for his mother, the alliance fractured, as Wei took the opportunity to defame Chen. With Chen gone, and with Li Jing unhappy with Song Qiqiu's repeated attempt to defame Zhou, Li Jing sent Song outside Jinling to serve as the military governor of Zhenhai, and then, when Song submitted a retirement request in anger, approved it.

Later in the year, believing that it was Li Bian's wish that he pass the throne to his brothers eventually, Li Jing made Li Jingsui Generalissimo and Prince of Qi, and had him move into the eastern palace—i.e., the palace of the Crown Prince—and created Li Jingda the Prince of Yan. He publicly declared that he intended to pass the throne to the two of them, in order, despite their attempts to decline their greater titles. Li Jingsui thereafter took, as his courtesy name, "Tuishen" (退身, "withdrawing body"), to show that he had no intent to occupy the position. Li Jing also created his oldest son Li Hongji the Prince of Nanchang, and youngest brother Li Jingti the Prince of Baoning. It was said that because Empress Dowager Song resented Consort Zhong for attempt to try to displace Li Jing with Li Jingti, she considered killing Li Jingti, but Li Jingti survived with Li Jing's protection.

In winter 943, with the agrarian rebel leader Zhang Yuxian—who had earlier plagued Southern Tang's southern neighbor Southern Han—now inside his realm, Li Jing sent the officer Yan En (嚴恩) to attack Zhang, with the official Bian Hao serving as Yan's army monitor. Bian, using one Bai Changyu (白昌裕) as his chief strategist, attacked Zhang and defeated him. Zhang was then arrested and surrendered by his own subordinate Li Tai (李台), and was taken to Jinling and executed there.

In spring 944, Feng Yanji, Wei, and Cha were trying to monopolize access to the emperor, and they took advance of Li Jing's desire to pass the throne to Li Jingsui and Li Jingda to persuade him to issue an edict that stated, "Li Jingsui the Prince of Qi should oversee all matters. Among the officials, only the deputy chiefs of staff Wei Cen and Cha Wenhui may come to us to present matters; otherwise, they can only see us by our summons." This greatly shocked the state, and Xiao Yan's petition to reverse this decision was ignored. However, the imperial guard commander Jia Chong (賈崇) went to the palace door and knelt, requesting an audience, and when Li Jing saw him, pointed out that this was ill-advised and would cut off the rest of the government from him, causing Li Jing to withdraw this policy.

Later in the year, with Southern Tang's southeastern neighbor Min embroiled in a civil war between its emperor Wang Xi and Wang Xi's brother Wang Yanzheng, who had declared himself emperor of a new state of Yin, Li Jing sent them letters, rebuking them for a fraternal civil war and urging them to make peace. Neither listened: Wang Xi wrote back and invoked the precedents of the Duke of Zhou executing his rebellious brothers Lord Guan and Lord Cai, and Emperor Taizong of Tang killing his brothers Li Jiancheng and Li Yuanji, while Wang Yanzheng wrote back and rebuked Li Jing (and his father Li Bian) for usurping the Wu throne. In anger, Li Jing cut off diplomatic relations with Yin. In summer 944, after Wang Xi was assassinated by his general Zhu Wenjin, who then claimed the Min throne, Zhu sent emissaries to Southern Tang, hoping to establish relations. Li Jing arrested Zhu's emissaries and considered attacking him, but as there were hot weather and plagues at the time, Southern Tang did not actually attack.

In late 944, Cha made a proposal to attack Yin's capital Jian Prefecture (建州, in modern Nanping, Fujian), and, despite much opposition, Li sent him to oversee the borders with Yin to see if such a plan were feasible. When Cha reached Xin Prefecture (信州, in modern Shangrao, Jiangxi), near the Yin border, he submitted a report indicating his belief that an attack would be successful. Li thereafter sent Bian to command an army to rendezvous with Cha. However, their initial attacks were unsuccessful. The Yin general Wu Chengyi (吳成義), who was then attacking the Min capital Changle (長樂, in modern Fuzhou, Fujian), decided to use this opportunity to falsely claim to the people of Changle that Southern Tang was aiding Yin in the military efforts against Zhu, causing much alarm in Changle. The Min official Lin Renhan (林仁翰) used this opportunity to rise against Zhu, first killing Zhu's confederate Lian Chongyu, and then Zhu, and then opened the city to welcome Wu in. Shortly after, Wang Yanzheng claimed the Min throne, but kept his capital at Jian rather than moving it back to Changle. Soon thereafter, the Southern Tang general Zu Quan'en (祖全恩), whom Li sent to reinforce Cha, crushed the Min army commanded by Wang Yanzheng's chancellor Yang Sigong, and then put Jian under siege. In fall 945, Jian fell, and Wang Yanzheng surrendered to Southern Tang, ending Min's existence as a state. However, the pillages of the Southern Tang army of Jian disappointed the Min people, who had welcomed Southern Tang forces as liberators from the oppressive Min regime, but Li chose not to pursue charges against the officers responsible due to the great accomplishment of destroying Min.

Initially, the Min territory, after Jian's fall, pledged allegiance to Southern Tang. This included Fu Prefecture (福州, i.e., Changle), which had been under the control of Li Renda, who seized control of the prefecture when Jian was under Southern Tang attack, and whom Li Jing had, in response, given him a new hame of Hongyi and adopted him into the Southern Tang imperial clan. After Jian's fall, however, Fu remained out of effective control by Southern Tang. Chen Jue, who was then Li Jing's chief of staff (Shumishi), volunteered to go to meet Li Hongyi, promising that he would be able to persuade Li Hongyi to give up his semi-independence and go to Jinling to pay homage to Li Jing. When Chen reached Fu, however, Li Hongyi took a defiant stance and treated Chen with disrespect. Chen did not dare to speak of having him come to Jinling, but, when he reached Jian Prefecture (劍州, in modern Nanping) on the way back to Jinling, Chen felt humiliated, and issued an order in Li Jing's name, without authorization, claiming for himself the acting authority to oversee Fu, conscripting the militia soldiers in the region to head toward Fu, and ordering Li Hongyi to report to Jinling. When Li Hongyi resisted, battles began. Li Jing was incensed by Chen's issuing of orders without authority, but by that point, Southern Tang officials became supportive of Chen's endeavor, and so Li Jing sent reinforcements. Southern Tang forces put Fu under siege, but even though the general Wang Chongwen (王崇文) was in command of the entire operations, Chen, Feng Yanlu, and Wei Cen were all interfering with his authority, while the generals Wang Jianfeng (王建封) and Liu Congxiao were also resistant, causing the siege to lose focus and unable to succeed, so the siege wore on.

In spring 947, Li Jing formally created Li Jingsui his crown prince. He also created Li Jingda the Prince of Qi, and Li Hongji the Prince of Yan, with Li Jingda also serving as Generalissimo and Li Hongji his deputy. As the Khitan Liao dynasty had recently destroyed Southern Tang's northern neighbor Later Jin and taken over central China, Li Jing sent emissaries to congratulate Liao's Emperor Taizong, and also, as Li Bian claimed ancestry from Tang dynasty emperors, requested permission to send soldiers to repair the tombs of the Tang emperors. The Liao emperor refused, but still sent emissaries to Southern Tang in return. At this time, a number of Later Jin officials who did not want to submit to Liao fled to Southern Tang, and the agrarian rebels north of the Huai River (which formed the border between Southern Tang and Later Jin) were also pledging allegiance to Southern Tang. The official Han Xizai suggested that Southern Tang take an aggressive military stance to contest the central Chinese territories, but as the army was occupied with sieging Fu, such a campaign could not be carried out at the time, causing Li Jing much regret.

By late spring 947, forces from Wuyue, which Li Hongyi (who now carried the name of Li Da) had sought aid from, had arrived at Fu. The Southern Tang forces allowed the Wuyue forces to land, hoping to defeat them and then take the city. However, Wuyue forces, once they landed, attacked and defeated the Southern Tang forces, lifting the siege on Fu. Subsequently, Liu returned to his stronghold Quan Prefecture (泉州, in modern Quanzhou, Fujian) and forced the Southern Tang forces there to leave—thus, while he remained formally a Southern Tang subject, the modern southern Fujian region, which he controlled, was in effect semi-independent from that point on. (Thus, the only part of the former Min territory that Southern Tang had effective control of was the northwestern portion, centered around Jian Prefecture.) Li Jing, angry over the defeat, considered executing Chen and Feng Yanlu, but eventually, at the intercession of Song Qiqiu and Feng Yanji, only exiled them. When Li Jing subsequently heard that Liao abandoned the former Later Jin capital Daliang, he considered a campaign north, with the general Li Jinquan in command. However, he soon heard that the Later Jin general Liu Zhiyuan had entered Daliang and claimed imperial title (as founder of a new state of Later Han, and therefore, not daring to confront Liu, cancelled those plans.

After Liu Zhiyuan's death in early 948 and succession by his son Liu Chengyou, the Later Han general Li Shouzhen rebelled at Hezhong (河中, in modern Yuncheng, Shanxi), and sought aid from Southern Tang. Li Jing sent Li Jinquan to attack north. Li Jinquan's army entered Later Han territory and reached Yi Prefecture (沂州, in modern Linyi, Shandong), but with Hezhong being far away, across Later Han territory and with the Southern Tang soldiers having low morale, Li Jinquan soon thereafter withdrew back to Southern Tang territory. Li Jing subsequently wrote Liu Chengyou, apologizing for the incursion, asking for him to pardon Li Shouzhen, and requesting resumption of trade relations between Southern Tang and Later Han. Liu did not respond. Soon, Li Shouzhen was defeated by the Later Han general Guo Wei and committed suicide.

=== Middle reign ===
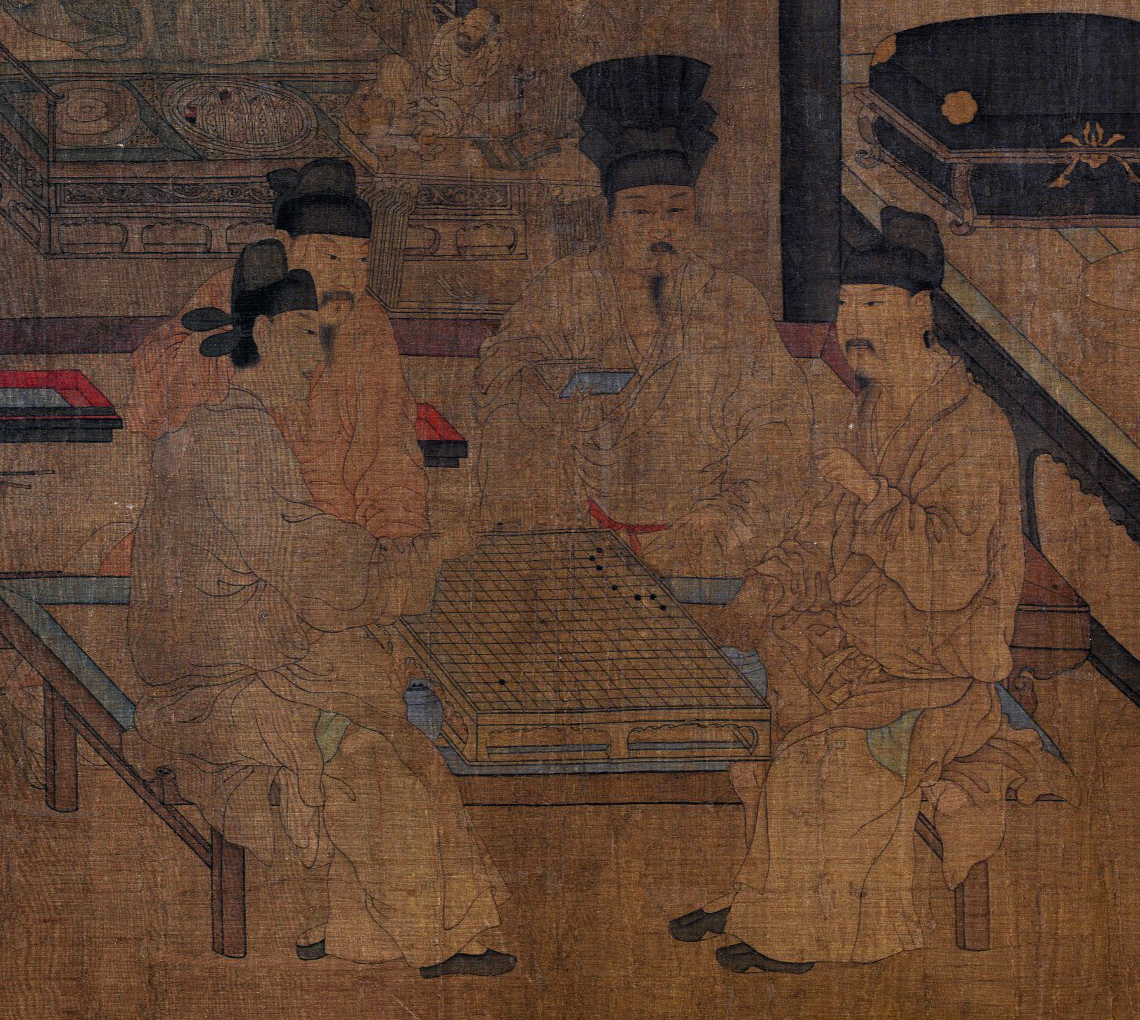
Li Jing playing weiqi with his brothers, detail from a larger painting by Zhou Wenju (fl. 942–961)

In 950, Cha Wenhui, then the acting military governor of Yong'an Circuit (永安, headquartered at Jian Prefecture), received false reports that Wuyue had abandoned Fu Prefecture, and decided to head for Fu to take control of it. When he approached, though, he fell into an ambush set by Wuyue's acting military governor of Weiwu Circuit (威武, headquartered at Fu), and was defeated and captured. Wuyue's king Qian Hongchu subsequently returned Cha, and, in return, Southern Tang returned a number of Wuyue officers that it had previously captured to Wuyue. (Southern Tang would not subsequently make another attempt at capturing the former Min capital.)

Meanwhile, Southern Tang's southwestern neighbor Chu had fallen into a civil war, as its then prince Ma Xiguang's older brother Ma Xi'e, upset that he was bypassed by their older brother Ma Xifan when Ma Xifan was choosing an heir, rebelled against Ma Xiguang in 949 and effectively made Wuping Circuit (武平, headquartered in modern Changde, Hunan), independent of the main Chu state. In spring 950, Ma Xi'e, after unable to get the Later Han emperor Liu Chengyou, to which Chu was a vassal of, to recognize him as an independent vassal, instead pledged fealty to Li Jing. Later in the year, he captured Chu's capital Tan Prefecture (潭州, in modern Changsha, Hunan), executed Ma Xiguang, and claimed the princely title for himself. He continued to be Southern Tang's vassal, and sent his secretary Liu Guangfu (劉光輔) to pay tribute to Li. Li, in return, sent the officials Sun Sheng and Yao Feng (姚鳳) to Tan to formally bestow the Prince of Chu title on Ma Xi'e. However, Liu secretly informed Li that the Chu realm was not secure, and so Li stationed Bian Hao at Yuan Prefecture (袁州, in modern Yichun, Jiangxi), in anticipation of a strike against Chu. Shortly after this, the Wuping officers Wang Kui and Zhou Xingfeng, upset that Ma Xi'e had driven the soldiers under them into hard labor and not properly rewarded them, escaped from Tan back to Wuping's capital Lang Prefecture (朗州) and seized it, deposing Ma Xi'e's son Ma Guangzan (馬光贊) as acting military governor, and replacing him, first with Ma Xi'e's nephew Ma Guanghui, but in fact having a group of officers exercise joint leadership. When Ma Xi'e reported this to Li, Li sent emissaries to Wuping with gifts, hoping that these officers would acknowledge him as overlord, but Wang and the others received the gifts and sent the emissaries back to Li without answering him. Wang and the other officers subsequently supported the general Liu Yan to be Wuping's military governor, and Liu sent an emissary requesting that Southern Tang commission him as military governor. When Li did not respond, he submitted to Later Han's successor state Later Zhou, founded and ruled by Guo Wei.

After taking Tan over, Ma Xi'e governed the Chu state with violence and incompetence, spending his days and nights feasting. In fall 950, a coup happened at Tan, overthrowing him. Ma Xi'e's younger brother Ma Xichong, who had been one of the conspirators against him, became the ruler of the regime. Ma Xichong exiled Ma Xi'e to Hengshan (衡山, in modern Hengyang, Hunan), hoping that the non-Han chieftain Peng Shigao (彭師暠), who had supported Ma Xiguang previously and therefore Ma Xi'e punished, and who was in control of the Hengshan region, would kill Ma Xi'e for him, but Peng instead supported Ma Xi'e to be the leader in resisting Ma Xichong. Upon hearing of the coup, Liu Yan took his troops and headed toward Tan, and Ma Xichong was apprehensive. At Liu's demand, Ma Xichong executed a number of officers close to Ma Xi'e, but that did not stop Liu's advance. With threats from Liu and Peng, Ma Xichong's fellow conspirators considered assassinating him. In fear, Ma Xichong sent his general Fan Shoumu (范守牧) to the Southern Tang court, requesting to submit his state to Southern Tang. Li sent Bian to Tan to accept the surrender, ending Chu as a state under the Ma family's rule. With the Chu realm suffering from famine due to the wars, Bian distributed the food that the Ma family had stored up, initially greatly pleasing the Chu people. Thereafter, when Ma Xi'e requested to be restored to be position of military governor of Wu'an Circuit (武安, headquartered at Tan), the people of Tan, hating Ma Xi'e for his previous misrule, requested that Bian remain as their military governor, and Li agreed. Li subsequently continued to allow Ma Xi'e to carry the title of Prince of Chu, but moved him to Zhennan Circuit (鎮南, headquartered in modern Nanchang, Jiangxi). He gave lesser offices to Ma Xichong and the other former Chu officials, moving them away from the former Chu lands. In light of Chu's fall, the Southern Tang officials, in a celebrating mode, became arrogant, believing that Southern Tang would soon be destroying other states, while some secretly harbored reservations about how the campaigns were draining the state.

In early 952, the Later Zhou general Murong Yanchao (Liu Zhiyuan's half-brother) rebelled against Later Zhou, and sought aid from Southern Tang. However, the Southern Tang relief army that Li Jing sent was repelled, and Murong subsequently was defeated. Guo returned the Southern Tang general Yan Jingquan (燕敬權), and in return, Li returned Southern Tang's captives from the central Chinese regimes.

Meanwhile, it was said that Li Jing favored literary talent, and that at the time, Southern Tang had the most literary talents of the states of China. However, it did not hold imperial examinations. In 952, Li reinstitute the imperial examinations and put the official Jiang Wenwei (江文蔚) in charge of them. When Li asked how the examinations compared to those of Tang dynasty, which Southern Tang claimed to be the successor to, Jiang responded, "In the past dynasty, half of those who passed imperial examinations were properly passed based on their public performance, and half passed based on private favors. I, your subject, only base them on public performance." Li was pleased, but when the official Zhang Wei (張緯), who was a Tang examination, heard this, he became resentful of Jiang and began to speak against the imperial examinations. Further, the other high-level officials were also not imperial examinees, and therefore did not like the idea of them. Soon, the imperial examinations were abolished again.

Southern Tang's entrance of the Chu capital Tan Prefecture did not mean that Southern Tang possessed all of Chu lands—as while its forces controlled Wu'an, Wuping remained in Liu Yan's hands, and Chu's third main circuit, Jingjiang (靜江, headquartered in modern Guilin, Guangxi), fell into Southern Han's hands. Li contemplated campaigns to capture Wu'an and Jingjiang, but by summer 952 was contemplating giving up the campaign to capture Jingjiang and simply to issue a commission to Liu without taking actual control. When he consulted Sun Sheng and Feng Yanji, whom he had earlier made chancellors, Sun agreed, but Feng dissuaded him, suggesting that that would mean that the seizure of Chu was an empty one. However, an attack on Jingjiang's capital Gui Prefecture (桂州) was repelled by Southern Han at heavy losses to Southern Tang. Meanwhile, Bian, while known for kindness, was not governing Wu'an properly, as he was indecisive and allowed many of his subordinate to interfere with his decisions. In winter 952, Liu sent Wang Kui to launch a surprise attack on Tan. Bian, after trying to defend Tan briefly, abandoned it and fled back to Southern Tang proper. The other Southern Tang prefects assigned to former Chu prefectures, hearing of Tan's fall, also abandoned their prefectures, allowing Liu's army to recover nearly all of Chu's territory north of the Nanling Mountains (i.e., except Jingjiang). Southern Tang, in effect, gained nothing from the Chu adventure. Sun and Feng resigned their chancellorships, and Li stated that he would never launch another army. Still, in 955, when Later Shu's emperor Meng Chang sent emissaries to him and to Northern Han's emperor Liu Jun, with proposal to have a three-state alliance against Later Zhou, he agreed, although no real joint attack occurred.

=== Late reign ===
==== War with Later Zhou ====
Earlier in Southern Tang's history, it had been standard procedure for the Southern Tang army to carefully guard the southern bank of the Huai River when the water level were low. However, at some point in or before 955, Wu Tingshao (吳庭紹), the army monitor, thought it was unlikely that there would be war with Later Zhou, and proposed that this procedure be cancelled, to save costs. Wu's proposal was approved, despite vehement opposition by Liu Renzhan (劉仁瞻) the military governor of Qinghuai Circuit (清淮, headquartered in modern Lu'an, Anhui). Thus, when, in late 955, Later Zhou launched a major attack against Southern Tang, commanded by its chancellor Li Gu, assisted by the general Wang Yanchao (王彥超), Southern Tang was caught unprepared. Li Jing sent the general Liu Yanzhen (劉彥貞) to try to aid Liu Renzhan, whose capital Shou Prefecture (壽州) was the apparent initial target of the Later Zhou attack, and summoned Song Qiqiu, who was then the military governor of Zhennan, back to Jinling, to help him make military decisions.

Li Gu did, in fact, put Shou under siege, but could not capture it. When Liu Yanzhen's army arrived in Shou's vicinity, he decided to withdraw rather than confront Liu Yanzhen immediately. Liu Yanzhen's subordinate Xian Shilang (咸師朗) advocated chasing after Li Gu and attacking his army, and Liu Yanzhen decided to do so, despite Liu Renzhan's advice against it. When Liu Yanzhen reached Zhengyang (正陽, in modern Zhumadian, Henan), Li Gu counterattacked, defeating and killing him in battle while capturing Xian and many other of his officers. Over 10,000 Southern Tang soldiers were killed. Subsequently, the Later Zhou emperor Guo Rong (Guo Wei's adoptive son) arrived at Shou and again put it under siege, while replacing Li Gu as commander of the army with his cousin Li Chongjin. Li Jing subsequently wrote a letter to Guo, stating, "The Emperor of Tang respectfully addresses the Emperor of the Great Zhou. We request that you quiet your army and restore peace. We are willing to serve you as if you were an older brother, and willing to contribute goods toward your army costs." Guo did not respond. Worried about what might come next at his state's detriment, Li then sent his officials Zhong Mo (鍾謨) and Li Deming (李德明), both of whom known for their speaking skills, to submit tributes of imperial clothing, tea, traditional medicine, gold, silver, silk, cattle, and wine, at the Zhou army's then camp outside Shou. When Zhong and Li Deming arrived there, however, Guo rebuked them and refused their overture of peace, demanding that Li Jing himself come to beg forgiveness instead. Li Jing's emissary to Liao to ask Liao to attack Later Zhou from the north was intercepted by Later Zhou and never reached Liao. Meanwhile, concerned about the possibility that the Wu imperial Yang clan, whose members were then housed at Tai Prefecture (泰州, in modern Taizhou, Jiangsu), would be taken and used by the Later Zhou army, Li Jing sent the official Yin Yanfan (尹延範) to Tai to move them south of the Yangtze to Zhenhai's capital Run Prefecture (潤州). However, Yin, believing that the road is difficult and concerned that the Yangs would rebel, slaughtered them. Li Jing, shocked at this result, executed Yin.

In spring 956, after continuous Later Zhou victories, including capturing Jiangdu in a surprise attack, Li Jing made another peace overture, sending Sun Sheng and Wang Chongzhi (王崇質) to again pay tributes of gold, silver, and silk to Guo, and this time submitting a submissive petition (i.e., as a subject, rather than on equal terms):

Ever since Tianyou [(天佑, Tang's last era name)], the realm had been divided into parts; parts were occupied by warlords, and parts kept changing ruling families. I, your subject, inherited from my father, and I possessed the lands south of the Yangtze, but I was looking forward to being able to submit to a phoenix. Now, heaven has bestowed its mandate on you, and your fame and guidance reach through all the lands. I am willing to be like the Two Zhes [(i.e., Wuyue, whose lands were Tang's former Zhexi and Zhedong Circuits)] and Hunan [(i.e., the former Chu lands, then again under vassalage of Later Zhou)], to accept the rightful calendar and defend just my own territory. May you take back your military punishment and pardon my sins of late submission. Let us be the first of your subordinate states, and be a subject to you on the outside. Then, your grace will calm everyone from a far, and no one will dare to resist you.

Subsequently, through Li Deming and Sun, Li Jing further offered to give up his imperial title; give annual tributes of gold and silk; and cede six prefectures—Shou, Hao (濠州, in modern Chuzhou, Anhui), Si (泗州, in modern Shuzhou, Anhui), Chu (楚州, in modern Huai'an, Jiangsu), Guang (光州, in modern Xinyang, Henan), and Hai (海州, in modern Lianyungang, Jiangsu)—to Later Zhou. However, Guo, with his confidence bolstered by the Later Zhou victories, believed that he would be able to conquer all of Southern Tang's territories north of the Yangtze, refused. Li Deming and Sun convinced Guo to allow Li Deming and Wang to return to the Southern Tang court to relay the Later Zhou emperor's demands, and Guo himself issued letters addressed at Li Jing and the high-level Southern Tang officials, offering peace, but only at Later Zhou's stated terms. Li Jing again submitted a petition thanking Guo. When Li Deming arrived at Jinling, pointed out the Later Zhou military strength, and argued for ceding all of the territory north of the Yangtze for peace, however, Li Jing was displeased at his report, and Song argued that ceding land had no benefit to the state. Further, Chen Jue, who was then Li Jing's chief of staff, and Chen's deputy Li Zhenggu both had hated both Li Deming and Sun, and therefore enticed Wang into making different assessments than Li Deming about the Later Zhou strength. They then stated to Li Jing, "Li Deming has sold out the empire for his own benefit." In anger, Li Jing executed Li Deming—thus ending hopes of peace at that point.

While facing the Later Zhou invasion, Southern Tang was also facing the threat of Wuyue's invasion from the southeast. Li Jing, concerned that Wuyue would attack Run from Chang Prefecture (常州, in modern Changzhou, Jiangsu), decided to recall Li Hongji, who was then the commandant at Run, to Jinling, as he saw Li Hongji as too young to oversee the defense. Li Hongji, however, listened to his subordinate Zhao Duo (趙鐸) and decided that if he left Run, it would throw the city and the surrounding region into panic, and declined the recall and instead prepared to defend. He also gave full support to the general Chai Kehong (柴克宏) in Chai's efforts of resisting Wuyue forces. Chai subsequently crushed Wuyue forces under Wu Cheng, ending Wuyue's campaign against Southern Tang.

With the faltering of the peace efforts, Li Jing commissioned Li Jingda to head an army to counterattack and to try to lift the siege on Shou, but made Chen the army monitor, in actual control of the army. He also commissioned the official Zhu Yuan (朱元), whom he considered to be militarily talented, to lead an army in trying to recover the prefectures that Later Zhou had captured. Zhu was able to quickly recapture Shu (舒州, in modern Anqing, Anhui) and He (和州, in modern Ma'anshan, Anhui) Prefectures, while Li Ping (李平) recaptured Qi Prefecture (蘄州, in modern Huanggang, Hubei). With these losses and with Li Jingda's army approaching Shou, Guo decided to withdraw from Jiangdu, concentrating his forces on capturing Shou. Li Jingda's army set up camp near Shou, but did not dare to engage the Later Zhou siege army.

In winter 956, Li Jing, hearing of discord between the Later Zhou generals Zhang Yongde (張永德, Guo Rong's brother-in-law) and Li Chongjin, Li Jing wrote a secret letter to Li Chongjin, apparently trying to entice him to turn against Guo, in which he made many disparaging remarks about Guo. Li Chongjin, however, presented the letter to Guo, who had at that point returned to the Later Zhou capital Daliang. Upon seeing the letter, Guo, incensed, summoned Sun (whom he had taken back to Daliang with him, along with Zhong), and confronted him about how, unlike what he had previously stated about Li Jing (that Li Jing wanted to become a vassal), Li Jing was trying to entice Li Chongjin to rebel. He also ordered Sun to tell him Southern Tang state secrets. Sun refused and asked for death. Guo thereafter executed Sun and exiled Zhong, but soon thereafter regretted executing the faithful Sun, and therefore recalled Zhong back to his court. Meanwhile, Li Jing sent another emissary, Chen Chuyao (陳處堯), over the seas to go to the Liao court to request aid from Emperor Muzong of Liao. Liao did not launch an army to aid Southern Tang, and detained Chen at the Liao court.

Because of Zhu's battlefield achievements, he became arrogant and often resisted orders issued by Li Jingda (but actually by Chen). In spring 957, Chen submitted a petition to Li Jing, arguing that Zhu could not be trusted, and Li Jing sent the general Yang Shouzhong (楊守忠) to replace Zhu. Zhu, in anger and fear, initially considered committing suicide, but instead decided to surrender to Later Zhou, with more than 10,000 soldiers. The Later Zhou forces sieging Shou took this opportunity to attack and crush Li Jingda's army. Yang, Xu Wenzhen (許文稹), and Bian Hao were captured. Li Jingda and Chen fled back to Jinling. With Liu Renzhan deathly ill, the Shou garrison surrendered. When Liu died shortly after, Li Jing, in remembrance of his faithfulness in defending the city for so long, bestowed posthumous honors on him. After capturing Shou, Guo Rong, now again personally commanding the Later Zhou army, approached Jiangdu. Southern Tang forces burned the city and abandoned it, as Later Zhou forces continue to capture city after city north of the Yangtze. As of spring 958, Guo's army had arrived at the Yangtze and was inflicting losses on the Southern Tang fleet, posturing to cross the Yangtze. At this point, Southern Tang only retained four prefectures north of the Yangtze—Lu (廬州, in modern Hefei, Anhui), Shu, Qi, and Huang (黃州, in modern Huanggang).

At this time, Li Jingsui, who had continuously offered to yield the crown prince title, again did so and argued that Li Hongji, due to his contributions during the campaign against Wuyue, should become crown prince. Li Jingda also offered to yield the title of generalissimo of all circuits. Li Jing agreed, creating Li Jingsui the Prince of Jin and making him the commandant at Hong Prefecture (洪州, in modern Nanchang, Jiangxi) as well as the generalissimo of Jiangnan West Circuit (i.e., Zhennan), and making Li Jingda the commandant at Fu Prefecture (撫州, in modern Fuzhou, Jiangxi). He created Li Hongji crown prince.

With the Later Zhou forces at the Yangtze, Li Jing finally decided to capitulate, but felt ashamed of personally becoming a vassal to Guo, and therefore sent Chen as an emissary to Guo, offering to pass the throne to Li Hongji and have Li Hongji submit as a vassal. Chen, upon arriving at Guo's camp, saw the impressiveness of the Later Zhou army, and therefore spoke humbly to Guo, requesting that he be allowed to send his subordinate Liu Chengyu (劉承遇) back to Jinling to obtain a petition from Li Jing, offering to cede Lu, Shu, Qi, and Huang to Later Zhou, so that the Yangtze would form the new border. Guo agreed, and authored a letter in which he addressed Li Jing, "The respectful greeting of the Emperor to the Lord of Jiangnan." When Liu arrived at Jinling to report, Li Jing agreed, and, in a petition in which he referred to himself as "The Lord of Tang", offered submit the four prefectures and annual tributes. Guo agreed to the terms, and ordered cessation of hostilities. He also had Chen inform Li Jing that it was unnecessary to pass the throne to Li Hongji. Pursuant to his submission to Later Zhou, Li Jing stopped using his own era names and adopted Later Zhou's, to show submission. He stopped referring to himself as "emperor" but only as "lord", and stopped using imperial ceremonies. He also changed his own name from the character 璟 to 景, to observe naming taboo, as Guo Wei's great-great-grandfather was named Guo Jing with the character of 璟.

==== After losses to Later Zhou ====
In summer 958, Li Hongji, fearful that Li Jing would restore Li Jingsui to crown prince status, poisoned Li Jingsui to death. Subsequently, Li Jing again proposed to Guo that he pass the throne to Li Hongji, and Guo again declined to approve. Guo did return Feng Yanlu (who had previously been captured), Zhong Mo, Xu Wenzhen, Bian Hao, and Zhou Tinggou (周廷構) to Southern Tang. Li Jing, viewing Xu and Bian to be defeated generals, never commissioned them again with army commands.

At this point, Li Jing was depressed over the military disasters. Li Zhenggu suggested that he go into seclusion and entrust the state to Song Qiqiu to govern. Zhong, who was friendly with Li Deming and who wanted to avenge Li Deming, used this opportunity to accuse Song, Li Zhenggu, and Chen Jue of collaborating to have Song usurp the throne. Further, at this time, Chen had also forged an order from Guo that the Southern Tang chancellor Yan Xu be put to death. These events convinced Li Jing that the Song faction was up to no good. In winter 958, Li Jing thus acted, exiling Chen, executing Li Zhenggu, and ordering Song back into retirement, albeit with his titles still intact. After Song reached his retirement place at Mount Jiuhua in spring 959, Li Jing had his mansion securely guarded, only allowing food to be passed through a hole in the wall. Song lamented and believed that this was divine retribution for his suggestion to have Yang Pu's family put under secure guard, and thereafter hanged himself. Subsequently, at Guo's encouragement, Li Jing began to rebuild some of his defenses. (Li Jing had previously feared that that would be viewed by Guo as provocation, but Guo, who was ill at that point, pointed out that what might lie in the future was uncertain, and that Li Jing had to watch out for his own state's own good. Guo would, in fact, die in summer 959, and be succeeded by his six-year-old son Guo Chongxun.) Meanwhile, with Jinling just across the Yangtze from Later Zhou territory, Li Jing began to consider moving the capital to Hong Prefecture, and put the deputy chief of staff Tang Hao (唐鎬), who was the only high-level official in favor of the idea, in charge of building up Hong to serve as the capital.

By this point, the Southern Tang economy had been greatly damaged by the wars with Later Zhou and the subsequent crippling annual tributes agreed to, particularly given that the supply of coins remaining from Tang times was dwindling and the inflation of prices of goods that the state was confronted with. At Zhong's suggestion, Li Jing ordered that large coins be minted and be deemed the worth of 50 Tang coins.

In fall 959, Li Hongji died. Zhong, who had long been honored by both Li Jing and Guo Rong and therefore had been highly influential at the Southern Tang court, but whose arrogance was beginning to cause Li Jing to be displeased, spoke against having Li Jing's next oldest son Li Congjia the Prince of Zheng succeed Li Hongji as crown prince, instead recommending a younger son, Li Congshan (李從善) the Duke of Ji, arguing that Li Congjia was timid and overly devout in Buddhism, while Li Congshan was resolute. This greatly displeased Li Jing, who viewed him as overreaching. Soon, he exiled, and then executed Zhong and his ally Zhang Luan (張巒), and cancelled the large coins that Zhong had advocated. He created Li Congjia the Prince of Wu and had him move into the Eastern Palace.

In 960, the major Later Zhou general Zhao Kuangyin carried out a coup, overthrowing Guo Chongxun and claiming the throne himself as the emperor of a new state of Song (as its Emperor Taizu). When he subsequently sent an edict to Li Jing, Li Jing accepted it (thus accepting Song overlordship), and in fact then sent an emissary to congratulate the Song emperor's ascension. When, in fall 960, Li Chongjin rose against the Song emperor at Yang Prefecture (揚州, i.e., Jiangdu), where he was serving as the military governor of Huainan Circuit (淮南), he sought an alliance with Southern Tang, but Li Jing rejected his overtures. The Song emperor shortly after defeated him, and he committed suicide. When the Song emperor subsequently reviewed the Song fleet on the Yangtze, Li Jing became very fearful, but was calmed somewhat when two minor Southern Tang officials, Du Zhuo (杜著) and Xue Liang (薛良) tried to defect to Song, but the Song emperor, despising their treachery, executed Du and exiled Xue. Still, he became more resolute on moving the capital.

In spring 961, Li Jing ordered that the capital be moved to Hong, now upgraded to Nanchang Municipality. He created Li Congjia crown prince, to remain at Jinling and oversee the affairs of state during the capital move. When he reached Nanchang, however, he discovered that the city was too small to house his government, such that there was only office space for about 10–20% of his officials, and that it was not easily expandable. The officials longed for Jinling, and Li Jing himself often looked north (toward Jinling) in sadness, such that his imperial scholar Qin Chengyu (秦承裕), in order to alleviate his sadness, often blocked his view with a screen. He considered executing those who advocated the move, such that Tang Hao died in anxiety.

Li Jing himself died in summer 961. He left directions that he be buried in the mountains west of Nanchang. However, instead, his casket was returned to Jinling, where Li Congjia took the throne (and thereafter kept the capital at). Subsequently, at Li Congjia's request, Li Jing was allowed to be against posthumously referred to as "emperor" and have his tomb considered an imperial tomb. The Xu Zizhi Tongjian commented about Li Jing:

The Lord of Southern Tang was talented and studious. During his reign, he was kind and frugal, and he had the disposition suitable for a ruler. However, as he regarded himself to be a descendant of the Tang imperial clan, he fell under the seduction of suggestions to enlarge his realm. After he suffered losses at Fu Prefecture and Hunan, he finally began to know the difficulties of capturing territory. He thus once stated, "I do not want to use the army again in my lifetime." When the Zhou army invaded, he entrusted his own army to the wrong people and thus could not resist the army from the north. He was forced to humiliate his state and reduce his own titles, and die in fear and regret.

== Sources ==
- Kurz, Johannes L. (2011). China's Southern Tang Dynasty (937-976). Routledge. ISBN -9780415454964.
- Mote, F.W. (1999). Imperial China (900-1800). Harvard University Press. pp. 11, 13–14. ISBN 978-0-674-01212-7.
- Old History of the Five Dynasties, vol. 134.
- New History of the Five Dynasties, vol. 62.
- History of Song, vol. 478.
- Spring and Autumn Annals of the Ten Kingdoms, vol. 16.
- Zizhi Tongjian, vols. 272, 277, 279, 280, 281, 282, 283, 284, 285, 286, 287, 288, 289, 290, 291, 292, 293, 294.
- Xu Zizhi Tongjian, vols. 1, 2.

Regnal titles
Preceded by Wang Yanzheng of Min	Ruler of China (Southern Fujian) (de facto); 945–947	Succeeded by Liu Congxiao
Preceded by Wang Yanzheng of Min	Emperor of China (Southern Fujian) (de jure); 945–961	Succeeded by Li Yu
Preceded by Wang Yanzheng of Min	Emperor of China (Northwestern Fujian); 945–961	Succeeded by Li Yu
Preceded by Li Bian (Emperor Liezu)	Emperor of Southern Tang; 943–961	Succeeded by Li Yu
Preceded by Li Bian (Emperor Liezu)	Emperor of China (Jiangxi/Southern Jiangsu/Southern Anhui); 943–961	Succeeded by Li Yu
Preceded by Li Bian (Emperor Liezu)	Emperor of China (Central Jiangsu/Central Anhui/Eastern Hubei); 943–958	Succeeded by Guo Rong of Later Zhou
Preceded by Zhuo Yanming	Emperor of China (Northeastern Fujian) (de jure); 945–946; With: Shi Chonggui of Later Jin	Succeeded by Shi Chonggui of Later Jin / Qian Hongzuo of Wuyue
Preceded by Liu Chengyou of Later Han	Emperor of China (Northwestern Hunan) (de jure); 950–951	Succeeded by Guo Wei of Later Zhou
Preceded by Liu Chengyou of Later Han	Emperor of China (Southeastern Hunan) (de jure); 951–952	Succeeded by Guo Wei of Later Zhou
Preceded by Liu Chengyou of Later Han	Emperor of China (Northeastern Guangxi) (de jure); 951	Succeeded by Liu Sheng of Southern Han
Preceded by Ma Xichong of Chu	Ruler of China (Southeastern Hunan) (de facto); 951–952	Succeeded by Liu Yan
