= Ma Xichong =

Ruler of Ma Chu in 951

Ma Xichong 馬希崇
- Acting Jiedushi of Wu'an Circuit

Ruler of Ma Chu
- Reign: October 22, 951-November 16, 951
- Predecessor: Ma Xi'e
- Successor: None

Acting Jiedushi of Wu'an Circuit (權知武安節度兵馬留後事)
- Tenure: October 22, 951 – November 16, 951
- Predecessor: Ma Xi'e (as jiedushi)
- Successor: Bian Hao (as jiedushi)
- Born: 912? Likely Changsha
- Died: Unknown (in or after 956)
Names
- Mǎ Xīchóng (馬希崇)
- House: Ma
- Dynasty: Ma Chu
- Father: Ma Yin
- Mother: Unknown

Ma Xichong (traditional Chinese: 馬希崇; simplified Chinese: 马希崇; pinyin: Mǎ Xīchóng) was the sixth and final monarch of China's Ma Chu dynasty during the Five Dynasties and Ten Kingdoms period.

== Background ==
According to the Spring and Autumn Annals of the Ten Kingdoms, citing another work now lost, the Miscellaneous Records from a Blue Box (青箱雜記, Qingxiang Zaji), Ma Xichong was born in 912. His father was Chu's founder Ma Yin. His mother was not Ma Yin's wife, but was otherwise not named in historical sources, although it is known that Ma Yin's 30th son Ma Xi'e, who was older than he was, was born of the same mother. Ma Yin's 35th son Ma Xiguang, who was born of Lady Chen, was also older.

In 947, then-Chu prince Ma Xifan (Ma Yin's fourth son), who was also born of Lady Chen, died. Ma Xi'e was then the oldest surviving son of Ma Yin's, and arguably should be Ma Xifan's successor under Ma Yin's instructions that his succeed each other based on age. However, most of Ma Xifan's staff members supported Ma Xiguang, who subsequently accepted the title of Prince of Chu. Either prior to Ma Xiguang's ascension or after, Ma Xichong received the title of Tiance Zuo Sima (天策左司馬), as an officer under Ma Xiguang, who also carried the title of Tiance Grand General (天策大將軍). His disposition was described to be treacherous.

== During Ma Xiguang's reign ==
Upon Ma Xiguang's assumption of the throne, Ma Xichong secretly wrote letters to Ma Xi'e, who was then the military governor (Jiedushi) of Wuping Circuit (武平, headquartered in modern Changde, Hunan), trying to incite Ma Xi'e about Ma Xiguang's succession by citing Ma Yin's instructions. He also thereafter often reported to Ma Xi'e on Ma Xiguang's actions and offered to support Ma Xi'e if Ma Xi'e would attack Chu's capital Changsha.

As of late 950, when Ma Xi'e was in fact leading an army to try to capture Changsha, reports were made to Ma Xiguang that Ma Xichong was planning to rebel against him, and suggestions were made to Ma Xiguang that he should kill Ma Xichong. Ma Xiguang declined, however, stating, "If I myself kill my younger brother, how will I see the deceased king [(i.e., Ma Yin)] in the underworld?" He subsequently made Ma Xichong the army monitor of the general Xu Keqiong, who commanded the main Chu troops defending against Ma Xi'e. Xu subsequently turned against Ma Xiguang and surrendered to Ma Xi'e (although it is not clear whether Ma Xichong had any involvement in this), causing Changsha to fall around the new year 951. Ma Xichong thereafter led the staff at headquarters to welcome Ma Xi'e and offer the throne to him. Ma Xi'e subsequently assumed the throne and put Ma Xiguang to death.

== During Ma Xi'e's reign ==
As the Prince of Chu, Ma Xi'e made Ma Xichong his deputy in his role as military governor of, in addition to Wuping, Chu's main circuit Wu'an (武安, headquartered at Changsha), and made him in charge of the headquarters. Ma Xi'e spent day and night feasting, entrusting the matters of the headquarters to Ma Xichong. Ma Xichong governed based on his own likes and dislikes, causing the legal system to break down. Ma Xi'e also favored the guard officer Xie Yanyong (謝彥顒) — a former house servant of his, whose relationship with him appeared to be sexual as Xie was described to have a beautiful face and was frequently seated with Ma Xi'e's concubines — such that, at feasts, Xie had a more honored seat than the generals, was involved in decision-making, and was even daring enough to pat Ma Xichong on the back, leading to Ma Xichong's and the generals' resentment.

Meanwhile, the generals Wang Kui and Zhou Xingfeng took their troops from Changsha and seized control of Wuping's capital Lang Prefecture (朗州), deposing Ma Xi'e's son Ma Guangzan (馬光贊) and installing as military governor, successively, a son of Ma Xie's (and Ma Xichong's) oldest brother Ma Xizhen (馬希振), Ma Guanghui, and then the general Liu Yan. Ma Xi'e considered what to do with the Lang situation. He stationed the officers Xu Wei (徐威), Chen Jingqian (陳敬遷), Lu Gongguan (魯公館), and Lu Mengjun (陸孟俊) northwest of the city to defend against a possible attack from Wuping. These officers and their soldiers, however, resented him for not trying to comfort them. At night on October 22, 951, the officers mutinied, with Ma Xichong's foreknowledge. Ma Xi'e tried to flee, but was captured. Xie was executed by being cut into pieces. The officers declared Ma Xichong to be the acting military governor of Wuping, and delivered Ma Xi'e to Hengshan (衡山, in modern Hengyang, Hunan) to be put under arrest there. As Ma Xichong was aware that Ma Xi'e had whipped Peng Shigao, he had Peng escort Ma Xi'e to Hengshan, and was expecting that Peng would kill him. However, Peng saw through Ma Xichong's plan, and commented, "You want me to be someone who murders his lord!" He thereafter treated Ma Xi'e with respect and escorted him safely to Hengshan. In the aftermaths of the coup, Lu slaughtered the family of the official Yang Zhaoyun (楊昭惲) and seized the Yang family's wealth; one of the Yang family's daughters was beautiful, and Lu presented her to Ma Xichong to become his concubine.

== Brief hold on power ==
Upon hearing how Ma Xichong had seized power at Changsha, Liu Yan launched his troops and claimed that he would punish Ma Xichong for his usurpation. In fear, Ma Xichong sent emissaries to Liu, offering peace as coequal circuits — i.e., not asserting authority over Wuping. Liu's secretary Li Guanxiang (李觀象) suggested to Liu that he first demand the deaths of certain Ma Xi'e staff members, to weaken Ma Xichong's troops' morale, and then use that as the opportunity to seize Wu'an. Liu agreed, and sent such a demand to Ma Xichong. Ma Xichong, fearing Liu, followed Liu's demand and executed Ma Xi'e's military assistant Yang Zhongmin (楊仲敏), secretary Liu Guangfu (劉光輔), guard commander Wei Shijin (魏師進), and guard officer Wang Qin (王勍), among others, sending the official Li Yi (李翊) to deliver the heads to Lang. However, by the time that Li arrived at Lang, the heads had already decomposed. Liu Yan and Wang Kui insisted that these were not the heads Liu Yan demanded, and Li Yi, in fear, committed suicide.

When Ma Xi'e arrived at Hengshan, the commander of the Hengshan garrison, Liao Yan (廖偃), stated to his uncle Liao Kuangning (廖匡凝), "Our family had, for generations, received the grace of the Ma family. Now Ma Xi'e, who is the oldest, has been deposed, and will surely suffer disaster. We should support him." He mobilized the people who lived in the territory into an army corps, and, along with Peng Shigao, declared Ma Xi'e the Prince of Hengshan. They built defensive fences on the Xiang river and began to build warships out of bamboo. They soon gathered over 10,000 men and received support from nearby prefectures. Liao Yan also sent his assistant Liu Xuji (劉虛己) to seek aid from Southern Tang.

Meanwhile, upon his assumption of power, Ma Xichong also spent time feasting; he governed unfairly, and spoke arrogantly, leading the people not to support him. Xu Wei came to see Ma Xichong as someone who would amount to nothing, and feared attacks from Ma Xi'e and Liu Yan, and therefore considered killing Ma Xichong. Ma Xichong realized that something was wrong, and, in fear, sent his general Fan Shoumu (范守牧) to Southern Tang, whose emperor Li Jing was Ma Xi'e's nominal sovereign, to request aid. Li Jing thereafter sent the Southern Tang general Bian Hao to take 10,000 men to head from Yuan Prefecture (袁州, in modern Yichun, Jiangxi) toward Changsha.

As Bian approached Changsha, Ma Xichong first sent emissaries to welcome his army, and then sent the senior official Tuoba Heng (拓拔恆) to bear his letter of surrender to Bian, causing Tuoba to lament, "I lived too long without dying, such that I am bearing the surrender instrument for a child!" On November 16, 951, Ma Xichong led a group of his younger brothers and nephews to welcome Bian outside the city, and they bowed as they saw the dust stirred up by the approaching army. Bian, in Li Jing's name, comforted them. The next day, Bian led them back into the city and ascended the tower at Liuyang Gate (瀏陽門) to pronounce Southern Tang forces' arrival, signaling the end of the Ma family's rule.

== After Chu's fall ==
In the aftermaths of Ma Xichong's surrender, Ma Xi'e hoped that Li would restore him to power at Changsha. However, the people of Changsha were resentful of Ma Xi'e's rule, and therefore submitted a petition that Bian be put in command. Li therefore commissioned Bian as the military governor (Jiedushi) of Wu'an Circuit (武安, headquartered at Changsha). He subsequently ordered Ma Xichong and his clan to move to Jinling. They tried to bribe him to be able to stay at Changsha, but he, with a sarcastic smile, stated to Ma Xichong:

The Empire and Your Lordship's state had been enemies for over 60 years. But the Empire did not dare to even think of coveting Your Lordship's state. Now, Your Lordship and your brothers had fought this internecine war, and you decided to submit because you are in extreme distress. If you are allowed to recover even two or three tenths of your strength, what might happen cannot be predicted.

Ma Xichong had no convincing response to him. Shortly after, they were placed on ships and sent to Jinling, with both they and their senders-off crying bitterly and loudly. Bian subsequently also sent the officer Li Chengjian (李承戩) to Mount Heng to order Ma Xi'e to report to Jinling as well. Ma Xi'e, apparently intimidated, took his army and, after first visiting Changsha, reported to Jinling as well. Li Jing continued to have Ma Xi'e carry the title of Prince of Chu, while making Ma Xichong the military governor of Yongtai Circuit (永泰, headquartered in modern Anqing, Anhui) and defender of Yongtai's capital Shu Prefecture (舒州); he also bestowed on Ma Xichong the honorary chancellor title of Shizhong (侍中).

Sometime later, Ma Xichong and his family were settled at Yang Prefecture (揚州, in modern Yangzhou, Jiangsu). In 956, Southern Tang came under attack by its northern neighbor Later Zhou, and Yang Prefecture fell to the invading Later Zhou forces. Later Zhou's emperor Guo Rong ordered that Ma Xichong (along with Wang Jiyi (王繼沂), the son of Min's last emperor Wang Yanzheng, who was also settled by Southern Tang at Yang) be located and comforted. Apparently in gratitude, Ma Xichong presented his concubine Lady Yang to the Later Zhou general Han Lingkun (韓令坤). Subsequently, when Later Zhou forces were forced to abandon Yang, Ma Xichong took 17 brothers and/or cousins to the Later Zhou capital Daliang, and he was made a general of the imperial guards. That was the last historical reference to Ma Xichong, and it was not known when he died.

== Notes and references ==
- Old History of the Five Dynasties, vol. 133.
- New History of the Five Dynasties, vol. 66.
- Spring and Autumn Annals of the Ten Kingdoms, vol. 69.
- Zizhi Tongjian, vols. 287, 289, 290, 293.

Chinese nobility
| Preceded by Ma Xi'e | Ruler of Chu; 951 | Succeeded by None |
| Preceded by Ma Xi'e | Ruler of China (Southeastern Hunan) (de facto); 951 | Succeeded by Li Jing of Southern Tang |
| Preceded by Ma Xi'e | Ruler of China (Northeastern Guangxi) (de facto); 951 | Succeeded by Ma Xiyin |
