= Ma Guanghui =

Chinese statesman

Ma Guanghui (馬光惠) was a member of the Ma ruling house of Chu, one of the Five Dynasties and Ten Kingdoms Period states of China. During Chu's final days, he was declared the military governor (Jiedushi) of one of Chu's main circuits, Wuping (武平, headquartered in modern Changde, Hunan) by officers disaffected with his uncle Ma Xi'e, but was soon removed by the same officers.

== Background ==
Ma Guanghui was a son of Ma Xizhen (馬希振), the oldest son of Ma Yin (King Wumu), the founder of Chu. Not only was Ma Xizhen the oldest, but he was born of Ma Yin's wife, which should have made him the heir under Confucian succession principles, but Ma Yin favored his second son Ma Xisheng, who was born of his favorite concubine Consort Yuan. Not willing to engage in a succession struggle with Ma Xisheng, Ma Xizhen resigned and became a Taoist priest, dying during the Qingtai era (934-936). Nothing is known about Ma Guanghui's mother or whether he had siblings.

== Brief tenure as military governor ==
In 951, during the reign of Ma Guanghui's uncle (Ma Yin's 30th son) Ma Xi'e (Prince Gongxiao), the officers Wang Kui and Zhou Xingfeng became disaffected with Ma Xi'e, and they took their troops and fled the capital Changsha, back to their prefecture of origin, Lang Prefecture (朗州, in modern Changde, Hunan). They took over control of Lang and deposed Ma Xi'e's son Ma Guangzan (馬光贊), who was serving as the acting military governor of Wuping Circuit, headquartered at Lang. They declared Ma Guanghui as the acting prefect, and then as military governor of Wuping, but effectively, Wang and Zhou, along with officers He Jingzhen (何敬真) and Zhang Fang (張倣), controlled the headquarters. When Ma Xi'e reported this to his nominal sovereign Li Jing, the emperor of Southern Tang, Li Jing sent emissaries to Lang with material rewards, hoping to get these officers to submit. However, they kept the rewards, returned the emissaries, and did not respond to Li Jing's edict, and Li Jing did not dare to react at that point.

However, Ma Guanghui was said to be unintelligent, cowardly, and alcoholic, and he could not get the officers to respect him. As a result of this, Wang, Zhou, and He Jingzhen decided to replace him with Liu Yan the prefect of Chen Prefecture (辰州, in modern Huaihua, Hunan). After they summoned Liu from Chen, they deposed Ma Guanghui and delivered him to Southern Tang. That was the last reference in history to Ma Guanghui, and it is not known when he died.

== Notes and references ==
- Spring and Autumn Annals of the Ten Kingdoms, vol. 71.
- Zizhi Tongjian, vol. 290.

Chinese nobility
Preceded by Ma Xi'e	Ruler of China (Northwestern Hunan) (de facto); 951	Succeeded by Liu Yan
