= Ma Xi'e =

Prince of Chu in 951

Prince Gongxiao of Chu 楚恭孝王
- Prince of Chu

Prince of Chu
- Tenure: January 24, 951 – October 22, 951
- Predecessor: Ma Xiguang
- Successor: Ma Xichong

Jiedushi of Wu'an Circuit (武安軍節度使)
- Tenure: January 24, 951 – October 22, 951
- Predecessor: Ma Xiguang
- Successor: Ma Xichong
- Deputy: Ma Xichong

Jiedushi of Wuping Circuit (武平軍節度使)
- Tenure: 947 – 951
- Predecessor: Ma Xigao
- Successor: Ma Guanghui
- Born: Unknown; Likely Changsha
- Died: 950s Jinling
- Wife: Lady Yuan (d. 949)
- Issue: Ma Guangzan (馬光贊), son
Names
- Mǎ Xī'è (馬希萼)
Era name and dates
- Bǎodà (保大) (Adopted the era names of Southern Tang): 950–951
Posthumous name
- Prince Gōngxiào (恭孝王, "respectful and filial")
- House: Ma
- Dynasty: Ma Chu
- Father: Ma Yin
- Mother: Unknown

Ma Xi'e (traditional Chinese: 馬希萼; simplified Chinese: 马希萼; pinyin: Mǎ Xī'è), also known by his posthumous name as the Prince Gongxiao of Chu (楚恭孝王), was the fifth ruler of the Ma Chu dynasty of China during the Five Dynasties and Ten Kingdoms period.

== Background ==
It is not known when Ma Xi'e was born. He was Chu's founder Ma Yin (King Wumu)'s 30th son. His mother was not Ma Yin's wife, but was otherwise not named in historical sources, although it is known that a younger brother, Ma Xichong, was born of the same mother.

As of 947, Ma Xi'e was serving under an older half-brother (Ma Yin's fourth son), Ma Xifan, who was then the Prince of Chu, as the military governor of Wuping Circuit (武平, headquartered in modern Changde, Hunan) and the acting prefect of Yong Prefecture (永州, in modern Yongzhou, Hunan). When Ma Xifan died suddenly in 947 without designating an heir, his staff members discussed who should be invited to succeed him. The officers Zhang Shaodi (張少敵) and Yuan Yougong (袁友恭) argued that Ma Xi'e, who was the oldest surviving son of Ma Yin's, should be invited to succeed, given that Ma Yin had left instructions for his sons to succeed each other based on age. The officers Liu Yantao (劉彥瑫) and Yang Di (楊滌) and the officials Li Honggao (李弘皋) and Deng Yiwen (鄧懿文) wanted to support Ma Xifan's full younger brother Ma Xiguang, who was Ma Yin's 35th son and whom Ma Xifan had put in charge of the headquarters as the commander of the armed forces of Chu's main circuit, Wu'an (武安, headquartered in modern Changsha, Hunan). Zhang stated, "Yong Prefecture is older and is strong-willed, and will surely not willingly serve under the Commander. If we are to support the Commander, we must think of a careful strategy to control Yong Prefecture such that he will not move against the Commander. Otherwise, the state will be endangered." The senior official Tuoba Heng (拓跋恆) also stated, "Even though Master 35 governs the matters of the headquarters, Master 30 is older. Master 35 should send an emissary to offer to yield. Otherwise, a dispute will surely result." However, Liu and his partisans stated, "Today, the governance is in your hands. If you refuse what Heaven gives to you and let someone else take it, where will we be in the future?" Ma Xiguang, who was weak-willed and not sure what to do, allowed Liu and the others to announce that it was Ma Xifan's will that he succeed to the throne. Zhang, knowing that disaster was coming, claimed illness and withdrew from headquarters, as did Tuoba.

Meanwhile, Ma Xichong had been writing secret letters to Ma Xi'e, inciting him by arguing that Liu and the others had gone against Ma Yin's instructions. When Ma Xi'e was approaching Changsha from Yong in order to mourn Ma Xifan, Ma Xiguang, at Liu's suggestion, sent the guard commander Zhou Tinghui (周廷誨) with a fleet to intercept him at Dieshi (跌石), where he ordered the Yong soldiers to be disarmed before they would be allowed to approach Changsha further. He housed Ma Xi'e at Bixiang Palace (碧湘宮) and had Ma Xi'e mourn there, not allowing him to go to Ma Xiguang's palace to meet with Ma Xiguang. After mourning, Ma Xi'e requested permission to return to Wuping's capital Lang Prefecture (朗州). Zhou suggested to Ma Xiguang that he kill Ma Xi'e, but Ma Xiguang responded, "How would I have the heart to kill my older brother? I would rather divide Tan (潭州, i.e., Changsha) and Lang and govern them separately." He gave Ma Xi'e many gifts and allowed him to return to Lang. However, Ma Xichong continued to spy on Ma Xiguang and enticed Ma Xi'e to rebel, offering to assist him if he did.

Ma Xi'e subsequently submitted a petition to then-Later Han emperor Liu Chengyou, to whom the Chu state was a vassal, that he be allowed to separately submit tributes to the emperor and requested a commission separate from Ma Xiguang (in essence, asking that the Chu state be divided formally). Ma Xiguang, under advice by his guard officer Ou Honglian (歐弘練) and liaison to the Later Han court Zhang Zhongxun (張仲荀), sent many gifts to the high-level officials that Liu Zhiyuan left in charge of Liu Chengyou's administration, asking them to reject Ma Xi'e's proposal. As a result, Liu Chengyou issued an edict to both Ma Xi'e and Ma Xiguang, stating, "Brothers should have harmony. Whatever Ma Xi'e wants to submit should be submitted under Ma Xiguang's." Ma Xi'e was displeased.

== Contention with Ma Xiguang ==
In fall 949, Ma Xi'e openly rose against Ma Xiguang. He mobilized the men of Lang and built 700 ships, intending to attack Tan, despite his wife Lady Yuan's urging against such action. When Ma Xiguang heard of this, he initially wanted to capitulate, stating, "Lang Prefecture is my older brother. I should not fight with him, and I shall yield the kingdom to him." Liu Yantao and Li Honggao urged him against doing so. He thereafter sent Wang Yun (王贇) the prefect of Yue Prefecture (岳州, in modern Yueyang, Hunan) to command an army against Ma Xi'e, with Liu serving as Wang's army monitor. Wang was able to defeat Ma Xi'e and capture 300 of Ma Xi'e's ships. Wang chased Ma Xi'e and came close to capturing him, but Ma Xiguang recalled his army, stating to him, "Do not harm my brother." When Ma Xi'e fled back to Lang, Lady Yuan, stating, "Disaster is coming, and I do not wish to see it," committed suicide by jumping into a well, but that did not stop Ma Xi'e's subsequent machinations. Meanwhile, Ma Xiguang's younger brother Ma Xizhan (馬希瞻) the military governor of Jingjiang Circuit (靜江, headquartered in modern Guilin), had been sending emissaries to both Ma Xi'e and Ma Xiguang, hoping to stop their wars, but neither listened to him. In fear that this would lead to the Ma clan's destruction, Ma Xizhan developed ulcers on his back and died.

Ma Xi'e, after his initial defeat, decided to write the leaders of the non-Han tribes of Chen (辰州) and Xu (漵州) (both in modern Huaihua, Hunan), as well as the Meishan Tribes (梅山蠻, centered on the region of modern Yiyang, Hunan), inviting them to attack Tan with him. The tribal leaders had long heard of Changsha's wealth, and were enticed, and so they jointly attacked Yiyang (益陽, in modern Yiyang) with him. When Ma Xiguang sent the officer Chen Fan (陳璠) to resist them, Chen was defeated and killed. Subsequently, the officers Zhang Yansi (張延嗣) and Huang Chuchao (黃處超) were also killed by the joint army. This caused great shock among the people at Tan, and Ma Xiguang then sent the officer Cui Honglian (崔洪璉) to take up defense position at Yutan (玉潭, in modern Changsha), preparing for Ma Xi'e's assault.

Meanwhile, Ma Xi'e had not given up on persuading the Later Han government to side with him, and he sent an emissary to the Later Han court, asking to be allowed to establish an independent liaison office at Daliang. Liu Chengyou denied the request on the basis that the Chu state already had a liaison office. Ma Xi'e, believing that Later Han's government intended to protect Ma Xiguang, decided to submit as a vassal to Southern Tang instead and requested Southern Tang aid against Ma Xiguang. Southern Tang's emperor Li Jing accepted his submission, bestowed an honorary chancellorship on him, and rewarded him with one year of tax revenues from E Prefecture (鄂州, in modern Wuhan, Hubei). Southern Tang also sent the general He Jingzhu (何敬洙) with an army to aid Ma Xi'e. Ma Xiguang submitted a petition to the Later Han court, asking for aid, specifically asking for Later Han to launch an army to be stationed at Li Prefecture (澧州, in modern Changde) to cut off potential aid by Southern Tang or Jingnan to Ma Xi'e.

In winter 950, Liu proposed that Ma Xiguang allow him to command an army to directly attack Lang, claiming that he could defeat and capture Ma Xi'e. Ma Xiguang agreed. When Liu led the army to Lang, he initially encountered no resistance, but soon fell into a trap set by Ma Xi'e's and the non-Han tribes' troops, such that his army was crushed. Ma Xiguang, in fear, opened up his treasury and rewarded much of the wealth to his soldiers, to try to keep his faith. Meanwhile, when reports were made to him that Ma Xichong was in communications with Ma Xi'e, suggestions were made to him that Ma Xichong be executed, but Ma Xiguang refused, stating, "If I myself kill my younger brother, how will I see the deceased king [(i.e., Ma Yin)] in the underworld?" Shortly after, Ma Xi'e sent his general Zhu Jinzhong (朱進忠) to attack Yiyang. Ma Xiguang's officer Zhang Hui (張暉) abandoned Yiyang and fled back to Tan, causing the town to fall. Zhu then persuaded Ma Xi'e to lead another assault on Tan. Ma Xi'e agreed and headed toward Tan, leaving his son Ma Guangzan (馬光贊) in charge at Lang, and also claiming for himself the title of Prince of Shuntian.

With Ma Xi'e approaching, Ma Xiguang put his main army in the command of the general Xu Keqiong to try to defend against Ma Xi'e's attack, on the account that Xu was the son of Ma Yin's trusted general Xu Dexun. He made Ma Xichong the monitor of Xu Keqiong's army. The cavalry commander Li Yanwen (李彥溫) and the infantry commander Han Li (韓禮) were also stationed to block off other potential paths for Ma Xi'e army.

Soon, Zhu arrived with Ma Xi'e's forward troops and camped with a mix of 7,000 Han and non-Han troops west of the Xiang River across from Changsha. The non-Han officer Peng Shigao (彭師暠), who had long been thankful for Ma Xiguang's trust and had sworn to be willing to die for Ma Xiguang, advocated that he be allowed to take some men to circle around Zhu's troops and attack it from the rear while Xu did so from the front, believing that once Zhu's forward troops were defeated, Ma Xi'e would give up his campaign. Ma Xiguang was ready to follow Peng's advice, but Xu, whom Ma Xi'e had already secretly contacted and enticed with an offer that they would divide the kingdom among themselves, opposed (as he was ready to accept Ma Xi'e's offer), stating to Ma Xiguang, "Peng Shigao is of the same kind as the Meishan barbarians, so how can you trust him? I, Xu Keqiong, and my family have been serving as Chu generals for generations, and will surely not disappoint you. There is nothing Ma Xi'e can do." Soon, when Ma Xi'e arrived with his fleet, his and Xu's fleet set up opposing lines across the Xiang. Xu, without letting his soldiers know, met with Ma Xi'e and continued negotiating with him, finally agreeing to his terms. Peng realized this, and went to Ma Xiguang, stating to him, "Xu Keqiong is about to commit treason. Everyone knows this. Please immediately execute him to stop this." Ma Xiguang, not believing Peng, responded, "He is Chancellor Xu's son. How would this happen?" Peng left his presence and lamented, but could do nothing else further. Meanwhile, due to a serious snow storm, neither army could engage the other. Ma Xiguang, who believed in the advice of sorcerers and Buddhist monks, make statutes of monsters with raised hands, believing that this would stop the Wuping army. He also had many monks chant Buddhist sutras, and wore the robes of a monk himself, in hope of gaining blessings.

Early in the morning on January 21, 951, Ma Xi'e's officer He Jingzhen (何敬真), seeing that Han's flags were in disarray, believed that that was a sign that Han's army was in disarray, and therefore launched an attack against Han. Han's army was defeated, and Han died from injuries. The Wuping army then used the opportunity to make a fierce assault on Changsha. Ma Xiguang's other infantry commander, Wu Hong (吳宏), and Yang Di, fought hard to try to resist the Wuping army's assault from the early morning to noon, but eventually, Yang's army was worn out, without any aid coming from either Xu or Liu Yantao. Ma Xi'e's non-Han soldiers set fire to Changsha's east wall, and when the defenders requested that Xu come to their aid, Xu instead surrendered to Ma Xi'e, and Changsha thereafter fell. Li Yanwen tried to return to the city to save it, but could not, and he and Liu thereafter escorted the sons of Ma Xifan and Ma Xiguang to flee to Southern Tang. Ma Xi'e captured Wu and Peng, but, admiring them for their bravery and faithfulness to Ma Xiguang, spared both of them, although Peng was caned and reduced to commoner rank. Meanwhile, as the city fell, Ma Xiguang and his wife, as well as one or more sons (the one(s) who did not flee with Li and Liu) secreted themselves at Ci Hall (慈堂), as Ma Xi'e's soldiers pillaged Changsha. Ma Xichong led the Chu officials in welcoming Ma Xi'e into the city and requested that he take the throne.

On January 22, 951, Ma Xi'e entered Changsha and took over. He closed the gates and subsequently was able to capture Ma Xiguang, Li Honggao, Li Honggao's brother Li Hongjie (李弘節), Deng, Yang, and the official Tang Zhaoyin (唐昭胤). Ma Xi'e said to Ma Xiguang, "Is there not an order between elder and younger when it comes to inheriting the achievements of father and brother?" Ma Xiguang responded, "It was because of the support of the generals and officials, and commission by the Emperor." Ma Xi'e put him under arrest.

== Reign ==
On January 24, 951, Ma Xi'e claimed the titles of Prince of Chu, Tiance Grand General (天策上將軍, a traditional title for Chu rulers since Ma Yin), and military governor of Wu'an, Wuping, Jingjiang, and Ningyuan (寧遠, headquartered in modern Yulin, under Southern Han control but claimed in the past by Chu) Circuits. He had Li Honggao, Li Hongjie, Tang Zhaoyin, and Yang Di put to death and had their bodies eaten by the soldiers. Deng Yiwen was also executed. On January 25, 951, Ma Xi'e publicly asked the generals and officials, "Ma Xiguang is just a coward who was controlled by his associates. May I spare his life?" No one dared to respond, but Zhu Jinzhong, whom had once been caned by Ma Xiguang, spoke up and stated, "Your Royal Highness spent three years in battle to gain Changsha. A state cannot have two lords. If you allow him to live, you will regret it." Later that day, Ma Xi'e ordered Ma Xiguang to commit suicide. He commissioned Ma Guangzan as the acting military governor of Wuping, and sent He Jingzhen back to Lang to serve as the commander of the guard troops there. He tried to recall Tuoba Heng back to governmental service, but Tuoba refused, claiming to be ill.

In spring 951, Ma Xi'e sent his secretary Liu Guangfu (劉光輔) to offer tributes to Southern Tang's emperor Li Jing. Li Jing conferred on him the titles of Tiance Grand General, military governor of Wu'an, Wuping, Jingjiang, and Prince of Chu, sending the chancellor Sun Sheng and the diplomat Yao Feng (姚鳳) to preside over the conferral ceremony. While at the Southern Tang capital Jinling, Liu was treated well by Li Jing, and he secretly informed Li Jing, "Hunan [(i.e., the Chu realm)] has tired people and an arrogant lord. It can be taken." Li Jing thereafter commissioned the officer Bian Hao as the prefect of Xin Prefecture (信州, in modern Shangrao, Jiangxi), but stationed him and his troops at Yuan Prefecture (袁州, in modern Yichun, Jiangxi), in anticipation of a potential chance to strike.

Meanwhile, after he took Changsha, Ma Xi'e became arrogant and spiteful, killing many people that he had grudges against. He spent day and night feasting, entrusting the matters of the headquarters to Ma Xichong. Ma Xichong governed based on his own likes and dislikes, causing the legal system to break down. Further, because the soldiers pillaged the state treasury, there was nothing left to reward them, so much wealth was extracted from civilians in order to do so, but the soldiers remained unsatisfied, and this displeasure included the soldiers from Lang. Further, Ma Xi'e favored the guard officer Xie Yanyong (謝彥顒) — a former house servant of his, whose relationship with him appeared to be sexual as Xie was described to have a beautiful face and was frequently seated with Ma Xi'e's concubines — such that, at feasts, Xie had a more honored seat than the generals, was involved in decision-making, and was even daring enough to pat Ma Xichong on the back, leading to Ma Xichong's and the generals' resentment.

As many of the state offices had been burned in the sack of Changsha, Ma Xi'e ordered the officers Wang Kui and Zhou Xingfeng to lead their soldiers in the rebuilding effort, without giving these soldiers additional pay and causing the soldiers to be resentful. Wang and Zhou, concerned that the soldiers might mutiny, decided to rebel against Ma Xi'e. One night, they led their soldiers and left Changsha without leave. No one dared to alert Ma Xi'e, as he was drunk and sleeping. After he woke up, he sent the officer Tang Shizhu (唐師翥) to chase after Wang and Zhou, but he could not catch up to them until they had reached Lang, where they laid a trap and defeated him; he barely escaped with his life. Wang and Zhou took over Lang and deposed Ma Guangzan, instead declaring Ma Xi'e's nephew Ma Guanghui (son of Ma Yin's oldest son Ma Xizhen (馬希振)) to be military governor of Wuping, but with Wang and Zhou controlling the circuit with He Jingzhen and Zhang Fang (張倣) also part of the leadership. When Ma Xi'e informed Li Jing of this, Li Jing sent an emissary with monetary rewards to Lang, hoping to get the Lang officers to submit. However, they took the rewards, returned the emissary, and did not follow Li Jing's edict. Shortly after, they deposed Ma Guanghui as well and supported Liu Yan the prefect of Chen to serve as the acting military governor. When Li Jing subsequently refused to commission Liu as military governor, the circuit instead pledged allegiance to Later Han's successor state Later Zhou.

Ma Xi'e considered what to do with the Lang situation. Believing that Xu Keqiong would resent him because he did not carry out the terms that he originally promised Xu (i.e., to divide Chu and rule with Xu), he sent Xu away to serve as the prefect of Meng Prefecture (蒙州, in modern Wuzhou, Guangxi), while stationing the officers Xu Wei (徐威), Chen Jingqian (陳敬遷), Lu Gongguan (魯公館), and Lu Mengjun (陸孟俊) northwest of the city to defend against a possible attack from Wuping. These officer and their soldiers, however, resented him for not trying to comfort them. At night on October 22, 951, the officers mutinied, with Ma Xichong's foreknowledge. Ma Xi'e tried to flee, but was captured. Xie was executed by being cut into pieces. The officers declared Ma Xichong to be the acting military governor of Wuping, and delivered Ma Xi'e to Hengshan (衡山, in modern Hengyang, Hunan) to be put under arrest there. As Ma Xichong was aware that Ma Xi'e had whipped Peng Shigao, he had Peng escort Ma Xi'e to Hengshan, and was expecting that Peng would kill him. However, Peng saw through Ma Xichong's plan, and commented, "You want me to be someone who murders his lord!" He thereafter treated Ma Xi'e with respect and escorted him safely to Hengshan.

== After his reign ==
When Ma Xi'e arrived at Hengshan, the commander of the Hengshan garrison, Liao Yan (廖偃), stated to his uncle Liao Kuangning (廖匡凝), "Our family had, for generations, received the grace of the Ma family. Now Ma Xi'e, who is the oldest, has been deposed, and will surely suffer disaster. We should support him." He mobilized the people who lived in the territory into an army corps, and, along with Peng Shigao, declared Ma Xi'e the Prince of Hengshan. They built defensive fences on the Xiang river and began to build warships out of bamboo. They soon gathered over 10,000 men and received support from nearby prefectures. Liao Yan also sent his assistant Liu Xuji (劉虛己) to seek aid from Southern Tang.

Meanwhile, Xu Wei came to see Ma Xichong as someone who would amount to nothing, and feared attacks from Ma Xi'e and Liu Yan, and therefore considered killing Ma Xichong. Ma Xichong, realizing this, decided to surrender the remaining parts of Chu lands to Southern Tang. Li Jing sent Bian Hao and his troops toward Changsha to accept the surrender. Upon hearing this, Ma Xi'e was hopeful that Li Jing would name him the military governor of Wu'an, but the people of Changsha resented Ma Xi'e greatly, and petitioned Li Jing to have Bian remain as the military governor of Wu'an, and Li Jing thereafter commissioned Bian. Bian thereafter forced Ma Xichong and his family to leave Changsha and head for the Southern Tang capital Jinling, ending the Ma family's rule of the Chu lands. He also sent the officer Li Chengjian (李承戬) to Hengshan to compel Ma Xi'e to head to Jinling as well. Shortly after, Ma Xi'e took his army and headed for Jinling. Upon his arrival at Jinling, Li Jing commissioned Ma Xi'e as the governor (觀察使, Guanchashi) of Jiangnan West Circuit (江南西道, headquartered in modern Nanchang, Jiangxi) and have him stationed Jiangnan West's capital Hong Prefecture (洪州), and continued to have him carry the title of Prince of Chu; Li Jing also bestowed on him the honorary chancellor title of Zhongshu Ling (中書令).

Around new year 953, Ma Xi'e went to Jinling to pay homage to Li Jing. This time, Li Jing kept him at Jinling and did not allow him to return to Hong. He died several years later at Jinling.

== Notes and references ==
- Old History of the Five Dynasties, vol. 133.
- New History of the Five Dynasties, vol. 66.
- Spring and Autumn Annals of the Ten Kingdoms, vol. 69.
- Zizhi Tongjian, vols. 287, 288, 289, 290, 291.

Chinese nobility
Preceded by Ma Xiguang	Ruler of Chu; 951	Succeeded by Ma Xichong
Preceded by Ma Xiguang	Ruler of China (Southeastern Hunan/Northeastern Guangxi) (de facto); 951	Succeeded by Ma Xichong
Preceded by Ma Xifan (Prince Wenzhao)	Ruler of China (Northwestern Hunan) (de facto); 947–951	Succeeded by Ma Guanghui
