= Xu Keqiong =

Xu Keqiong (許可瓊) was a general of the Chinese Five Dynasties and Ten Kingdoms Period state Chu. When, in Chu's last years, the realm was torn in a civil war between Ma Xiguang and Ma Xi'e (Prince Gongxiao), Xu betrayed Ma Xiguang, leading to Ma Xi'e's victory.

== Background ==
It is not known when Xu Keqiong was born. He was a son of the great Chu chancellor Xu Dexun. While it is not known when he began his military career, by 950, he had become the commander of the fleet because of prior accomplishments.

== Betrayal of Ma Xiguang ==
As of 950, Chu was torn by a civil war, as then-prince Ma Xiguang was facing the challenge to his rule by his older brother Ma Xi'e the military governor (Jiedushi) of Wuping Circuit (武平, headquartered in modern Changde, Hunan). In late 950, Ma Xi'e's forces approached the capital Changsha, and Ma Xiguang stationed the fleet under Xu Keqiong's command to defend an attack on water, while having the cavalry commander Li Yanwen (李彥溫) and infantry commander Han Li (韓禮) also taking their troops to defend other potential routes of attack. Soon, Zhu Jinzhong (朱進忠), a general under Ma Xi'e, arrived with Ma Xi'e's forward troops and camped with a mix of 7,000 Han and non-Han troops west of the Xiang River across from Changsha.

Ma Xiguang greatly trusted Xu, and had the other generals serve under his command, believing Xu to be a faithful and disciplined general. The non-Han officer Peng Shigao (彭師暠), who had long been thankful for Ma Xiguang's trust and had sworn to be willing to die for Ma Xiguang, advocated that he be allowed to take some men to circle around Zhu's troops and attack it from the rear while Xu did so from the front, believing that once Zhu's forward troops were defeated, Ma Xi'e would give up his campaign. Ma Xiguang was ready to follow Peng's advice, but Xu, whom Ma Xi'e had already secretly contacted and enticed with an offer that they would divide the kingdom among themselves, opposed (as he was ready to accept Ma Xi'e's offer), stating to Ma Xiguang, "Peng Shigao is of the same kind as the Meishan barbarians, so how can you trust him? I, Xu Keqiong, and my family have been serving as Chu generals for generations, and will surely not disappoint you. There is nothing Ma Xi'e can do." Soon, when Ma Xi'e arrived with his fleet, his and Xu's fleet set up opposing lines across the Xiang. Xu, without letting his soldiers know, met with Ma Xi'e and continued negotiating with him, finally agreeing to his terms. Peng realized this, and went to Ma Xiguang, stating to him, "Xu Keqiong is about to commit treason. Everyone knows this. Please immediately execute him to stop this." Ma Xiguang, not believing Peng, responded, "He is Chancellor Xu's son. How would this happen?" Peng left his presence and lamented, but could do nothing else further.

Early in the morning on January 21, 951, Ma Xi'e's officer He Jingzhen (何敬真), seeing that Han's flags were in disarray, believed that that was a sign that Han's army was in disarray, and therefore launched an attack against Han. Han's army was defeated, and Han died from injuries. The Wuping army then used the opportunity to make a fierce assault on Changsha. Ma Xiguang's other infantry commander, Wu Hong (吳宏), and Yang Di (楊滌), fought hard to try to resist the Wuping army's assault from the early morning to noon, but eventually, Yang's army was worn out, without any aid coming from either Xu or another commander Liu Yantao (劉彥瑫). Ma Xi'e's non-Han soldiers set fire to Changsha's east wall, and when the defenders requested that Xu come to their aid, Xu instead surrendered to Ma Xi'e, and Changsha thereafter fell. Ma Xi'e seized the throne, and subsequently forced Ma Xiguang to commit suicide.

== After Ma Xi'e's victory ==
Ma Xi'e, after his victory, neither carried out his promise to Xu Keqiong (to divide Chu among them) nor gave him any particular rewards. Suspecting that Xu would resent him, he sent Xu out to Meng Prefecture (蒙州, in modern Wuzhou, Guangxi) to serve as its prefect. Meanwhile, Ma Xi'e also sent the general Peng Yanhui (彭彥暉) to Jingjiang Circuit (靜江, headquartered in modern Guilin, Guangxi) to take control of the circuit, drawing resentment from his younger brother Ma Xiyin, who was then the deputy military governor of the circuit. Ma Xiyin secretly summoned Xu to come to Gui to oppose Peng with him. Xu thereafter arrived at Gui and defeated Peng in battle; Peng abandoned Gui and fled to Hengshan (衡山, in modern Hengyang, Hunan), where Ma Xi'e was at that time after being overthrown by another brother, Ma Xichong. Xu stayed at Gui, in alliance with Ma Xiyin.

However, with Xu having abandoned Meng, the Southern Han general Wu Huai'en (吳懷恩) seized it and proceeded to approach Jingjiang's capital Gui Prefecture (桂州), pillaging the circuit at will. Meanwhile, Ma Xichong, finding his own position untenable, surrendered the remaining parts of the Chu realm that he still had control over to Southern Tang, leaving Ma Xiyin without possible reinforcements from Chu proper. Ma Xiyin and Xu did not know what to do, and then spent time drinking and crying together. Ma Xiyin considered surrendering to Southern Han, but could not resolve to do so. When Wu quickly reached Gui Prefecture, Ma Xiyin and Xu instead abandoned it and fled to Quan Prefecture (全州, in modern Guilin). Xu died at Quan thereafter.

== Notes and references ==
- Spring and Autumn Annals of the Ten Kingdoms, vol. 74.
- Zizhi Tongjian, vols. 289, 290.
