= Ma Xiguang =

Prince of Chu from 947 to 951

Ma Xiguang 馬希廣
- Prince of Chu

Prince of Chu
- Tenure: 31 July 947 – 21 January 951
- Predecessor: Ma Xifan
- Successor: Ma Xi'e

Jiedushi of Wu'an Circuit (武安軍節度使)
- Tenure: 31 July 947 – 21 January 951 (Acting: 2 June–31 July 947)
- Predecessor: Ma Xifan
- Successor: Ma Xi'e
- Born: Unknown; Likely Changsha
- Died: 25 January 951; Changsha
- Burial: 951; Changsha
- Wife: Wife, name unknown
- Issue: One or more sons, name(s) unknown
Names
- Mǎ Xīguǎng (馬希廣)
Era dates
- Adopted the era names of Later Han: Tianfu (天福): 947; Qiányòu (乾祐): 948–951
Posthumous name
- None
- House: Ma
- Dynasty: Ma Chu
- Father: Ma Yin
- Mother: Lady Chen

Ma Xiguang (traditional Chinese: 馬希廣; simplified Chinese: 马希广; pinyin: Mǎ Xīguǎng; died 25 January 951), courtesy name Depi (德丕), was the fourth ruler of the Chinese Ma Chu dynasty during the Five Dynasties and Ten Kingdoms period.

== Background ==
It is not known when Ma Xiguang was born. He was Chu's founder Ma Yin (King Wumu)'s 35th son, and was the full younger brother of his fourth son Ma Xifan, both born of his concubine Lady Chen. As Ma Yin, at the time of his death in 930, ordered that his sons succeed each other based on age, Ma Xifan succeeded their older brother Ma Xisheng in 932 upon Ma Xisheng's death. During Ma Xifan's reign, Ma Xiguang, who was said to be careful and obedient in his disposition, was particularly beloved by Ma Xifan.

As of 947, Ma Xiguang carried the titles of deputy military governor of Chu's capital circuit Wu'an (武安, headquartered at Chu's capital Changsha) (with Ma Xifan himself being the military governor (Jiedushi), army commander of the Tiance Headquarters (as Ma Xifan was the Tiance Grand General (天策上將軍)), and military governor of Zhennan Circuit (鎮南, headquartered in modern Nanchang, Jiangxi — an honorary title as Zhennan was then the possession of Chu's northeastern neighbor Southern Tang). Ma Xifan had him oversee the headquarters matters. When Ma Xifan died suddenly in 947 without designating an heir, his staff members discussed who should be invited to succeed him. The officers Zhang Shaodi (張少敵) and Yuan Yougong (袁友恭) argued that Ma Yin's 30th son Ma Xi'e, who was then serving as the military governor of Wuping Circuit (武平, headquartered in modern Changde, Hunan) and acting prefect of Yong Prefecture (永州, in modern Yongzhou, Hunan), and who was the oldest surviving son of Ma Yin's, should be invited to succeed. The officers Liu Yantao (劉彥瑫) and Yang Di (楊滌) and the officials Li Honggao (李弘皋) and Deng Yiwen (鄧懿文) wanted to support Ma Xiguang. Zhang stated, "Yong Prefecture is older and is strong-willed, and will surely not willingly serve under the Commander. If we are to support the Commander, we must think of a careful strategy to control Yong Prefecture such that he will not move against the Commander. Otherwise, the state will be endangered." The senior official Tuoba Heng (拓跋恆) also stated, "Even though Master 35 governs the matters of the headquarters, Master 30 is older. Master 35 should send an emissary to offer to yield. Otherwise, a dispute will surely result." However, Liu and his partisans stated, "Today, the governance is in your hands. If you refuse what Heaven gives to you and let someone else take it, where will we be in the future?" Ma Xiguang, who was weak-willed and not sure what to do, allowed Liu and the others to announce that it was Ma Xifan's will that he succeed to the throne. Zhang, knowing that disaster was coming, claimed illness and withdrew from headquarters, as did Tuoba.

== Reign ==
=== Initial stage ===
In fall 947, Liu Zhiyuan the emperor of Later Han, who had just recently taken over the Central Plains, bestowed on Ma Xiguang (whose Chu state was traditionally a vassal of the Central Plains states) the titles of Tiance Grand General, military governor of Wu'an, overall commander of the circuits south of the Yangtze River, Zhongshu Ling (中書令), and Prince of Chu.

Meanwhile, Ma Xiguang's younger half-brother Ma Xichong, who was a full brother to Ma Xi'e, had been writing secret letters to Ma Xi'e, inciting him by arguing that Liu Yantao and the others had gone against Ma Yin's instructions. When Ma Xi'e was approaching Changsha from Yong in order to mourn Ma Xifan, Ma Xiguang, at Liu's suggestion, sent the guard commander Zhou Tinghui (周廷誨) with a fleet to intercept him at Dieshi (跌石), where he ordered the Yong soldiers to be disarmed before they would be allowed to approach Changsha further. He housed Ma Xi'e at Bixiang Palace (碧湘宮) and had Ma Xi'e mourn there, not allowing him to go to Ma Xiguang's palace to meet with Ma Xiguang. After mourning, Ma Xi'e requested permission to return to Wuping's capital Lang Prefecture (朗州). Zhou suggested to Ma Xiguang that he kill Ma Xi'e, but Ma Xiguang responded, "How would I have the heart to kill my older brother? I would rather divide Tan (潭州, i.e., Changsha) and Lang and govern them separately." He gave Ma Xi'e many gifts and allowed him to return to Lang. However, Ma Xichong continued to spy on Ma Xiguang and enticed Ma Xi'e to rebel, offering to assist him if he did.

In fall 948, Liu Sheng, the emperor of Chu's southern neighbor Southern Han, sent his official Zhong Yunzhang (鍾允章) as an emissary to Chu, asking that the states enter a marriage. (The states had previously entered such a marriage, as Liu Sheng's father Liu Yan had married Ma Xiguang's Empress Ma as his empress.) Ma Xiguang refused. This angered Liu Sheng, who then asked Zhong for his impressions about Chu, "Is Lord Ma capable of managing a campaign to the south?" Zhong responded, "The Ma brothers are busy with their infighting. How would they be able to damage us?" Liu Sheng, pleased, stated, "True. Ma Xiguang is cowardly and miserly, and his soldiers have long forgotten about war. This is the time for me to advance." Late in the year, Liu Sheng sent the eunuch general Wu Huai'en (吳懷恩) to attack Chu, and captured He (賀州, in modern Hezhou, Guangxi) and Zhao (昭州, in modern Guilin, Guangxi) Prefectures.

Meanwhile, Ma Xi'e submitted a petition to then-Later Han emperor Liu Chengyou (Liu Zhiyuan's son and successor) that he be allowed to separately submit tributes to the emperor and requested a commission separate from Ma Xiguang (in essence, asking that the Chu state be divided formally). Ma Xiguang, under advice by his guard officer Ou Honglian (歐弘練) and liaison to the Later Han court Zhang Zhongxun (張仲荀), sent many gifts to the high-level officials that Liu Zhiyuan left in charge of Liu Chengyou's administration, asking them to reject Ma Xi'e's proposal. As a result, Liu Chengyou issued an edict to both Ma Xi'e and Ma Xiguang, stating, "Brothers should have harmony. Whatever Ma Xi'e wants to submit should be submitted under Ma Xiguang's." Ma Xi'e was displeased.

=== War with Ma Xi'e ===
In 949, Ma Xi'e openly rose against Ma Xiguang. He mobilized the men of Lang and built 700 ships, intending to attack Tan, despite his wife Lady Yuan's urging against such action. When Ma Xiguang heard of this, he initially wanted to capitulate, stating, "Lang Prefecture is my older brother. I should not fight with him, and I shall yield the kingdom to him." Liu Yantao and Li Honggao urged him against doing so. He thereafter sent Wang Yun (王贇) the prefect of Yue Prefecture (岳州, in modern Yueyang, Hunan) to command an army against Ma Xi'e, with Liu serving as Wang's army monitor. Wang was able to defeat Ma Xi'e and capture 300 of Ma Xi'e's ships. Wang chased Ma Xi'e and came close to capturing him, but Ma Xiguang recalled his army, stating to him, "Do not harm my brother." When Ma Xi'e fled back to Lang, Lady Yuan, stating, "Disaster is coming, and I do not wish to see it," committed suicide by jumping into a well, but that did not stop Ma Xi'e's subsequent machinations. Shortly after, when the Later Han general Guo Wei suppressed the rebellion of the general Li Shouzhen, the Later Han government decided to reward many vassals with honorary titles, and Ma Xiguang received the title of Taiwei (太尉, one of the Three Excellencies). Meanwhile, Ma Xiguang's younger brother Ma Xizhan (馬希瞻) the military governor of Jingjiang Circuit (靜江, headquartered in modern Guilin), had been sending emissaries to both Ma Xi'e and Ma Xiguang, hoping to stop their wars, but neither listened to him. In fear that this would lead to the Ma clan's destruction, Ma Xizhan developed ulcers on his back and died.

Ma Xi'e, after his initial defeat, decided to write the leaders of the non-Han tribes of Chen (辰州) and Xu (漵州) (both in modern Huaihua, Hunan), as well as the Meishan Tribes (梅山蠻, centered on the region of modern Yiyang, Hunan), inviting them to attack Tan with him. The tribal leaders had long heard of Changsha's wealth, and were enticed, and so they jointly attacked Yiyang (益陽, in modern Yiyang) with him. When Ma Xiguang sent the officer Chen Fan (陳璠) to resist them, Chen was defeated and killed. Subsequently, the officers Zhang Yansi (張延嗣) and Huang Chuchao (黃處超) were also killed by the joint army. This caused great shock among the people at Tan, and Ma Xiguang then sent the officer Cui Honglian (崔洪璉) to take up defense position at Yutan (玉潭, in modern Changsha), preparing for Ma Xi'e's assault.

Meanwhile, Ma Xi'e had not given up on persuading the Later Han government to side with him, and he sent an emissary to the Later Han court, asking to be allowed to establish an independent liaison office at Daliang. Liu Chengyou denied the request on the basis that the Chu state already had a liaison office. Ma Xi'e, believing that Later Han's government intended to protect Ma Xiguang, decided to submit as a vassal to Southern Tang instead and requested Southern Tang aid against Ma Xiguang. Southern Tang's emperor Li Jing accepted his submission, bestowed an honorary chancellorship on him, and rewarded him with one year of tax revenues from E Prefecture (鄂州, in modern Wuhan, Hubei). Southern Tang also sent the general He Jingzhu (何敬洙) with an army to aid Ma Xi'e. Ma Xiguang submitted a petition to the Northern Han court, asking for aid, specifically asking for Later Han to launch an army to be stationed at Li Prefecture (澧州, in modern Changde) to cut off potential aid by Southern Tang or Jingnan to Ma Xi'e.

In winter 950, Liu proposed that Ma Xiguang allow him to command an army to directly attack Lang, claiming that he could defeat and capture Ma Xi'e. Ma Xiguang agreed. When Liu led the army to Lang, he initially encountered no resistance, but soon fell into a trap set by Ma Xi'e's and the non-Han tribes' troops, such that his army was crushed. Ma Xiguang, in fear, opened up his treasury and rewarded much of the wealth to his soldiers, to try to keep his faith. Meanwhile, when reports were made to him that Ma Xichong was in communications with Ma Xi'e, suggestions were made to him that Ma Xichong be executed, but Ma Xiguang refused, stating, "If I myself kill my younger brother, how will I see the deceased king [(i.e., Ma Yin)] in the underworld?" Shortly after, Ma Xi'e sent his general Zhu Jinzhong (朱進忠) to attack Yiyang. Ma Xiguang's officer Zhang Hui (張暉) abandoned Yiyang and fled back to Tan, causing the town to fall. Zhu then persuaded Ma Xi'e to lead another assault on Tan. Ma Xi'e agreed and headed toward Tan, leaving his son Ma Guangzan (馬光贊) in charge at Lang, and also claiming for himself the title of Prince of Shuntian.

With Ma Xi'e approaching, Ma Xiguang put his main army in the command of the general Xu Keqiong to try to defend against Ma Xi'e's attack, on the account that Xu was the son of Ma Yin's trusted general Xu Dexun. He made Ma Xichong the monitor of Xu Keqiong's army. The cavalry commander Li Yanwen (李彥溫) and the infantry commander Han Li (韓禮) were also stationed to block off other potential paths for Ma Xi'e army.

Soon, Zhu arrived with Ma Xi'e's forward troops and camped with a mix of 7,000 Han and non-Han troops west of the Xiang River across from Changsha. The non-Han officer Peng Shigao (彭師暠), who had long been thankful for Ma Xiguang's trust and had sworn to be willing to die for Ma Xiguang, advocated that he be allowed to take some men to circle around Zhu's troops and attack it from the rear while Xu did so from the front, believing that once Zhu's forward troops were defeated, Ma Xi'e would give up his campaign. Ma Xiguang was ready to follow Peng's advice, but Xu, whom Ma Xi'e had already secretly contacted and enticed with an offer that they would divide the kingdom among themselves, opposed (as he was ready to accept Ma Xi'e's offer), stating to Ma Xiguang, "Peng Shigao is of the same kind as the Meishan barbarians, so how can you trust him? I, Xu Keqiong, and my family have been serving as Chu generals for generations, and will surely not disappoint you. There is nothing Ma Xi'e can do." Soon, when Ma Xi'e arrived with his fleet, his and Xu's fleet set up opposing lines across the Xiang. Xu, without letting his soldiers know, met with Ma Xi'e and continued negotiating with him, finally agreeing to his terms. Peng realized this, and went to Ma Xiguang, stating to him, "Xu Keqiong is about to commit treason. Everyone knows this. Please immediately execute him to stop this." Ma Xiguang, not believing Peng, responded, "He is Chancellor Xu's son. How would this happen?" Peng left his presence and lamented, but could do nothing else further. Meanwhile, due to a serious snow storm, neither army could engage the other. Ma Xiguang, who believed in the advice of sorcerers and Buddhist monks, make statutes of monsters with raised hands, believing that this would stop the Wuping army. He also had many monks chant Buddhist sutras, and wore the robes of a monk himself, in hope of gaining blessings.

Early in the morning on 21 January 951, Ma Xi'e's officer He Jingzhen (何敬真), seeing that Han's flags were in disarray, believed that that was a sign that Han's army was in disarray, and therefore launched an attack against Han. Han's army was defeated, and Han died from injuries. The Wuping army then used the opportunity to make a fierce assault on Changsha. Ma Xiguang's other infantry commander, Wu Hong (吳宏), and Yang Di, fought hard to try to resist the Wuping army's assault from the early morning to noon, but eventually, Yang's army was worn out, without any aid coming from either Xu or Liu Yantao. Ma Xi'e's non-Han soldiers set fire to Changsha's east wall, and when the defenders requested that Xu come to their aid, Xu instead surrendered to Ma Xi'e, and Changsha thereafter fell. Li Yanwen tried to return to the city to save it, but could not, and he and Liu thereafter escorted the sons of Ma Xifan and Ma Xiguang to flee to Southern Tang. Ma Xi'e captured Wu and Peng, but, admiring them for their bravery and faithfulness to Ma Xiguang, spared both of them. Meanwhile, as the city fell, Ma Xiguang and his wife, as well as one or more sons (the one(s) who did not flee with Li and Liu) secreted themselves at Ci Hall (慈堂), as Ma Xi'e's soldiers pillaged Changsha. Ma Xichong led the Chu officials in welcoming Ma Xi'e into the city and requested that he take the throne.

== Death ==
On 22 January 951, Ma Xi'e entered Changsha and took over. He closed the gates and subsequently was able to capture Ma Xiguang, Li Honggao, Li Honggao's brother Li Hongjie (李弘節), Deng Yiwen, Yang Di, and the official Tang Zhaoyin (唐昭胤). Ma Xi'e said to Ma Xiguang, "Is there not an order between elder and younger when it comes to inheriting the achievements of father and brother?" Ma Xiguang responded, "It was because of the support of the generals and officials, and commission by the Emperor." Ma Xi'e put him under arrest.

On 24 January 951, Ma Xi'e claimed the title of Prince of Chu. He had Li Honggao, Li Hongjie, Tang, and Yang put to death and had their bodies eaten by the soldiers. Deng was also executed. On 25 January 951, Ma Xi'e publicly asked the generals and officials, "Ma Xiguang is just a coward who was controlled by his associates. May I spare his life?" No one dared to respond, but Zhu Jinzhong, whom had once been caned by Ma Xiguang, spoke up and stated, "Your Royal Highness spent three years in battle to gain Changsha. A state cannot have two lords. If you allow him to live, you will regret it." Later that day, Ma Xi'e ordered Ma Xiguang to commit suicide. Ma Xiguang, as he neared death, recited sutras. Peng Shigao buried him outside Changsha's Liuyang Gate (瀏陽門).

== Notes and references ==
- Old History of the Five Dynasties, vol. 133.
- New History of the Five Dynasties, vol. 66.
- Spring and Autumn Annals of the Ten Kingdoms, vol. 69.
- Zizhi Tongjian, vols, 287, 288, 289.

Chinese nobility
Preceded by Ma Xifan (Prince Wenzhao)	Ruler of Chu; 947–951	Succeeded by Ma Xi'e (Prince Gongxiao)
Preceded by Ma Xifan (Prince Wenzhao)	Ruler of China (Southeastern Hunan/Northeastern Guangxi) (de facto); 947–951	Succeeded by Ma Xi'e (Prince Gongxiao)
