= Pan Shusi =

Ma Chu military figure (died 956)

Pan Shusi (Chinese: 潘叔嗣; ?–956) was a military figure of Ma Chu who was killed by Zhou Xingfeng. Pan was born in Langzhou (朗州), now modern Changde, Hunan. During his career, Pan Shusi was sent to execute Liu Yan. Pan would also later execute Wang Kui. Zhou Xingfeng then demoted Pan for murdering Wang, causing Pan to be angry and rebellious. Zhou then sent envoys to capture and behead Pan.

== Biography ==
Pan collaborated with Zhou Xingfen (周行逢) and Zhang Wenbiao (张文表).

=== Murder of Wang Kui ===
In May 954, the first year of the Xiande (显德) era of Guo Wei of the Later Zhou, Pan was appointed as the envoy (团练使 tuanlianshi) of Yue Prefecture (Hunan). After Wang Kui (王逵) captured Langzhou, Wang sent Pan to execute Liu Yan (刘言). Wang then passed through Yue Prefecture, while Wang's subordinates repeatedly asked for bribes from Pan, which Pan refused. As a result, Wang's soldiers reported back to Wang and accused Pan Shusi of attempting to rebel. Wang then treated Pan mercilessly, causing Pan to be afraid and live in fear.

In February 956 (3rd year of Xiande), Pan Shusi attacked Langzhou and executed Wang Kui outside Wuling city (武陵县). Pan felt that he was unable to convince others to follow him. Li Jian (李简) then led soldiers from Langzhou to Tan Prefecture (Hunan) to welcome Zhou Xingfeng into Langzhou.

=== Demotion ===
People suggested to Zhou that Pan Shusi be appointed as military envoy of the Wu'an Jiedushi (武安军节度使). However, Zhou said Pan murdered Wang Kui and accused Pan of the crime of genocide. The reason Zhou did not kill Pan immediately is because Pan took over Wuling and gave it to Zhou. Otherwise, Zhou said that if he appointed Pan as envoy of the jiedushi, everybody would view Zhou as an accomplice in the murder of Wang Kui. So for the time being, Zhou would demote Pan to a lower rank of marching commander (行军司马). Only next year, they would give Pan a Fu (tally).

And thus the governor of Hengzhou (衡州), Mo Hongwan (莫弘万) took control of Tan Prefecture, led his troops to Langzhou, and called his army the Wuping army (武平军). The Wu'an army stayed behind (留后) and reported to the Later Zhou court, with Pan Shusi as the marching commander.

Pan Shusi was so enraged at Zhou Xingfeng for being demoted that he refused to take office, saying that he was ill. Zhou Xingfeng said that he once served as a marching commander too, saying their power was equivalent to a jiedushi. Zhou observed that Pan Shusi was still not satisfied and thought that Pan wanted to kill Zhou.

Someone persuaded Zhou to abuse his position at Tan Prefecture to lure Pan to arrive, so that Zhou and others could arrest Pan. Zhou agreed with this plan. After Pan got news that he would get a new job, he was delighted and wanted to go immediately. Pan's confidants thought this was a trap and that Zhou was a fraud, but Pan ignored their warnings and naively went anyways without suspicion. Zhou sent envoys to greet Pan on the road, and they expressed condolences and exchanged pleasantries.

=== Death sentence and beheading ===
Pan entered the court to pay an audience. Before he reached the hall, Zhou Xingfeng sent someone to capture Pan. Zhou stood in the court and accused Pan, saying that Pan was a small officer with no great achievements. The chief commander Wang Kui made an exception and appointed Pan as tuanlianshi. However, Pan killed Wang instead. Zhou initially did not execute Pan for this crime and even asked Pan to become a marching commander. However, Pan disobeyed Zhou's order.

Pan knew that he was about to be executed. All he asked is for Zhou not to execute Pan's entire family. Zhou then beheaded Pan.

== See also ==
- Pan You
