= Ma Chu =

State of China (907–951) during the 5 Dynasties and 10 Kingdoms period

Chu 楚
- 907–951
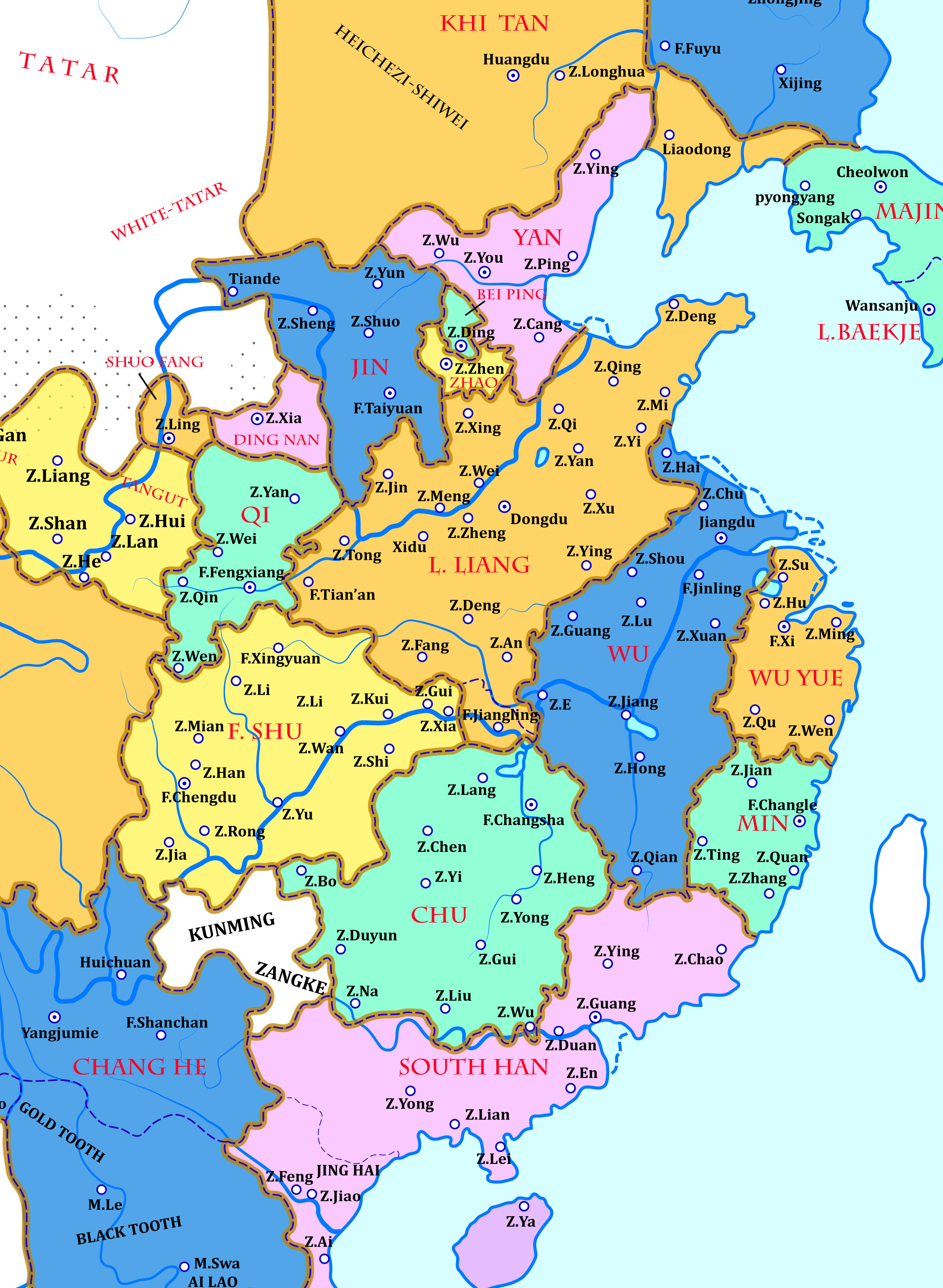
- Capital: Changsha
- Common languages: Middle Chinese; Medieval Xiang
- Government: Monarchy
- Prince/King
  - 907–930: Ma Yin
  - 950–951: Ma Xichong
- Historical era: Five Dynasties and Ten Kingdoms Period
  - Became the State: 907
  - establishment of the Kingdom: 927
  - Ended by Southern Tang: 951
- Currency: Silk, Cash coins (Iron)
Preceded by	Succeeded by
Tang dynasty	Southern Tang
- Today part of: China

Chu (Chinese: 楚; pinyin: Chǔ), known in historiography as Ma Chu (馬楚) or Southern Chu (南楚), was a dynastic state of China that existed from 907 to 951. It is counted as one of the Ten Kingdoms during the Five Dynasties and Ten Kingdoms period of Chinese history.

== Founding ==
Ma Yin was named regional governor by the Tang court in 896 after fighting against a rebel named Yang Xingmi. He declared himself as the Prince of Chu with the fall of the Tang dynasty in 907. Ma's position as Prince of Chu was confirmed by the Later Tang in the north in 927 and was given the posthumous title of King Wumu of Chu.

== Territories ==
The capital of the Chu Kingdom was Changsha (Tanzhou). The kingdom ruled over present-day Hunan and northeastern Guangxi.

== Economy ==
Chu was peaceful and prosperous under Ma Yin's rule, exporting horses, silk and tea. Silk and lead coinage were often used as currency, particularly with external communities which would not accept other coinage of the land. Taxation was low for the peasantry and merchants.

== Fall of Chu ==
After Ma Yin died the leadership was subject to struggle and conflict which resulted in the fall of the kingdom. The Southern Tang, fresh from its conquest of the Min Kingdom, took advantage and conquered the kingdom in 951. The ruling family was removed to the Southern Tang capital of Jinling. However, the following year, Chu generals rose against Southern Tang and expelled the Southern Tang expeditionary force, leaving the former Chu territory to be ruled by several of those generals called Wuping Jiedushi (武平军节度使) in succession.

Zhou Xingfeng (周行逢) ruled the Jiedushi from 956 to 962. In 956, Zhou Xingfeng executed and beheaded Pan Shusi (潘叔嗣), a general of the Southern Chu.

During these post-Chu years of de facto independence, the center of power was usually at Lang Prefecture (朗州, in modern Changde, Hunan).

In 963, the Wuping Jiedushi ended and its territory was seized by the Song dynasty.

== Rulers ==
Sovereigns in Chu Kingdom 907–951 (+ Rulers of Formerly Chu Lands 951–963)
Temple Names	Posthumous Names	Personal Names	Period of Reigns	Era Names and range
Did not exist	Wǔmù Wáng 武穆王	Mǎ Yīn 馬殷	907–930	Did not exist
Did not exist	None (commonly known as Prince of Hengyang (衡陽王; Héngyáng Wáng))	Mǎ Xīshēng 馬希聲	930–932	Did not exist
Did not exist	Wénzhāo Wáng 文昭王	Mǎ Xīfàn 馬希範	932–947	Did not exist
Did not exist	None (commonly known as Deposed Prince (廢王; Fèi Wáng))	Mǎ Xīguǎng 馬希廣	947–951	Did not exist
Did not exist	Gōngxìao Wáng 恭孝王	Mǎ Xī'è 馬希萼	951	Did not exist
Did not exist	Did not exist	Mǎ Xīchóng 馬希崇	951	Did not exist

== Ma rulers family tree ==
Ma Chu rulers family tree

Ma Yin 馬殷 (b. 853–d. 930); Wumu 楚武穆王 r. 907–930
Ma Xizhen 馬希振	Ma Xisheng 馬希聲 899–932 r. 930–932	Ma Xifan 馬希範 (899–947); Wénzhāo 文昭 r. 932–947	Ma Xiwang 馬希旺 d. ~933	Ma Xigao 馬希杲 d. 945	Mǎ Xī'è 馬希萼 r. 950–951	Mǎ Xīchóng 馬希崇 b.912 r. 950–951	Mǎ Xīguǎng 馬希廣 d.950 r. 947–950
Mǎ Guānghuì 马光惠
