= Wang Kui =

Chinese chemist

- 王夔
- Born: 7 May 1928; Tianjin, China
- Died: 6 July 2025 (aged 97); Beijing, China
- Education: Yenching University; Peking University
- Scientific career
- Fields: Inorganic chemistry
- Workplaces: Peking University Health Science Center

Wang Kui (Chinese: 王夔; pinyin: Wáng Kuí; 7 May 1928 – 6 July 2025) was a Chinese inorganic chemist who was a professor at Peking University Health Science Center, and an academician of the Chinese Academy of Sciences. He was a member of the 7th, 8th and 9th National Committee of the Chinese People's Political Consultative Conference.

== Biography ==
Wang was born in Tianjin, on 7 May 1928, and graduated from Yenching University and Peking University.

After graduation in 1952, Wang taught at the Pre-medical course of Peking University, and moved to the Department of Pharmacy, Beijing Medical College (now Peking University Health Science Center) a year later. He was promoted to director in 1983 and full professor and dean of the School of Pharmacy in 1985. In 1993, he became director of the Chemical Sciences Division, National Natural Science Foundation of China, a post he kept until 1998.

On 6 July 2025, Wang died in Beijing, at the age of 97.

== Honours and awards ==
- 1991 Member of the Chinese Academy of Sciences (CAS)
- 2000 Science and Technology Progress Award of the Ho Leung Ho Lee Foundation
