= 943 =

Calendar year

943 in various calendars
- Gregorian calendar: 943; CMXLIII
- Ab urbe condita: 1696
- Armenian calendar: 392; ԹՎ ՅՂԲ
- Assyrian calendar: 5693
- Balinese saka calendar: 864–865
- Bengali calendar: 349–350
- Berber calendar: 1893
- Buddhist calendar: 1487
- Burmese calendar: 305
- Byzantine calendar: 6451–6452
- Chinese calendar: 壬寅年 (Water Tiger); 3640 or 3433 — to — 癸卯年 (Water Rabbit); 3641 or 3434
- Coptic calendar: 659–660
- Discordian calendar: 2109
- Ethiopian calendar: 935–936
- Hebrew calendar: 4703–4704
- Hindu calendars
- Vikram Samvat: 999–1000
- Shaka Samvat: 864–865
- Kali Yuga: 4043–4044
- Holocene calendar: 10943
- Iranian calendar: 321–322
- Islamic calendar: 331–332
- Japanese calendar: Tengyō 6 (天慶６年)
- Javanese calendar: 843–844
- Julian calendar: 943; CMXLIII
- Korean calendar: 3276
- Minguo calendar: 969 before ROC 民前969年
- Nanakshahi calendar: −525
- Seleucid era: 1254/1255 AG
- Thai solar calendar: 1485–1486
- Tibetan calendar: ཆུ་ཕོ་སྟག་ལོ་ (male Water-Tiger); 1069 or 688 or −84 — to — ཆུ་མོ་ཡོས་ལོ་ (female Water-Hare); 1070 or 689 or −83

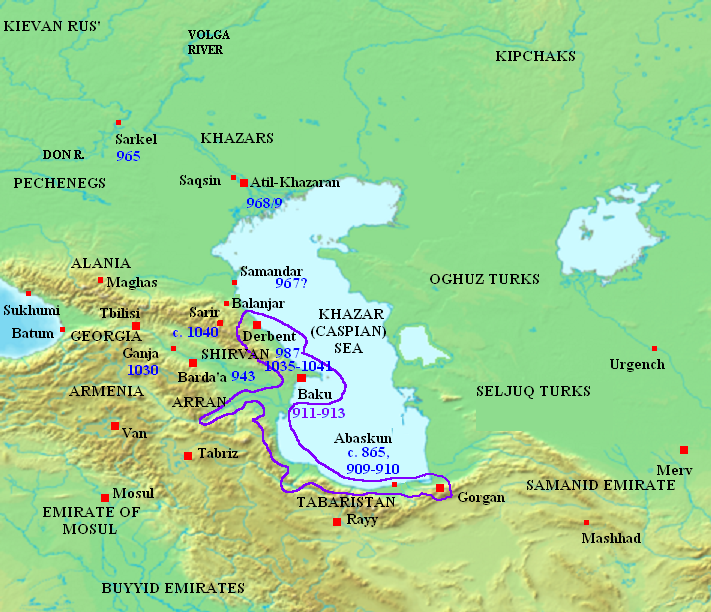
Map showing major Rus' raids (blue dates) in mid-9th to mid-11th century, around the Caspian Sea.

Year 943 (CMXLIII) was a common year starting on Sunday of the Julian calendar.

== Events ==
=== By place ===
==== Byzantine Empire ====
- Spring – Allied with the Rus', a Hungarian army raids Moesia and Thrace. Emperor Romanos I buys peace, and accepts to pay a yearly tribute (protection money) to the Hungarians. His frontiers now 'protected' on the Balkan Peninsula, Romanos sends a Byzantine expeditionary force (80,000 men) led by general John Kourkouas (his commander-in-chief) to invade northern Mesopotamia (modern Iraq).

==== Europe ====
- Caspian expeditions of the Rus': The Rus' under the Varangian prince Igor I of Kiev sail up the Kura River, deep into the Caucasus, and defeat the forces of the Sallarid ruler Marzuban ibn Muhammad. They capture the fortress city of Barda (modern Azerbaijan).
- Battle of Wels: A joint Bavarian–Carantanian army led by Bertold (duke of Bavaria) defeats the Hungarians near Wels (Upper Austria), who are attacked at a crossing of the Enns River at Ennsburg.

==== England ====
- King Edmund I ravages Strathclyde and defeats the Scottish king Constantine II, who has reigned as king of Alba since 900. Constantine, ruler of the 'Picts and Scots', abdicates to enter a monastery and yields control of his realm to his cousin Malcolm I.
- The Trinity Bridge at Crowland, Lincolnshire is described, in the 'Charter of Eadred'.

== Births ==
- Dayang Jingxuan, Chinese Zen Buddhist monk (d. 1027)
- Edgar I (the Peaceful), king of England (approximate date)
- Emma of Paris, duchess consort of Normandy (d. 968)
- Ibn Zur'a, Abbasid physician and philosopher (d. 1008)
- Matilda, queen consort of Burgundy (approximate date)

== Deaths ==
- February 23
  - David I, prince of Tao-Klarjeti (Georgia)
  - Herbert II, Frankish nobleman
- February 26 – Muirchertach mac Néill, king of Ailech (Ireland)
- March 16 – Pi Guangye, chancellor of Wuyue (b. 877)
- March 30 – Li Bian, emperor of Southern Tang (b. 889)
- April 6
  - Liu Churang, Chinese general (b. 881)
  - Nasr II, Samanid emir (b. 906)
- April 10 – Landulf I, prince of Benevento and Capua (Italy)
- April 15 – Liu Bin, emperor of Southern Han (b. 920)
- April 18 – Fujiwara no Atsutada, Japanese nobleman (b. 906)
- July 4 – Wang Kon, founder of Goryeo (Korea) (b. 877)
- July 26 – Motoyoshi, Japanese nobleman and poet (b. 890)
- November 8 – Liu, empress of Qi (Ten Kingdoms) (b. 877)
- Cao Zhongda, official and chancellor of Wuyue (b. 882)
- Gagik I of Vaspurakan, Armenian king (or 936)
- Liu Honggao, chancellor of Southern Han (b. 923)
- Sinan ibn Thabit, Persian physician (b. 880)
- Urchadh mac Murchadh, king of Maigh Seóla (Ireland)
- Xu Jie, Chinese officer and chancellor (b. 868)
- Zhang Yuxian, Chinese rebel leader (approximate date)
