= Zhao Sun =

Zhao Sun (趙損) (died 941) was an official of the Chinese Five Dynasties and Ten Kingdoms Period state Southern Han, serving for about a year as a chancellor.

== Background ==
Traditional histories did not provide information on when or where Zhao Sun was born. He was from a prominent aristocratic family, with his grandfather Zhao Yin's having served as a chancellor during the reign of the late Tang emperor Emperor Xuānzong. Zhao Sun's father Zhao Guangyi, as well as his uncles Zhao Guangfeng and Zhao Guangyin all served in the imperial government in the very late Tang times, as well as during Tang's successor state Later Liang.

In 908, Later Liang's emperor Zhu Quanzhong sent Zhao Guangyi and another official, Li Yinheng, to bestow the Later Liang vassal, the warlord Liu Yin, the titles of military governor (Jiedushi) of Qinghai (清海, headquartered in modern Guangzhou, Guangdong) and Jinghai (靜海, headquartered in modern Hanoi, Vietnam) Circuits. After the ceremony, however, Liu Yin did not allow Zhao or Li to return to the Later Liang court, but kept them to serve on his staff. In 917, when Liu Yin's brother and successor Liu Yan declared himself emperor of a new state of Yue — whose name was shortly after changed to Han and therefore became historically known as Southern Han — Zhao, Li, and another official, Yang Dongqian, were made chancellors.

Despite Zhao's service as Southern Han's chancellor, he had long longed to return to central China, as he felt that, as a member of a prominent Central Plains aristocratic family, it was shameful to serve for a regional state. Knowing this, Liu Yan wanted to comfort him, and therefore forged a letter in his handwriting style and sent a secret messenger to Luoyang to summon Zhao Sun and another son (Zhao Sun's brother) Zhao Yi (趙益) to Southern Han, and Zhao Sun and Zhao Yi subsequently took their families and went to Southern Han. Their arrivals was a pleasant surprise for Zhao Guangyi, and it was said that thereafter he wholeheartedly served Liu Yan.

== Service in Southern Han ==
Zhao Sun himself rose in the ranks of the Southern Han imperial government, eventually becoming chief imperial scholar (翰林學士承旨, Hanlin Xueshi Chengzhi) and Shangshu Zuocheng (尚書左丞), one of the secretaries general at the executive bureau of government (尚書省, Shangshu Sheng).

Zhao Guangyi died in 940. After Zhao Guangyi's death, Liu Yan commissioned Zhao Sun as chancellor (with the designation Tong Zhongshu Menxia Pingzhangshi (同中書門下平章事)) as well as Menxia Shilang (門下侍郎, deputy head of the examination bureau (門下省)). Zhao Sun himself died in 941, while still serving as chancellor.

== Notes and references ==
- Spring and Autumn Annals of the Ten Kingdoms, vol. 62.
- Zizhi Tongjian, vol. 282.
