= Liu Jun (Southern Han) =

Liu Jun (劉濬), courtesy name Boshen (伯深), was an official of the Chinese Five Dynasties and Ten Kingdoms Period state Southern Han, at one point serving as a chancellor.

== Background ==
It is not known when Liu Jun was born. His father Liu Chongwang was a prominent late-Tang official and served as a chancellor during the reign of Emperor Zhaozong. Several of his uncles, including Liu Chongwang's older brother Liu Chonggui (劉崇龜), were also prominent.

During Emperor Zhaozong's reign, the realm was in great turmoil. Sometime after Liu Chonggui's becoming the military governor (Jiedushi) of Qinghai Circuit (清海, headquartered in modern Guangzhou, Guangdong), early in Emperor Zhaozong's Dashun era (890–891), Liu Jun, wanting to avoid the turmoils, followed his uncle Liu Chonggui to Qinghai and became dependent on Liu Chonggui. He remained at Qinghai's capital Guang Prefecture (廣州) after Liu Chonggui's death in the middle of Emperor Zhaozong's Qianning era (894–898).

== Service under Liu Yin ==
Liu Chonggui had, in or around 894, commissioned Liu Yin as the defender of Heshui Base (賀水鎮, in modern Nanning, Guangxi), and then as the prefect of Feng Prefecture (封州, in modern Zhaoqing, Guangdong). Therefore, after Liu Yin subsequently became the military governor of Qinghai, first in an acting capacity in 901 and then officially in 904, Liu Yin, in showing gratitude to Liu Chonggui, treated Liu Jun with respect. He invited Liu Jun to serve on his staff, serving with Li Yinheng and Ni Shu, often consulting them on key decisions.

== Service under Liu Yan ==
In 917, Liu Yin's brother and successor Liu Yan, who had previously been a vassal of Tang's successor state Later Liang, declared himself emperor of a new state of Yue (later changed to Han, and therefore historically known as Southern Han). He commissioned Liu Jun as the minister of imperial clan affairs (宗正卿, Zhongzheng Qing) and deputy minister of public works (工部侍郎, Gongbu Shilang). Toward the end of Liu Yan's Qianheng era (917–925), there was a time when Liu Yan mobilized an army and placed it at Chao Prefecture (潮州, in modern Chaozhou, Guangdong), preparing to launch it against Southern Han's northeastern neighbor Min. Liu Jun found this inadvisable, so he discussed this with the chancellor Yang Dongqian. Yang agreed with him and tried to dissuade Liu Yan, to no avail. In 924, Liu Yan led the troops to take up a position between Min's Ting (汀州, in modern Longyan, Fujian) and Zhang (漳州, in modern Zhangzhou, Fujian) Prefectures. A Min army attacked him, and he was forced to withdraw. He thus greatly regretted not listening to Yang and Liu Jun.

After Yang died in 936, Liu Yan promoted Liu Jun to be chancellor, with the titles of Zhongshu Shilang (中書侍郎) and Tong Zhongshu Menxia Pingzhangshi (同中書門下平章事), to replace Yang. It was said that Liu Jun was honest and frugal. He often encouraged Liu Yan to love his people and rest his army, in terms that were delicate but firm. He died while serving as chancellor, but the date was not given. (As nothing was said about his serving under Liu Yan's successors, presumably he died before Liu Yan's death in 942.)

== Notes and references ==
- Zizhi Tongjian, vol. 280.
- Book of Southern Han (南漢書), vol. 10.
- Spring and Autumn Annals of the Ten Kingdoms, vol. 62.
