= Chen Wo =

Chen Wo (陳偓) was an official of the Chinese Five Dynasties and Ten Kingdoms Period state Southern Han, serving as a chancellor during the reign of its third emperor Liu Sheng (Emperor Zhongzong).

Little is known about Chen Wo's background. It was known that prior to chancellorship, he rose in Southern Han's official ranks up to the office of deputy minister of census (戶部侍郎, Hubu Shilang). In 944, he was given the provisional chancellor designation Zhi Zhengshi (知政事). After Liu Sheng had his brother Liu Hongchang the Prince of Yue, who was then the main chancellor, assassinated in 944, he made Chen a full chancellor with the designation Tong Zhongshu Menxia Pingzhangshi (同中書門下平章事). According to the Spring and Autumn Annals of the Ten Kingdoms, as chancellor, Chen "did not have any shortcomings or strengths; he was only filling the position." It was not stated when he left office or when he died.

== Notes and references ==
- Spring and Autumn Annals of the Ten Kingdoms, vol. 64.
- Zizhi Tongjian, vol. 284.
