= 941 =

Calendar year

941 in various calendars
- Gregorian calendar: 941; CMXLI
- Ab urbe condita: 1694
- Armenian calendar: 390; ԹՎ ՅՂ
- Assyrian calendar: 5691
- Balinese saka calendar: 862–863
- Bengali calendar: 347–348
- Berber calendar: 1891
- Buddhist calendar: 1485
- Burmese calendar: 303
- Byzantine calendar: 6449–6450
- Chinese calendar: 庚子年 (Metal Rat); 3638 or 3431 — to — 辛丑年 (Metal Ox); 3639 or 3432
- Coptic calendar: 657–658
- Discordian calendar: 2107
- Ethiopian calendar: 933–934
- Hebrew calendar: 4701–4702
- Hindu calendars
- Vikram Samvat: 997–998
- Shaka Samvat: 862–863
- Kali Yuga: 4041–4042
- Holocene calendar: 10941
- Iranian calendar: 319–320
- Islamic calendar: 329–330
- Japanese calendar: Tengyō 4 (天慶４年)
- Javanese calendar: 841–842
- Julian calendar: 941; CMXLI
- Korean calendar: 3274
- Minguo calendar: 971 before ROC 民前971年
- Nanakshahi calendar: −527
- Seleucid era: 1252/1253 AG
- Thai solar calendar: 1483–1484
- Tibetan calendar: ལྕགས་ཕོ་བྱི་བ་ལོ་ (male Iron-Rat); 1067 or 686 or −86 — to — ལྕགས་མོ་གླང་ལོ་ (female Iron-Ox); 1068 or 687 or −85

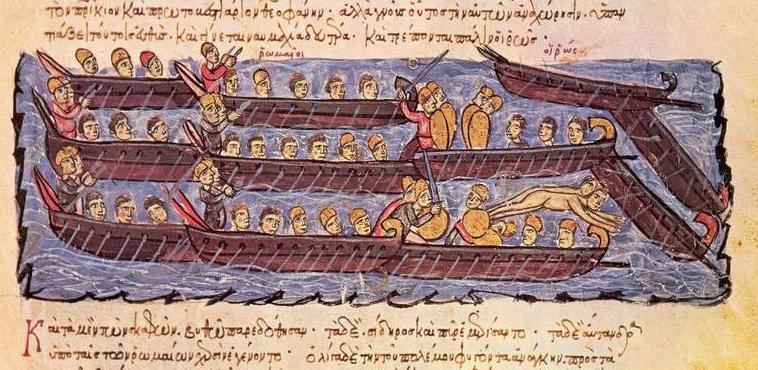
The Byzantines repel the Russian attack at Constantinople, using ships with Greek fire.

Year 941 (CMXLI) was a common year starting on Friday of the Julian calendar.

== Events ==
=== By place ===
==== Byzantine Empire ====
- May – September – Rus'–Byzantine War: The Rus' and their allies, the Pechenegs, under the Varangian prince Igor I of Kiev, cross the Black Sea with an invasion fleet of 1,000 ships (40,000 men) and disembark on the northern coast of Asia Minor. While the Byzantine fleet is engaged against the Arabs in the Mediterranean, the Rus' forces reach the gates of Constantinople. Emperor Romanos I organizes the defense of the capital and assembles 15 old ships (equipped with throwers of Greek fire) under the chamberlain (protovestiarios) Theophanes. The Byzantines repel the Rus' fleet (nearly annihilating the entire fleet) but can not prevent the invaders from pillaging the hinterland of Constantinople, venturing as far south as Nicomedia (modern-day İzmit). In September, John Kourkouas and Bardas Phokas ("the Elder"), two leading generals, destroy the Rus' forces in Thrace. Igor manages, with only a handful of boats, to escape to the Caspian Sea.

==== Europe ====
- Spring – Henry I, duke of Bavaria, plots to assassinate his brother, King Otto I, at the royal palace in Quedlinburg (modern Saxony-Anhalt), but the conspiracy is discovered and Henry is put in captivity in Ingelheim. He is released after doing penance at Christmas.
- Fall – Hugh of Provence, king of Italy, leads a fourth expedition to Rome to dislodge Alberic II. He proceeds to Lazio, preparing a campaign to capture the papal capital. Again the attacks fail and Hugh retreats to Milan.
- Olaf Guthfrithson, a Norse-Irish chieftain, is killed while raiding an ancient Anglian church at Tyninghame (Northern Northumbria). He is succeeded by his cousin Olaf Sigtryggsson as ruler of Jórvik (modern Yorkshire).

==== Middle East ====
- March 9 – The famed Green Dome of the Palace of the Golden Gate at Baghdad collapses, amidst heavy rainfall.

=== By topic ===
==== Religion ====
- Oda ("the Good") is appointed archbishop of Canterbury in England after the death of Wulfhelm.
- Kaminarimon, the eight-pillared gate to the Sensō-ji Buddhist temple in Tokyo, Japan, is erected.

== Births ==
- Brian Boru, High King of Ireland (approximate date) (d. 1014)
- Hugh Capet, first of the Capetian Kings of France (d. 996)
- Ibn Furak, Muslim imam, jurist and theologian (d. 1015)
- Lê Hoàn, emperor of the Early Lê Dynasty (Vietnam) (d.1005)
- Lothair III, king of the West Frankish Kingdom (d. 986)

== Deaths ==
- January 5 – Zhang Yanhan, Chinese chancellor (b. 884)
- February 12 – Wulfhelm, archbishop of Canterbury
- April 21 – Bajkam, Turkish military commander
- Abu Bakr Muhammad, Muslim governor
- Fujiwara no Sumitomo, Japanese nobleman
- Gurgen II, prince of Tao-Klarjeti (Georgia)
- Jayavarman IV, Angkorian king (Cambodia)
- Muhammad ibn Ya'qub al-Kulayni, Persian scholar (b. 864)
- Olaf Guthfrithson, Viking leader and king
- Órlaith íngen Cennétig, Irish queen
- Qian Yuanguan, king of Wuyue (b. 887)
- Rudaki ("Adam of Poets"), Persian poet (b. 858)
- Wang Dingbao, Chinese chancellor (b. 870)
- Zhao Sun, Chinese official and chancellor
