= Zhao Guangyi (Southern Han) =

Chinese Southern Han official (died 940)

Zhao Guangyi (Chinese: 趙光裔; died 940), courtesy name Huanye (煥業), was an official of the Chinese Southern Han dynasty, serving as chancellor for over two decades.

== Background ==
It is not known when Zhao Guangyi was born. His family was originally from Fengtian (奉天, in modern Xianyang, Shaanxi), but had later relocated to the Tang dynasty eastern capital Luoyang, although it is not clear whether he himself was born in Luoyang. His great-grandfather Zhao Zhi (趙植) was said to have served as the military governor (jiedushi) of Lingnan East Circuit (嶺南東道, headquartered in modern Guangzhou, Guangdong). Zhao Guangyi's grandfather Zhao Cunyue (趙存約) was an assistant to Li Jiang, the military governor of Shannan West Circuit (山南西道, headquartered in modern Hanzhong, Shaanxi), when Li and a large number of his staff members, including Zhao Cunyue, were killed in a mutiny in 830. Zhao Guangyi's father, Zhao Yin, was a prominent official who eventually became a chancellor during the reign of Emperor Xuānzong.

== During Tang ==
Zhao Guangyi was said to be a hard studier in his youth. He passed the imperial examinations in the Jinshi class in 887; his older brother Zhao Guangfeng had done so earlier, and his younger brother Zhao Guangyin would do so later. During the middle of the Qianning era (894–898) of Emperor Xuānzong's grandson Emperor Zhaozong, Zhao Guangyi was made a Sixun Langzhong (司勳郎中), a supervisory official at the ministry of civil service affairs (吏部, Lìbu), as well as a scholar at Hongwen Pavilion (弘文館). He was later made Shanbu Langzhong (膳部郎中), a supervisory official at the ministry of rites (禮部, Lǐbu, note different tone than the ministry of civil service affairs) and was in charge of drafting edicts. As Zhao Guangfeng was then at the more prestigious post of the chief imperial scholar and also drafting edicts, the brothers' elevation were considered an honor. Zhao Guangyi remained at those posts after Tang's destruction in 907 and succession by Later Tang.

== During Later Liang ==
Among warlords who were nominally vassals, but acting in fact independently, of Later Liang's founding emperor Emperor Taizu was Liu Yin, who was in control of Lingnan East—which had been renamed Qinghai Circuit (清海) by that point. In 908, Emperor Taizu sent Zhao Guangyi and another imperial official, Li Yinheng, to Qinghai to officially bestow on Liu Yin the titles of military governor of Qinghai and Jinghai (靜海, headquartered in modern Hanoi, Vietnam) Circuits. After the bestowment, however, Liu Yin did not allow Zhao and Li to return to Later Liang's capital Luoyang, but instead kept them at Qinghai. Liu Yin made Zhao his deputy military governor.

== During Southern Han ==
In 917, Liu Yin's brother and successor Liu Yan declared his domain a new state of Yue (shortly later renamed Han, and therefore known to historians as Southern Han), as its Emperor Gaozu. He commissioned Zhao Guangyi, Li Yinheng, and another official, Yang Dongqian, chancellors. Zhao was also made the minister of defense (兵部尚書).

Despite Zhao's service as Southern Han's chancellor, he had long longed to return to central China, as he felt that, as a member of a prominent Central Plains aristocratic family, it was shameful to serve for a regional state. Knowing this, Liu Yan wanted to comfort him, and therefore forged a letter in his handwriting style and sent a secret messenger to Luoyang to summon his two sons Zhao Sun and Zhao Yi (趙益) to Southern Han, and Zhao Sun and Zhao Yi subsequently took their families and went to Southern Han. Their arrivals were a pleasant surprise for Zhao Guangyi, and it was said that thereafter he wholeheartedly served Liu Yan.

Southern Han had, for some time, cordial relations with its northern neighbor Chu, whose founding king Ma Yin and his successors remained nominally vassals of Later Liang's (and later, its successor states Later Tang and Later Jin), and prior to his taking imperial title, Liu Yan had married a daughter of Ma Yin's in 915. After he declared himself emperor, he created her empress. After she died in 934, however, the relationship between the two states deteriorated, and Chu's prosperity became a major threat to Southern Han. In 939, Zhao spoke to Liu Yan about this, pointing out that the two states had not had formal relations since Empress Ma's death, and advocating that an emissary be sent to Chu. He further recommended the official Li Shu (李紓) as a suitable emissary. After Li's mission, Chu also sent emissaries to Southern Han, It was said that after these exchanges, there were no further troubles between Southern Han and Chu for the rest of Liu Yan's reign.

It was said that for the over two decades that Zhao served as chancellor, the Southern Han imperial storage was full, and that the borders were safe. He died around the new year 940. After his death, Liu Yan made Zhao Sun a chancellor to succeed him.

== Notes and references ==
- Spring and Autumn Annals of the Ten Kingdoms (十國春秋), vol. 62.
- Book of Southern Han (南漢書), vol. 9.
- Zizhi Tongjian, vols. 267, 270, 282.
