= Consort Dowager Zhao =

Consort Dowager Zhao (Chinese: 趙太妃; personal name unknown) was the mother of Liu Bin (Emperor Shang), the second emperor of the Chinese Southern Han dynasty. She was a concubine to Liu Bin's father, the founding emperor Liu Yan (Emperor Gaozu).

Very little is known about the future Consort Dowager Zhao's background. It is known that she was considered very beautiful and was favored by Liu Yan. In 920, she gave birth to his third son Liu Hongdu — who would effectively become his oldest son since Liu Hongdu's older brothers Liu Yaoshu (劉耀樞) and Liu Guitu (劉龜圖) would both die early. During Liu Yan's Dayou era (928-942), she would receive the imperial consort title Zhaoyi (昭儀).

Liu Yan died in 942 and was succeeded by Liu Hongdu, who changed his name to Liu Bin. He honored Consort Zhao as consort dowager, but not as empress dowager. In 943, his younger brother Liu Hongxi (Emperor Zhongzong), then the Prince of Jin, whom he had put in command of the government, had his associates Chen Daoxiang (陳道庠) and Liu Sichao (劉思潮) assassinate him, and Liu Hongxi subsequently took the throne. It is not known what occurred to Consort Dowager Zhao.
