= Wang Dingbao =

Chinese politician and general

Wang Dingbao (Chinese: 王定保) (870–941) was a Chinese military general, historian, poet, and politician of the Southern Han dynasty of China, serving as chancellor for less than a year.

== Background ==
According to the Tang Zhiyan (唐摭言, "selected words from Tang"), written by Wang Dingbao, Wang was born in 870, during the reign of Emperor Yizong of Tang. His family was from Nanchang. He passed the imperial examinations in the Jinshi class in 900, during the reign of Emperor Yizong's son Emperor Zhaozong. At some point, he married the daughter of the poet and official Wu Rong (吳融).

At one point, Wang travelled to the modern Hunan region but was not treated with respect by the warlord who then ruled the area, Ma Yin the military governor (Jiedushi) of Wu'an Circuit (武安, headquartered in modern Changsha, Hunan). He apparently then travelled further south, to Rong District (容管, headquartered in modern Yulin, Guangxi), and he became a surveyor for Rong District's government. At that time, there was great disturbance in the Central Plains region (which would eventually see Tang's fall and its succession by Later Liang, the first of the Five Dynasties), and Wang was unable to, after his term of service, return to the Central Plains. At that time, the warlord who ruled the Lingnan region, Liu Yin (Southern Han) the military governor of Qinghai Circuit (清海, headquartered in modern Guangzhou, Guangdong), was recruiting members of the intelligentsia to serve on his staff, and at Liu's invitation, Wang went to serve on his staff. (Even though Wang never returned to the Central Plains, his wife Lady Wu remained faithful to him and never remarried.)

== Service under Liu Yan ==
Liu Yin died in 911 and was succeeded by his brother Liu Yan. Wang Dingbao apparently continued to serve on Liu Yan's staff. In or shortly before 917, Liu Yan was considering declaring himself emperor of an independent state (rather than continuing to be Later Liang's vassal), but he was concerned that Wang might publicly oppose the move, and so he sent Wang on a diplomatic mission to Jingnan Circuit (荊南, headquartered in modern Jingzhou, Hubei). While Wang was away, on that mission, Liu Yan declared himself emperor of a new state of Yue (not long later changed to Han, and therefore historically known as Southern Han). Upon Wang's return to Southern Han's capital Xingwang (興王), Wang realized the reason he was sent away, but Liu Yan nevertheless treated him with respect, sending the official Ni Shu to meet him outside the city first to welcome him back and to report to him on how Liu Yan had taken the throne. Wang commented: "The establishment of a state should be done with propriety. When I entered the south gate [of Liu's palace, apparently converted from Qinghai headquarters], the beam still read, 'Qinghai Circuit.' How would that not be laughable?" Upon hearing Wang's comment, Liu himself laughed and responded, "I had long been concerned about Wang Dingbao, but I did not think of this. I deserve the scorn."

Early in Liu's Dayou era (928–942), Wang was made the military governor of Ningyuan Circuit (寧遠, i.e., the former Rong District, now converted into a circuit). Around the new year 941, after the death of the chancellor Zhao Sun, Liu recalled him from Ningyuan to serve as chancellor, with the designation Tong Zhongshu Menxia Pingzhangshi (同中書門下平章事) as well as Zhongshu Shilang (中書侍郎, deputy head of the legislative bureau of government (中書省, Zhongshu Sheng)). However, it was said that he died less than a year after becoming chancellor.

Wang was an accomplished writer. When Liu built a magnificent southern palace, Wang wrote a poem praising the seven particular beautiful portions of the palace, and those who read it were all impressed by the language. He also wrote the 15-volume work Tang Zhiyan, dealing with Tang's imperial examinations and anecdotes about the examinees.

== Notes and references ==
- Spring and Autumn Annals of the Ten Kingdoms, vol. 62.
- Zizhi Tongjian, vol. 282.
