= Lin Yanyu =

Lin Yanyu (Chinese: 林延遇) (died April 15, 956) was a powerful eunuch of the Southern Han dynasty of China.

== Background and initial arrival in Southern Han ==
It is not known when Lin Yanyu was born, and other than the fact that he was from Minqing (閩清, in modern Fuzhou, Fujian), nothing was recorded about his family background or how he became an eunuch. It was said that he had a treacherous personality and was a deep thinker.

At some point, Lin became a eunuch attendant to Wang Yanjun, who would have then been an officer under his father Wang Shenzhi, the founding Prince of Min. In 917, during Wang Shenzhi's reign, Wang Yanjun married Liu Hua, the niece of then-Southern Han emperor Liu Yan. Min thus established a liaison office at the Southern Han capital Xingwang (興王, in modern Guangzhou, Guangdong). Lin was sent to Xingwang to head the office, and was in charge of the communications between the two states. Liu Yan gave Lin a large mansion and much gifts. He often tried to ask Lin about the Min state. Lin refused to respond, but told others, "How would it be proper, for someone who is deep in the palace, to be talking of Min once he left Min and talking of Yue [(i.e., Southern Han, whose territory was also known as the Yue region)] once he left Yue?" When Liu Yan heard of this, he became more respectful of Lin. He gave Lin the title of Neichangshi (內常侍) and put Lin in charge of his own palace.

== Service at Southern Han court ==
In 935, Wang Yanjun, who was then the emperor of Min, was assassinated by his own son Wang Jipeng, who took the throne. When Lin Yanyu heard of this, he requested that Liu Yan allow him to return to Min. Liu refused. Lin then changed into mourning clothes and wept for three days in Min's direction.

During the subsequent reign of Liu Yan's son Liu Sheng, Liu Sheng made Lin the director of Ganquan Palace (甘泉宮), and trusted him deeply. It was said that Liu Sheng's frequent killings of his own brothers (under Liu Sheng's theory, to safeguard the throne for his son and heir Liu Jixing) was encouraged by and planned with Lin. This included Liu Hongmiao (劉弘邈) the Prince of Gao, whose suicide Liu Sheng sent Lin to force, in 954.

Lin fell ill in 956. He recommended another eunuch, Gong Chengshu, to succeed him, and then died. It was said that the people of the realm all rejoiced when they heard of Lin's death.

== Notes and references ==
- Spring and Autumn Annals of the Ten Kingdoms, vol. 66.
- Zizhi Tongjian, 270, 291, 293.
