= Consort Zhao =

Consort Zhao may refer to:

- Lady Gouyi (113–88 BC), or Consort Zhao of Emperor Wu of Han
- Zhao Hede (died 7 BC), Consort Zhao of Emperor Cheng of Han
- Zhao Feiyan (died 1 BC), empress of Emperor Cheng of Han
- Consort Dowager Zhao (fl. 10th century), a concubine of Emperor Liu Yan of Southern Han
