= Guangtian =

Guangtian (光天) was a Chinese era name used by several emperors of China. It may refer to:

- Guangtian (918), era name used by Wang Jian (Former Shu), emperor of Former Shu
- Guangtian (942–943), era name used by Liu Bin (Southern Han), emperor of Southern Han
