= Ma Xiyin =

Ma Xiyin (馬希隱) was a member of the Ma ruling house of Chu, one of the Five Dynasties and Ten Kingdoms states of China. After Chu's fall, he briefly continued to hold control of Chu's Jingjiang Circuit (靜江, headquartered in modern Guilin, Guangxi) before abandoning it in face of a Southern Han attack, allowing Southern Han to seize control of the circuit.

== Background ==
Ma Xiyin was a son of Chu's founder Ma Yin (King Wumu) — the youngest, according to the Zizhi Tongjian. During the subsequent reign of Ma Xiyin's older brother (Ma Yin's fourth son) Ma Xifan (Prince Wenzhao), Ma Xiyin was made the deputy military governor of Jingjiang.

By 950, Chu was embroiled in a civil war between Ma Xiyin's older brothers Ma Xiguang (Ma Yin's 35th son), who had taken the throne after Ma Xifan's death, and Ma Xi'e (Prince Gongxiao, Ma Yin's 30th son), who considered himself to have a superior claim on the throne. In light of Chu's civil war, Liu Sheng, the emperor of Chu's southern neighbor Southern Han, sent the eunuch general Wu Huai'en (吳懷恩) to the border between Southern Han and Jingjiang, trying to see if he could take advantage of the situation, so Ma Xiguang sent the general Peng Yanhui (彭彥暉) to Longtong (龍桐, in modern Guilin) to help defend the circuit. After Ma Xi'e defeated Ma Xiguang around new year 951 and took over the throne, Ma Xi'e promoted Peng to be the overseer of Jingjiang's capital Gui Prefecture (桂州) and acting military governor, displeasing Ma Xiyin. Ma Xiyin secretly summoned the general Xu Keqiong, who was then serving as the prefect of Meng Prefecture (蒙州, in modern Wuzhou, Guangxi), to come to Gui to oppose Peng with him. Xu thereafter arrived at Gui and defeated Peng in battle; Peng abandoned Gui and fled to Hengshan (衡山, in modern Hengyang, Hunan), where Ma Xi'e was at that time after being overthrown by another brother, Ma Xichong. Xu stayed at Gui, in alliance with Ma Xiyin.

== After Chu's fall ==
Xu Keqiong's abandoning of Meng allowed Wu Huai'en to seize it, and then approach Gui, pillaging the territory of Jingjiang. Meanwhile, Ma Xichong, finding his own position untenable, surrendered the remaining parts of the Chu realm that he still had control over to Southern Tang, leaving Ma Xiyin without possible reinforcements from Chu proper. Ma Xiyin and Xu did not know what to do, and then spent time drinking and crying together.

Liu Sheng (whose father Liu Yan had married Ma Xiyin's sister as his empress, and therefore would refer to the Ma brothers as uncles even though he was not born of her), then wrote a letter to Ma Xiyin, claiming that his intent was to aid Ma Xiyin:

King Wumu (i.e., Ma Yin) took over the entire Chu territory and built up a rich, powerful, and peaceful state for 50-some years. It was unfortunate that Uncle 35 [(i.e., Ma Xiguang)] and Uncle 30 [(i.e., Ma Xi'e)] fought with and slaughtered each other, such that they surrendered the ancestral foundation to the enemy to the north. I heard that the Tang forces have already taken over [(Chu's capital)] Changsha, and I have to believe in my heart that Guilin would be their next target. Our empire had long been in alliance with your kingdom, and the relationship was strengthened by marital relations. Now that I see that you are about to fall, so how can I not save you? I have launched an army to head toward you by both water and land, and I will surely let you, Uncle Chancellor, always have a military command and always control territory.

Ma Xiyin considered surrendering to Southern Han, but could not decide immediately. When Wu quickly reached Gui Prefecture, Ma Xiyin and Xu instead abandoned it and fled to Quan Prefecture (全州, in modern Guilin). Wu subsequently captured the rest of Jingjiang for Southern Han.

Ma Xiyin later went to Southern Tang and was settled at Yang Prefecture (揚州, in modern Yangzhou, Jiangsu) with Ma Xichong and the rest of the Ma family. In 956, Southern Tang came under attack by its northern neighbor Later Zhou, and Yang Prefecture fell to the invading Later Zhou forces. Later Zhou's emperor Guo Rong ordered that Ma Xichong (along with Wang Jiyi (王繼沂), the son of Min's last emperor Wang Yanzheng, who was also settled by Southern Tang at Yang) be located and comforted. Subsequently, when Later Zhou forces were forced to abandon Yang, Ma Xichong took 17 brothers and/or cousins to the Later Zhou capital Daliang, including Ma Xiyin. Ma Xiyin was made an army commander under a military governor. That was the last historical reference to Ma Xiyin, and it is not known when he died.

== Notes and references ==
- Spring and Autumn Annals of the Ten Kingdoms, vol. 71.
- Zizhi Tongjian, vol. 290.

Chinese nobility
Preceded by Ma Xi'e	Ruler of China (Northeastern Guangxi) (de facto); 951	Succeeded by Liu Sheng
