= Zhao Guangyin =

Zhao Guangyin (Chinese: 趙光胤; died May 23, 925) was an official during China's Five Dynasties and Ten Kingdoms period. He was the chancellor during Later Tang. He was a son of the Tang dynasty chancellor Zhao Yin and younger brother of the Later Liang chancellor Zhao Guangfeng and Southern Han chancellor Zhao Guangyi. (He is referred to as Zhao Guangyun (趙光允) in some subsequent historical accounts written during the Song dynasty as part of naming taboo for Song's founding emperor Emperor Taizu of Song (Zhao Kuangyin), but because the naming taboo appeared to be largely limited to consecutive uses of the characters "Kuang" and "Yin," other Song dynasty sources refer to him as Guangyin.)

== Background ==
It is not known when or where Zhao Guangyin was born. His father Zhao Yin served as a chancellor during the reigns of Emperor Yizong of Tang and Emperor Yizong's son and successor Emperor Xizong. His two older brothers Zhao Guangfeng and Zhao Guangyi were both known for their literary talents and virtue. Zhao Guangyin himself, like they were, was known for his ability to write poems, and he passed the imperial examinations in the Jinshi class in 891, during the reign of Emperor Xizong's brother and successor Emperor Zhaozong. He subsequently served in the Tang imperial government, reaching the post of Jiabu Langzhong (駕部郎中), a supervisory official at the ministry of rites (禮部, Libu).

== During Later Liang ==
During the time of Tang's successor state Later Liang, Zhao Guangfeng served as a chancellor for some time. Zhao Guangyin himself was said to have served in some (unspecified) high positions. It was said that he was considered righteous and elegant in his behavior, such that his reputation drew respect even in the territory of Later Liang's archrival to the north, Jin.

== During Later Tang ==
In 923, Later Liang was conquered by Jin's successor state Later Tang, whose emperor Li Cunxu took over Later Liang territory. Shortly after, his officials opined that he needed additional chancellors who were familiar with the regulations of the Tang dynasty, which Later Tang viewed itself as the legitimate successor to—at that time, the only chancellors were Doulu Ge and Guo Chongtao (and Guo also served as his chief of staff). While the popular opinions at that time were that both Xue Tinggui (薛廷珪) and Li Qi were learned and appropriate candidates, Guo opined that Xue was frivolous and lacking the appropriate disposition for a chancellor, while Li Qi was prone to risky behavior. He, citing Zhao Guangyin's reputation even in Jin, recommended Zhao, while Doulu recommended Wei Yue. Shortly after, Li Cunxu gave both Zhao and Wei the designation of Tong Zhongshu Menxia Pingzhangshi (同中書門下平章事), making them chancellors, and both were also given the title of Zhongshu Shilang (中書侍郎), deputy head of the legislative bureau of government (中書省, Zhongshu Sheng).

Zhao Guangyin was described to be himself also frivolous and self-important, however, compared to the more serious disposition of his brother Zhao Guangfeng. It was said that at that time, Zhao Guangfeng was not often hosting guests, but whenever Zhao Guangyin visited him, Zhao Guangyin would try to engage him in talks about politics. Zhao Guangfeng eventually put up a sign on his door, "Please do not discuss the matters of the Office of Chancellors." However, it was said that because Doulu, while from a Tang aristocratic family, never served in a Tang imperial administration, Zhao Guangyin became the key decision-maker in terms of creating regulations and rites for the new dynasty, based on Tang traditions.

However, Zhao Guangyin eventually became apprehensive about his own position over a dispute with a favorite eunuch of Li Cunxu's, Yang Xilang (楊希朗). What happened was that Yang was an adoptive grandnephew of the powerful late Tang eunuch Yang Fugong, and requested that Yang Fugong's properties be returned to him. When Yang Xilang's petition was given to the Office of Chancellors for discussion, Zhao stated to Guo that Yang Fugong had been involved in a rebellion and had never had his reputation restored by Tang, such that it would be inappropriate for his property to be returned. Guo, who wanted to control the power of the eunuchs, informed Li Cunxu of this. Li Cunxu told Yang to go make his case himself with Zhao. When Yang met Zhao, Yang argued forcefully that another granduncle of his, Yang Fuguang, had great accomplishments, and that Yang Fugong's alleged crimes were the result of the machinations of the chancellor Zhang Jun, such that Yang Fugong's reputation was effectively restored subsequently — pointing out that if that did not occur, it would not have been possible for Yang himself and his adoptive cousins to be serving as eunuch monitors. As Yang became harsh and angry in tone during the argument, Zhao became displeased at the implication that Zhao himself was unfamiliar with late-Tang events, and Zhao also became apprehensive that Yang might act against him, as a close associate of the emperor. It was said that he became so worried that he became ill. He died in summer 925, while still serving as chancellor. He was given posthumous honors.

== Notes and references ==
- Old Book of Tang, vol. 178.
- Old History of the Five Dynasties, vol. 58.
- Zizhi Tongjian, vols. 272, 273.
