= Pi Rixiu =

Tang dynasty poet

- 皮日休
- Born: c. 834; Jingling, Xiangyang (now Tianmen, Hubei)
- Died: 883 (aged 48–49)
- Occupation: Poet
- Children: Pi Guangye (皮光業); Pi Guanglin (皮光邻); Another son

Chinese name
- Chinese: 皮日休
- Hanyu Pinyin: Pí Rìxiū
Transcriptions
Standard Mandarin
- Hanyu Pinyin: Pí Rìxiū
- Wade–Giles: P'i Jih-hsiu

Pi Rixiu (Chinese: 皮日休; pinyin: Pí Rìxiū; Wade–Giles: P'i Jih-hsiu; ca. 834 – 883) was a Tang dynasty poet. His courtesy names were Yishao (逸少) and Ximei (袭美), and he wrote under the pen name Lumenzi (鹿门子). Pi was a contemporary of poet Lu Guimeng; these two poets are often referred to as Pi-Lu.

Pi was born at Jingling, Xiangyang (present-day Tianmen, Hubei Province). He is thought to have been of humble birth. He spent his youth traveling and writing: his verse was well known by the time he sat for the civil service examination, obtaining a degree of Jinshi in 867. He travelled to Suzhou in 868, where he became acquainted with Lu Guimeng. The subsequent correspondence of poems between the two would be collected by Pi in his Songling Ji (松陵集), one of his major works along with the Pizi Wensou (皮子文薮), whose matched rhyme poetry would later influence the poets of the Song Dynasty. Later, he was involved in the rebellion of Huang Chao. (Note: Older scholarship (from the Yuan and Ming dynasties) held that his appointment as Hanlin Academician by Huang had been forced, and that he was "trapped among the rebels". Today, the consensus among modern scholars is that he did collaborate with Huang.) He might have been killed by the latter, by the Tang after they defeated Huang Chao, or have died in exile.

Pi Rixiu's style, both of poems and prose, is described as both idiosyncratic and simple, with many of his works lamenting the sufferings of the common people.

== Biography ==
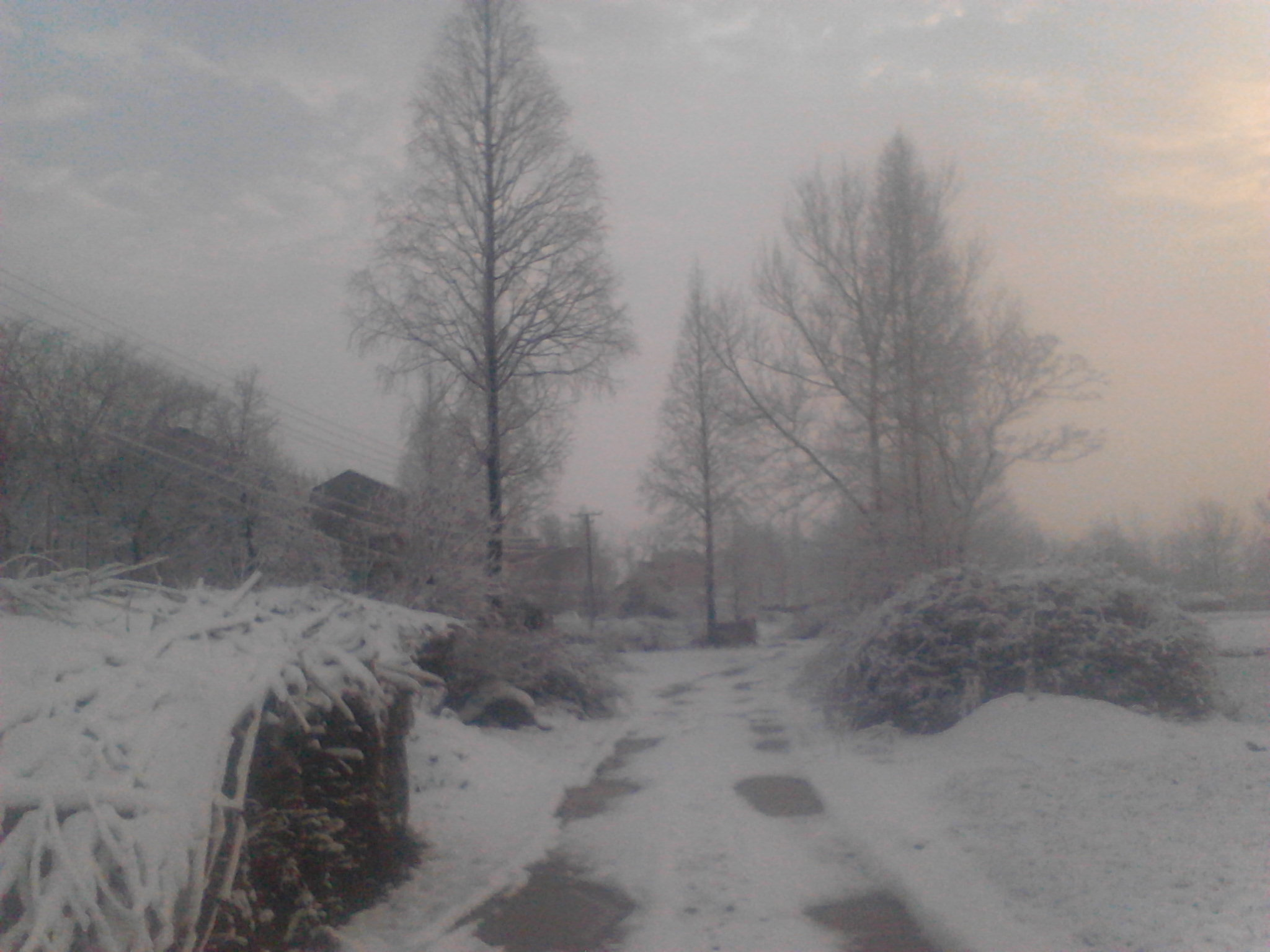
Woods around Tianmen, Hubei, Pi Rixiu's hometown.

Born into poverty, in 866 he failed his first attempt at the Jinshi examination. He was able to pass the examination at the bottom of the list next year, thus becoming a Jinshi in the eighth year of Xiantong (867). In the tenth year of Xiantong (869) he went to Suzhou on official business together with government officer Jian Qinghe, where he served as a low-ranking assistant to the local prefect. It was during the time spent there that he met Lu Guimeng, with whom he would correspond the poems that would later go on to make up the Songling Ji (松陵集), one of Pi Rixiu's major works. Later, he served as Taichang Boshi (太常博士), a scholar at the ministry of worship. He then lived in Lumen Mountain, the same mountain in which Meng Haoran had lived. Of Meng Haorang he once said that only the latter could be placed next to Li Bai and Du Fu and not be embarrassed. Pi called himself Lumenzi and also Xianqi Buyi and Zuiyin Xiansheng. He was said to be unassuming in appearance, arrogant in nature, witty and humorous. His poetry was said to be as famous as Lu Guimeng's. Discussing his short essays, Lu Xun claimed that Pi Rixiu was "a shining spearhead in the muddy swamp of the late Tang Dynasty". In the fifth year of Qianfu of Emperor Xizong of Tang (878), Huang Chao's army came down to Jiangzhe and Pi Rixiu joined him. In the first year of Guangming of Emperor Xizong of Tang (880), Huang Chao captured Chang'an and proclaimed himself emperor. The new state was named Great Qi (Daqi, 大齊). Pi Rixiu thereupon served as a Hanlin Academician under the peasant regime. He is also said to have visited Tongguan County in the third year of the Zhonghe era (883).

=== Marriage and family ===
Pi Rixiu was married with Lady Teng (氏), who was the younger sister of Teng Wengui (滕文规), the magistrate of Shanyin. They married in the eleventh year of the Xiantong era (870). Given that Pi Rixiu was already over thirty years old at the time and had a son, born in 860, whose fate is unknown, Lady Teng may not have been Pi Rixiu's first wife. Pi Rixiu's other sons, born by Lady Teng after their marriage, were Pi Guangye, an official of the Five Dynasties and Ten Kingdoms Period state of Wuyue, who served as chancellor under Qian Yuanguan, and Pi Guanglin, who was appointed prefect (刺史) of Wenzhou, likewise in the Wuyue Kingdom.

=== Involvement with Huang Chao ===
Scholar Yan Yan (嚴衍) believed that Pi Rixiu did not participate in Huang Chao's rebellion. However, neither the New Book of Tang nor the Old Book of Tang include a biography of him (a clue to his participation in Huang Chao's rebellion). The Zizhi Tongjian records that he had joined Huang Chao, but Yan Yan believed that this was a misrepresentation, since, according to Yan Yan, many elements are missing from the Zizhi Tongjian. He and his students postulated that after he usurped the throne, Huang Chao wanted to "taint court officials with false official titles". When they were summoned to take up their official posts, none came. Huang then had conducted a large-scale search of the villages, and even used their refusal as an excuse to kill those who fled and refused to take up their posts. Thus, Yan Yan speculated that Pi Rixiu's appointment was most likely nothing but a forged edict by Huang Chao. Although there is still some uncertainty, the present consensus among modern scholars is that Pi Rixiu did collaborate with Huang Chao in the latter's rebellion.

=== Cause of death and whereabouts ===
There are several different theories about the cause of Pi Rixiu's death. Some say he was killed by Huang Chao himself, probably because the rebel felt some of Pi's poems were satirical, while others say he was killed by the Tang after Huang Chao's defeat. Some say he sought refuge with Qian Liu of Wuyue, while others still claim he lived in exile in Suzhou until his death.

== Works ==
He authored the 10-volume Pizi Wensou (皮子文薮), a collection of his early works, mainly prose writing, which he compiled himself, completing the work in the seventh year of the Xiantong era of Emperor Yizong of Tang (866).

A Ming Dynasty edition of this work in the Sibu Congkan (四部叢刊) and an edition edited by Xiao Difeng published by Zhonghua Book Company are widely circulated. The Quantangwen (全唐文) includes four volumes of Pi Rixiu's writings, including seven prose pieces not present in the Wensou. Another of his major works is the 10-piece series of Zheng Yuefu (正樂府). In it, Pi criticizes the abuses of his time. This set of didactic poems in a simple style was inspired by Bai Juyi and Yuan Zhen's Xin Yuefu (新樂府), or New Yuefu. In the Zheng Yuefu Pi criticizes the forced labor imposed on the people of Lung and, more generally, the abuses imposed on the common people throughout the empire to meet the demand of the court for luxury products. He also authored the 10-volume Songling Ji (松陵集), which contains the poetry correspondence between himself and Lu Guimeng. This work is best known for the style of matching each other's rhymes, with Pi or Lu writing a poem with a certain style and rhyme scheme and the other replying with a different poem, but matching the style and with the same rhymes. Matching works by Pi and Li and by Yuan Zhen and Bai Juyi were regarded as the model for their own matched rhyme poetry by the poets of the Song Dynasty, in which matched rhyme poetry became quite popular and was picked by, among others, Su Shi. Indeed, matched rhyme poetry accounts for about one sixth of the poetical output of Su Shi, Huang Tingjian, and Su Zhe. The correspondence between the two poets, who, though having only a brief meeting in person, went on to have a copious correspondence and inspire each other's poetry, features also quotations of more than 200 historically prominent figures, and a preface in which Pi outlines his vision of the evolution of poetry since antiquity. Pi Rixiu's poems are included in the Complete Tang Poems, wherein he totals over 300 poems in 9 volumes. The poems of 8 out of 9 of these volumes are not included in the Wensou.

In 1981, Shanghai Ancient Books Publishing House (上海古籍出版社) published a revised and punctuated edition of the Wensou by Xiao Difeng and Zheng Qingdu, to which were appended poems and prose writing by Pi Rixiu other than those in his self-compiled Wensou.

Records of Pi Rixiu's life and deeds and other biographical material can be found in Sun Guangxian's Bei Meng Suo Yan (北梦琐言), Qian Yi's Nanbu Xinshu (南部新書), Yin Zhu's Dalisi Cheng Pi Ziliang Muzhi Ming or Epitaph for Pi Ziliang, Vice Minister of the Dalisi (大理寺丞皮子良墓志铭), Tao Yue's Wudai Shi Bu or Supplement to the History of the Five Dynasties (五代史补), Chen Zhensun's Zhi Zhai Shulu Jieti (直斋书录解题), Ji Yougong's Tangshi Jishi or Chronicle of Tang Poetry (唐诗纪事), and Xin Wenfang's Tang Caizi Chuan or Biographies of Tang Talented Scholars (唐才子传), among other works.
