= Zhao Guangfeng =

Zhao Guangfeng (趙光逢) (died January 20, 928?), courtesy name Yanji (延吉), formally the Duke of Qi (齊公), was an official in the late Chinese dynasty Tang dynasty and the succeeding Later Liang of the Five Dynasties and Ten Kingdoms period, serving as a chancellor during Later Liang.

== During the Tang dynasty ==
It is not known when Zhao Guangfeng was born. His father Zhao Yin served as a chancellor during the reigns of Emperor Yizong of Tang and Emperor Yizong's son Emperor Xizong. Both Zhao Guangfeng and his younger brother Zhao Guangyi were known in their youth for their literary abilities and virtues, and Zhao Guangfeng was particularly praised for the propriety of his actions, becoming nicknamed "Jade Ruler" (玉界尺).

Zhao Guangfeng passed the imperial examinations in the Jinshi class in 878 and was made a secretary of the Fengxiang Municipality (鳳翔, in modern Baoji, Shaanxi) government, before he was recalled to the imperial government to serve as an imperial censor with the title Jiancha Yushi (監察御史). After his father Zhao Yin died in 881, he left governmental service for some time to observe a mourning period for his father. After Emperor Xizong, who had fled the imperial capital Chang'an due to the major agrarian rebellion led by Huang Chao, was able to return to Chang'an in 885, Emperor Xizong made him a Taichang Boshi (太常博士), a scholar at the ministry of worship (太常寺, Taichang Si). He subsequently successively served as Lǐbu Yuanwailang (禮部員外郎), a low-level official at the ministry of rites (禮部, Lǐbu); Sixun Yuanwailang (司勛員外郎), a low-level official at the ministry of civil service affairs (吏部, Lìbu, note different tone); and Lìbu Yuanwailang (吏部員外郎), also a low-level official at the ministry of civil service affairs, as well as a scholar at Jixian Hall (集賢殿). He was later promoted to be Lǐbu Langzhong (禮部郎中), a supervisory official at the ministry of rites.

In the middle of Jinfu era (892-893) of Emperor Xizong's brother and successor Emperor Zhaozong, Zhao was made Cibu Langzhong (祠部郎中), still a supervisory official at the ministry of rites, but also given the responsibility of drafting imperial edicts. He was soon made an imperial scholar (翰林學士, Hanlin Xueshi) and Zhongshu Sheren (中書舍人), a mid-level official at the legislative bureau of government (中書省, Zhongshu Sheng). He was later made deputy minister of census (戶部侍郎) and chief imperial scholar (翰林學士承旨, Hanlin Xueshi Chengzhi). He was later promoted to be Shangshu Zuocheng (尚書左丞), one of the secretaries general of the executive bureau (尚書省, Shangshu Sheng), while remaining chief imperial scholar as well.

When Emperor Zhaozong fled Chang'an in fear of attacks by the warlords Wang Xingyu the military governor of Jingnan Circuit (靜難, headquartered in modern Xianyang, Shaanxi) and Li Maozhen the military governor of Fengxiang Circuit (headquartered at Fengxiang Municipality) in 895, Zhao did not follow the emperor, despite the emperor sending the eunuch Dai Zhiquan (戴知權) to summon him, and he subsequently claimed to be ill and retired. Later, after Emperor Zhaozong fled to Hua Prefecture (華州, in modern Weinan, Shaanxi) in 896, Zhao accompanied the emperor there and was made the deputy chief imperial censor (御史中丞). At that time, two of the emperor's favorites were the Taoist monk Xu Yanshi (許巖士) and the astronomer Ma Daoyin (馬道殷); as a result, many people were trying to use sorcery to gain audience at the court. Zhao carried out the law and put many of them to death, and it was said that his actions stopped the trend. He was subsequently made the deputy minister of rites (禮部侍郎) and put in charge of the imperial examinations.

After Emperor Zhaozong returned to Chang'an in 898, there was an incident in 900 when the powerful eunuch Liu Jishu deposed the emperor and briefly replaced him with his son Li Yu, Prince of De the Crown Prince, before a countercoup restored Emperor Zhaozong to the throne. Still, the episode portended further struggles between eunuchs and imperial officials, led by the chancellor Cui Yin. Zhao did not want to be involved, so he claimed to be ill and retired to the eastern capital Luoyang, refusing to meet any guests for several years.

After Emperor Zhaozong was forcibly moved by the powerful warlord Zhu Quanzhong the military governor of Xuanwu Circuit (宣武, headquartered in modern Kaifeng, Henan) in 904, one of the chancellors installed by Zhu was Liu Can, whose passage of the imperial examinations had been under Zhao's auspices and who therefore felt indebted to Zhao. He subsequently brought Zhao back to the imperial government as deputy minister of civil service affairs, Shangshu Zuocheng, and minister of worship (太常卿, Taichang Qing). In 907, when Zhu forced Emperor Zhaozong's son and successor Emperor Ai to yield the throne to him (ending Tang and starting a new Later Liang with Zhu as its Emperor Taizu), Zhao participated in the transition ceremony, assisting the chief imperial censor Xue Yiju in bearing the main imperial seal and presenting it to Zhu.

== During Later Liang ==
In 908, Emperor Taizu sent Zhao Guangfeng's brother Zhao Guangyi and another official, Li Yinheng, to formally commission his vassal Liu Yin, who then controlled Qinghai Circuit (清海, headquartered in modern Guangzhou, Guangdong) as the military governor of Qinghai and Jinghai (靜海, headquartered in modern Hanoi, Vietnam) Circuits. Liu kept Zhao Guangyi and Li and refused to let them return. (When Liu's brother and successor Liu Yan would eventually declare himself emperor of a new state of Southern Han in 917, he would make both Zhao Guangyi and Li chancellors.)

In 909, Emperor Taizu removed the chancellors Han Jian and Yang She from their chancellor posts; Zhao Guangfeng, who was then serving still as the minister of worship, and Du Xiao, were made chancellors in their stead with the designation Tong Zhongshu Menxia Pingzhangshi (同中書門下平章事). In 915, by which time Emperor Taizu's son Zhu Zhen was emperor, Zhao Guangfeng, who was then carrying the titles of You Pushe (右僕射, one of the heads of the executive bureau) and Menxia Shilang (門下侍郎, deputy head of the examination bureau (門下省, Menxia Sheng)), retired, and was given the honorary title of Taizi Taibao (太子太保). In 916, he was again made chancellor and Menxia Shilang, and was additionally given the title of Sikong (司空, one of the Three Excellencies). He retired again in 918 and was given the title of Situ (司徒, also one of the Three Excellencies). It was said that after this retirement, he did not receive guests at his mansion.

== During Later Tang ==
In 923, Later Liang was conquered by its northern rival Later Tang. Later Tang's Emperor Zhuangzong subsequently made another brother of Zhao Guangfeng's, Zhao Guangyin, chancellor. It was said that when Zhao Guangyin visited Zhao Guangfeng, he would often try to discuss the political matters of the day with Zhao Guangfeng. One day, Zhao Guangfeng posted a sign on his door, "Please do not speak of the matters of the Office of the Chancellors." Subsequently, early during the Tiancheng era (926-929) of Emperor Zhuangzong's adoptive brother and successor Emperor Mingzong, Zhao Guangfeng was given the honorary title of Taibao (太保) and created the Duke of Qi. He later died at Luoyang and was given posthumous honors.

== Notes and references ==
- Old Book of Tang, vol. 178.
- History of the Five Dynasties, vol. 58.
- New History of the Five Dynasties, vol. 35.
- Zizhi Tongjian, vols. 266, 267, 269, 270, 272.
