= Zhao Yin =

Chinese Tang dynasty official (died 881)

Zhao Yin (Chinese: 趙隱, died 881), courtesy name Dayin (大隱), formally the Count of Tianshui (天水伯), was an official of the Chinese Tang dynasty, serving as a chancellor during the reigns of Emperor Yizong and Emperor Yizong's son Emperor Xizong.

== Background and early career ==
It is not known when Zhao Yin was born. His family was from Fengtian (奉天, in modern Xianyang, Shaanxi), a town that belonged to Jingzhao Municipality (京兆, i.e., the region of the Tang dynasty capital Chang'an). Several of his male-line ancestors served as county magistrates during Tang. When Emperor Dezong was forced to flee to Fengtian in 783 after soldiers mutinied against him at Chang'an and supported the general Zhu Ci as their ruler instead, Zhu put Fengtian under siege, and Zhao Yin's grandfather Zhao Zhi (趙植) led his household servants and guests in assisting Fengtian's defense. As a result, after Zhu's rebellion was suppressed, Zhao Zhi entered the imperial government and eventually served as the military governor (Jiedushi) of Lingnan Circuit (嶺南, headquartered in modern Guangzhou, Guangdong) until his death. Zhao Yin's father Zhao Cunyue (趙存約) served on the staff of the former chancellor Li Jiang when Li served as the military governor of Shannan West Circuit (山南西道, headquartered in modern Hanzhong, Shaanxi), and when the soldiers mutinied against Li in 830, Zhao Cunyue tried to assist Li in fighting off the mutineers, but was killed by the mutineers with Li. Zhao Yin had at least one younger brother, Zhao Zhi (趙騭).

Zhao Yin, who was said to be filially pious, was greatly saddened by his father's death, and he spent more than a decade thereafter studying near his father's tomb, not submitting himself for the imperial examinations. During this time, the household was said to be poor, and he and Zhao Zhi, who had a loving brotherly relationship, farmed to support their mother. During the Huichang era (841-847) of Emperor Dezong's great-great-grandson Emperor Wuzong, some friends of Zhao Cunyue's became powerful officials, and they urged Zhao Yin to enter official service; only then did Zhao Yin do so, and he served as an assistant to various officials. In 849, by which time Emperor Wuzong's uncle Emperor Xuānzong was emperor, Zhao passed the imperial examinations in the Jinshi class. (His brother Zhao Zhi would do so eventually as well.) He served at various posts as prefectural prefect, supervisory official, imperial attendant, and eventually the administrator of Henan Municipality (河南, i.e., the region of the Tang eastern capital Luoyang). He would later serve as deputy minister of census (戶部侍郎, Hubu Shilang) and then the deputy minister of defense (兵部侍郎, Bingbu Shilang), also serving as the director of the salt and iron monopolies.

== Chancellorship ==
In 872, by which time Zhao Yin was referred to as deputy minister of justice (刑部侍郎, Xingbu Shilang) and director of taxation, then-reigning Emperor Yizong (Emperor Xuānzong's son) gave him the designation Tong Zhongshu Menxia Pingzhangshi (同中書門下平章事), making him a chancellor de facto, as well as deputy minister of census. He was later made Zhongshu Shilang (中書侍郎), the deputy head of the legislative bureau of government (中書省, Zhongshu Sheng), as well as the minister of rites (禮部尚書, Libu Shangshu), with the additional honorific title of Tejin (特進); he was also created the Count of Tianshui.

It was said that Zhao Yin was humble despite his high position, and after imperial gatherings, when he and Zhao Zhi would return home, they would change into civilian clothing and attend to their mother as if they were ordinary citizens. One birthday of Emperor Yizong's, when Emperor Yizong held a feast at Ci'en Temple (慈恩寺), Zhao Yin accompanied his mother to the feast, and after the chancellors led the imperial officials in bowing to the emperor, he returned to his mother's side to attend to her, an action that the other officials found to be a demonstration of filial piety. (Eventually, this would become precedent for the future chancellors Cui Yanzhao and Zhang Jun, whose mothers were also alive at the time that they would be chancellors, at imperial feasts.)

Emperor Yizong died in 873 and was succeeded by his young son Emperor Xizong. In 874, Zhao Yin was relieved of his chancellor position and sent out of Chang'an to serve as the military governor of Zhenhai Circuit (鎮海, headquartered in modern Zhenjiang, Jiangsu), still carrying the Tong Zhongshu Menxia Pingzhangshi title as an honorific title.

== After chancellorship ==
In 875, after some 69 officers of Zhenhai Circuit had battlefield accomplishments, Zhao Yin gave them honorific titles, but no increases in food or clothing stipends. This displeased them, who appealed the lack of increase, but their appeals were denied. They, thereafter, under the leadership of Wang Ying, rebelled and pillaged the region. As a result of what was considered mishandling of the situation by Zhao, he was relieved from his post and given the largely ceremonial post of minister of worship (太常卿, Taichang Qing). Later, early in the Guangming era (880-881), he was served as minister of civil service affairs (吏部尚書, Libu Shangshu). He died in 881 and was given posthumous honors by Emperor Xizong. (As, by that time, Emperor Xizong had fled Chang'an and was en route to Chengdu due to the attack by the agrarian rebel Huang Chao, who established his own state of Qi as its emperor, it appeared likely that Zhao had fled the capital with Emperor Xizong and died on the way.) His sons Zhao Guangfeng, Zhao Guangyi, and Zhao Guangyin would all eventually serve in the imperial government in the final years of Tang dynasty and in the succeeding Later Liang, with Zhao Guangfeng serving as a chancellor for Later Liang; Zhao Guangyi would eventually serve as a chancellor for the secessionist state of Southern Han, while Zhao Guangyin would serve as a chancellor during the succeeding Later Tang.

== Notes and references ==
- Old Book of Tang, vol. 178.
- New Book of Tang, vol. 182.
- Zizhi Tongjian, vol. 252.
