= Wang Ying (Tang dynasty) =

Wang Ying (王郢) (died 877) was a rebel military officer of the Chinese Tang dynasty who, from 875 to 877, roamed and pillaged the modern Zhejiang and Fujian region.

== Genesis of Wang Ying's rebellion ==
Wang Ying's date of birth and origin are unknown. As of 875, he was serving as the defender of Langshan (狼山, in modern Nantong, Jiangsu), serving under Zhao Yin the military governor (jiedushi) of Zhenhai Circuit (鎮海, headquartered in modern Zhenjiang, Jiangsu). That year, he and 68 other officers had accomplishments in battle, but Zhao refused to give them material rewards, rewarding them only with titles. When Wang and the others sought material rewards with no success, they mutinied with Wang as their leader, seizing weapons from the armory and then pillaging the nearby areas, quickly expanding their army to almost 10,000 in size. Wang's army captured Su (蘇州, in modern Suzhou, Jiangsu) and Chang (常州, in modern Changzhou, Jiangsu) Prefectures, and further established a fleet that allowed them to go up and down the Yangtze River and the East China Sea coast without obstruction. They thus were able to easily pillage the regions of Zhenhai, Zhedong (浙東, headquartered in modern Shaoxing, Zhejiang), and Fujian (福建, headquartered in modern Fuzhou, Fujian).

== Wang's campaigns ==
In 876, then-reigning Emperor Xizong commissioned the general Gao Jie (高傑) to lead a fleet against Wang Ying, but there was no indication that Gao had any real success against Wang. However, Wang soon tried to negotiate with Lu Shi (魯寔) the prefect of Wen Prefecture (溫州, in modern Wenzhou, Zhejiang), seeking resubmission to and recommission from the imperial government. Lu supported Wang's suggestion, and the imperial government initially accepted. However, it ordered that Wang give up his army and go to the imperial capital Chang'an to pay homage to the emperor, before he could be given a commission. Wang did not immediately turn down the proposal but tried to delay his departure for half a year. He then requested to be the defender of Wanghai (望海, in modern Ningbo, Zhejiang). The imperial government refused the request, and instead commissioned him as an officer of the imperial guards, and further stated that Wang would be allowed to keep all the treasures that he had pillaged.

In spring 877, Wang decided to turn on Lu. He enticed Lu to come onto his ship and seized Lu, and Lu's soldiers fled. Upon hearing that Lu had been captured, the imperial government commissioned the general Song Hao (宋皓) to be the commander of some 15,000 men against Wang. Meanwhile, though, Wang captured Wanghai, and then pillaged Ming (明州, in modern Ningbo) and Tai (台州, in modern Taizhou, Zhejiang) Prefectures. He captured Tai Prefecture, forcing the prefect of Tai, Wang Bao (王葆), to withdraw to Tangxing (唐興, in modern Taizhou). In reaction, Emperor Xizong further ordered Zhenhai, Zhedong, and Fujian Circuits to contribute ships in the operations against Wang.

== Death ==
However, as Wang Ying returned to Zhenhai to pillage it, the new military governor Pei Qu (裴璩) gathered his forces and initially refused to engage Wang. Instead, Pei enticed Wang's subordinate Zhu Shi (朱實) to surrender and had Zhu made a general of the imperial guards. Zhu surrendered with some 6,000 to 7,000 men, causing Wang's forces to begin to disperse. Wang took his remaining forces and returned to Ming Prefecture. As he did, Liu Jurong (劉巨容) the defender of Yongqiao (甬橋, in modern Suzhou, Anhui) used compact arrows — fired from a bamboo trunk — to shoot Wang to death, ending his rebellion.
