= Yang Dongqian =

Yang Dongqian (Chinese: 楊洞潛) (died 935), courtesy name Zhaoxuan (昭玄), was an official of the Southern Han dynasty of China, serving as a chancellor.

== Background ==
It is not known when Yang Dongqian was born. His ancestors had been Tang officials, with his great-great-grandfather Yang Hui (楊回) serving as the governor of Suining Commandery (遂寧, in modern Suining, Sichuan)—and thus being datable to the reign of Emperor Xuanzong of Tang, during whose reign, for some time, Tang prefectures were known as commanderies (from 742 to 757). Yang Dongqian's great-grandfather (Yang Hui's son) Yang Mian (楊勉) moved from there south of the Nanling Mountains, to Shixing, and made his home there. Neither Yang Dongqian's grandfather Yang Chui (楊垂) and father Yang Zhen (楊軫) were recorded to be in official service, but both were said to be honest and virtuous.

Yang Dongqian himself was said to be studious in his youth, open-minded, and understanding of principles of governance. At one point, he became a surveillance officer for Yong District (邕管, headquartered in modern Nanning, Guangxi), then still under Tang dynasty rule. After the end of his term of service, he went to live in Guang Prefecture (廣州, in modern Guangzhou, Guangdong).

== Service under Liu Yin and Liu Yan prior to Southern Han's founding ==
At one point, Yang Dongqian was retained to serve on the staff of the warlord Liu Yin, who then controlled the region as the military governor (jiedushi) of Qinghai Circuit (清海, headquartered at Guang Prefecture). Liu Yin honored Yang Dongqian as a teacher for himself, and also had Yang serve as his secretary in his role as military governor of Qinghai and Jianwu (建武, converted from Yong District) Circuits. He was said to be Liu Yin's chief strategist in planning the seizure of Ningyuan Circuit (寧遠, headquartered in modern Yulin, Guangxi), which eventually happened in 911 (after Liu Yin's death), from Liu Yin's northern neighbor, Ma Yin the Prince of Chu. (Tang's having fallen by that point, both Liu Yin and Ma were nominal vassals of Later Liang.)

In 911, Liu Yin died and was succeeded by his brother Liu Yan. Yang continued to serve Liu Yan, and he suggested to Liu Yan that he should not commission army officers as prefectural prefects. Rather, Yang advocated that he select refugees from the Central Plains who were well-learned, first putting them on his staff to test them and then make them prefects, so that they could govern the prefectures well and benefit the people. Liu Yan agreed.

Also in 911, Lu Yanchang, the warlord who controlled the Qian Prefecture (虔州, in modern Ganzhou, Jiangxi) region, was killed by his officer Li Qiu, who subsequently died and was succeeded by his officer Li Yantu. At Yang's suggestion, Liu Yan attacked Shao Prefecture (韶州, in modern Shaoguan, Guangdong), which was then under control of Li. Liu's army defeated the garrison there, and Shao's prefect Liao Shuang (廖爽) fled to Chu, allowing Liu to take over Shao. Yang subsequently also provided strategic opinions that helped Liu to repel the attempts by Ma to retake Ningyuan, allowing Liu to retain the lands of the original five districts originally belonging to Qinghai's predecessor circuit Lingnan Circuit (嶺南). For Yang's contributions, Liu made him the deputy military governor.

After Later Liang's Emperor Taizu sent the emissary Wei Jian (韋戩) to try to intercede in the conflict between his two vassals Liu and Ma in 912, Yang advocated entering into a marital alliance with Ma in order to settle the two realms' differences. Liu agreed, and in 913 asked Ma for permission to marry one of his daughters. Ma agreed. (The marriage was eventually carried out in 915.)

== During Liu Yan's reign ==
In 917, Liu Yan declared himself emperor of a new state of Yue (later changed to Han, and therefore historically known as Southern Han) as its Emperor Gaozu. He was about to name Yang Dongqian a chancellor with the designation Tong Zhongshu Menxia Pingzhangshi (同中書門下平章事) and minister of defense (兵部尚書, Bingbu Shangshu), but Yang, believing that he should not be honored above another chancellor candidate, Zhao Guangyi, who had been a Later Liang emissary and whose brother Zhao Guangfeng was a chancellor to Later Liang, offered to be subordinate to Zhao. Liu agreed, and while he named Zhao, Yang, and another Later Liang emissary, Li Yinheng, all as chancellors, Zhao received the greater secondary office of minister of defense, while Yang was given the secondary office of deputy minister of defense (兵部侍郎, Bingbu Shilang).

In 920, Yang made the proposal to build schools, to generally teach the people about the proper rites, and to restart imperial examinations that had been a major part of the Tang civil service system. Liu agreed.

However, several suggestions that Yang made to Liu fell on deaf years. For example, when Liu built watery prisons to torture prisoners, Yang urged against it, to no avail. Further, around 934, Liu had his oldest son Liu Hongdu the Prince of Qin conscript a group of 1,000 soldiers to serve as his guards, but Liu Hongdu selected many hoodlums who behaved poorly, and became close to them. Yang, finding this situation untenable, went to speak to Liu Yan:

The Prince of Qin is the Empire's foundation and heir. He should be encouraged to be close to upright gentlemen. It is already too much that he is commanding an army, and how can it be that he be close to hoodlums?

However, Liu Yan responded, "This is just for my son to teach them about war. I am sorry this is overly concerning you, Lord." He made no attempts to curb Liu Hongdu's behavior. Once Yang exited the palace, he saw Liu Hongdu's guards robbing gold and silk from merchants, but the merchants did not dare to make reports against them. He lamented and stated, "If the governance has become this troubled, what use is there for a chancellor?" He therefore claimed an illness and returned to his mansion. He was there for quite some time without Liu Yan ever making an attempt to summon him again. He died at home in 935.

== Notes and references ==
- Spring and Autumn Annals of the Ten Kingdoms (十國春秋), vol. 62.
- Book of Southern Han (南漢書), vol. 9.
- Zizhi Tongjian, vols. 270, 271, 279.
