= Shen Song =

Chinese politician

Shen Song (沈崧) (863–938), courtesy name Jifu (吉甫), was a chancellor of the Chinese Five Dynasties and Ten Kingdoms Period state Wuyue.

== Background ==
Shen Song was born in 863, during the reign of Emperor Yizong of Tang. He was said to be from the Min region (i.e., the region of modern Fujian). His grandfather Shen Lu (沈輅) was a judge at Tang's supreme court (大理寺, Dali Si). His father Shen Chao (沈超) served as the magistrate of Changxi County (長溪, in modern Ningde, Fujian), and Shen Song might have been born there.

In 895, during the reign of Emperor Yizong's son Emperor Zhaozong, Shen Song went to then-capital Chang'an to submit himself for the imperial examinations in the Jinshi class. The minister of justice Cui Ning (崔凝) was in charge of the imperial examinations that year, and he chose 25 examinees as having passed the examination, and Shen was one of them. However, for reasons unclear, Emperor Zhaozong then had the imperial scholar Lu Yi and the director of the archival bureau Feng Wo (馮偓) conduct a second-round examination, which eliminated 10 examinees — but Shen survived this round as well.

However, Shen then headed home toward the Min region rather than remain to serve in the imperial examination — perhaps because at that time, the Tang state was overrun with various disturbances. As he went through Huainan Circuit (淮南, headquartered in modern Yangzhou, Jiangsu), the military governor of Huainan (should be referring to Yang Xingmi) invited him to serve on staff, but he declined. He proceeded to Hang Prefecture (杭州, in modern Hangzhou, Zhejiang), which was then under the rule of Qian Liu the military governor of Zhenhai Circuit (鎮海, headquartered at Hang). Qian kept Shen on staff to serve as secretary in his role as military governor of Zhenhai.

== Service under Qian Liu ==
In addition to being Qian Liu's secretary, Shen Song was later also made Qian's deputy in Qian's role as the circuit's agricultural director. It was said that most of Qian's public declarations and communiques with other circuits were written by Shen.

Tang fell in 907 and was, as to the central part of the empire, succeeded by Later Liang, which Qian's realm, which became the state of Wuyue, became a vassal to. In 923, when Li Cunxu, the prince of Later Liang's archival Jin, declared himself emperor of a new state of Later Tang (which Wuyue would become a vassal to after Later Tang destroyed Later Liang later that year), Qian asked for Shen's thoughts about Li's era name Tongguang (同光). Shen responded, "Looking at this era name, the state would not be completed, as it only had one mouth" (referring to that Tong (同) lacked the enclosure of the character for "state" (國) and contained the characters of "one" (一) and "mouth" (口) inside it).

== Service under Qian Yuanguan ==
Qian Liu died in 932, and was succeeded by his son Qian Chuanguan (who then changed his name to Qian Yuanguan). Qian Yuanguan established a Zeneng Institute (擇能院) to select members of the intelligentsia to serve in the Wuyue state government, and he put Shen Song in charge of the institute. In 937 (by which time Later Tang had fallen and Wuyue was a vassal of its successor state Later Jin), Qian Yuanguan took the title of King of Wuyue (a title that his father Qian Liu had been bestowed but which he himself had not used up to this point), and he commissioned Shen, as well as Cao Zhongda and Pi Guangye, chancellors.

Shen Song died in 938 and was given the posthumous name Wenxian (文獻, "civil and wise"). He left a 20-volume collection of his work.

== Notes and references ==
- Spring and Autumn Annals of the Ten Kingdoms, vol. 86.
- Zizhi Tongjian, vols. 277, 281.
