= Pi Guangye =

Chinese statesman (877–943)

Pi Guangye (Chinese: 皮光業; 877 – March 16, 943), courtesy name Wentong (文通), was an official of the Chinese Five Dynasties and Ten Kingdoms Period state Wuyue, serving as a chancellor during the reign of its second king Qian Yuanguan.

== Background ==
Pi Guangye was born in 877, during the reign of Emperor Xizong of Tang. His family was said to have been at Jingling, Xiangyang for generations. His father Pi Rixiu was a prominent late-Tang poet. At one point, Pi Rixiu served as the assistant to the prefect of Su Prefecture (蘇州, in modern Suzhou, Jiangsu) in military matters, and he settled his family there. Pi Guangye was born at Su Prefecture. It was said that when he was nine, he was already capable of writing.

== Service under Qian Liu ==
After Pi Guangye was grown, he went to see Qian Liu, who then ruled the modern Zhejiang region. Qian made Pi a member of his staff, along with Shen Song and Lin Ding. Pi was eventually given the title of assistant to Qian in Qian's role as military governor (Jiedushi) of Zhenhai Circuit (鎮海, headquartered in modern Hangzhou, Zhejiang).

In 916 — by which time Tang had fallen and Qian's domain was known as the state of Wuyue as a vassal of Tang's main successor state Later Liang — Qian wanted to offer tribute to then-Later Liang emperor Zhu Zhen, but the path to the Later Liang capital Daliang was blocked by the territory of the rival state Wu, and initially could not think of an appropriate emissary. He decided to commission Pi to do so, and Pi went through a circumlocutious route, through the territory of several fellow Later Liang vassals — Jian (建州, in modern Nanping, Fujian) and Ting (汀州, in modern Longyan, Fujian) Prefectures (under Min's prince Wang Shenzhi); Qian Prefecture (虔州, in modern Ganzhou, Jiangxi) (under Tan Quanbo); Chen (郴州, in modern Chenzhou, Hunan), Tan (潭州, in modern Changsha, Hunan), and Yue (岳州, in modern Yueyang, Hunan) Prefectures (under Chu's prince Ma Yin); and Jingnan Circuit (荊南, headquartered in modern Jingzhou, Hubei) (under Gao Jichang) — finally reaching Later Liang proper. Zhu was touched by the difficulty journey, and bestowed on Qian the title of generalissimo of all circuits. He also gave Pi the honorary title of Mishu Lang (秘書郎), and also gave him the designation Jinshi Jidi (進士及第) — i.e., someone who had passed the imperial examinations in the Jinshi class, even though Pi did not appear to have ever submitted himself for such examinations.

Not long after this mission, there were peace missions from Wu, and Qian sent Pi on a diplomatic mission to Wu in return. When Pi arrived at Wu, he was given an award of money, but was forbidden by the Wu government of actually carrying the money back to Wuyue and was told that he could spend the money to buy goods to take back to Wuyue. Pi responded, "I am a diplomat. I am not a merchant." He thus left the money at the diplomatic station and left, and the Wu officials had to chase him down. Upon return, he was soon given the title of governor (觀察使, Guanchashi) of Zhexi (i.e., Zhenhai) and Zhedong (浙東, i.e., Wuyue's other main circuit Zhendong (鎮東, headquartered in modern Shaoxing, Zhejiang)).

== Service under Qian Yuanguan and Qian Hongzuo ==
Qian Liu died in 932 and was succeeded as the ruler of Wuyue by his son Qian Chuanguan (who then changed his name to Qian Yuanguan), who, at that time, did not assume the title of king that Qian Liu had used. Qian Yuanguan put Pi Guangye in charge of Zhendong Circuit. In 937, when Qian Yuanguan reclaimed the title of king, he commissioned Pi, as well as Cao Zhongda and Shen Song, chancellors. Pi became responsible for drafting much of the law and the ceremonial regulations of the state.

As chancellor, Pi was said to have paid much attention to his appearance and was capable of speaking, such that those who spoke to him considered him god-like in speech and disposition. He was a tea aficionado, and often wrote poems, referring to tea as "the bitter-mouthed teacher." Many in the state followed his example.

Pi appeared to continue to serve as chancellor after Qian Yuanguan died in 941 and was succeeded by his son Qian Hongzuo, for there was no indication that he was removed from office. He died in 943 and was given the posthumous name Zhenjing (貞敬, "honest and alert"). He left a 13-volume work about the sights that he had seen.

== Notes and references ==
- Spring and Autumn Annals of the Ten Kingdoms, vol. 86.
- Zizhi Tongjian, vols. 269, 281.
