= Liu Hongchang =

Southern Han Official

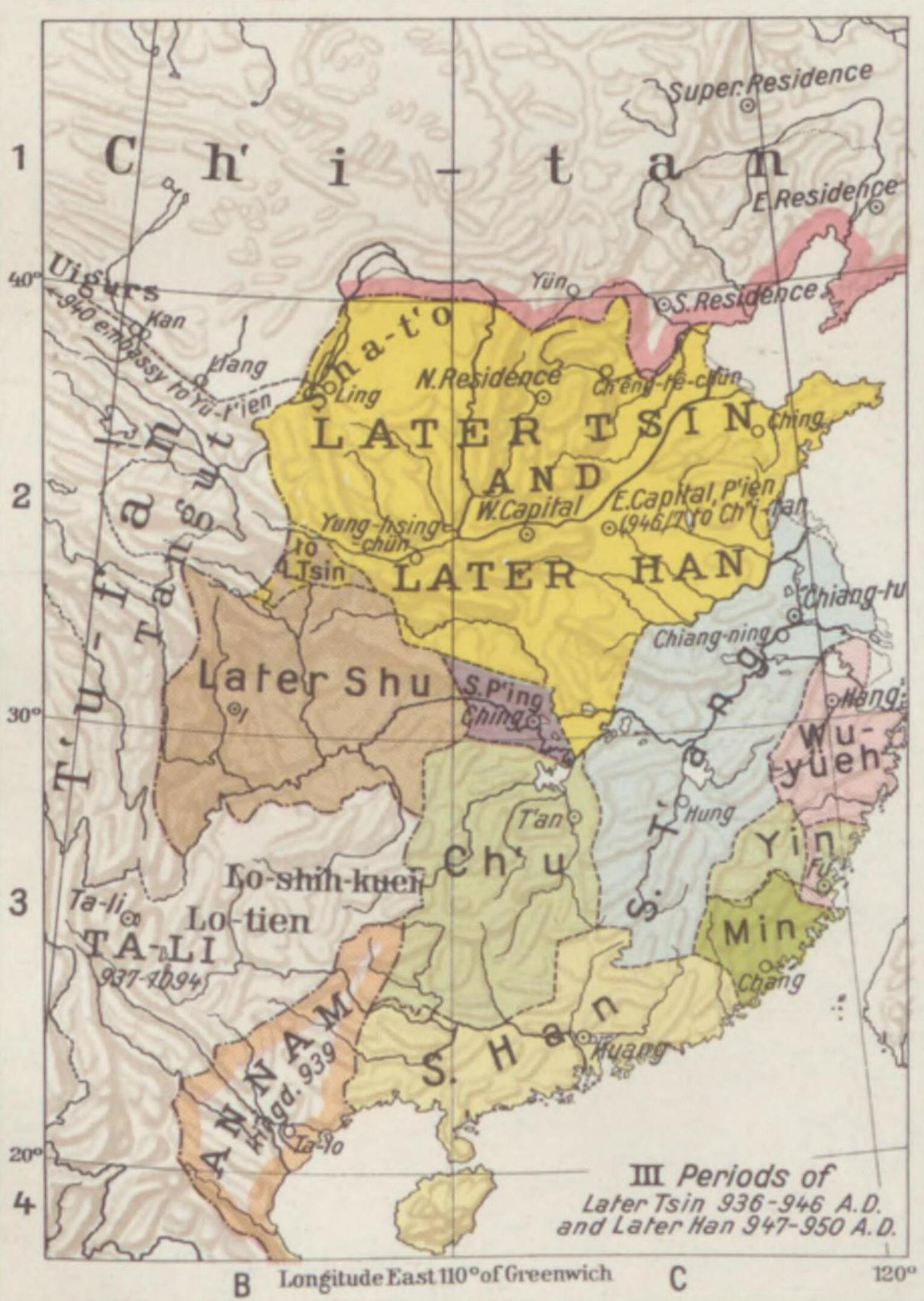
Map of the Five Dynasties and Ten Kingdoms period

Liu Hongchang (劉弘昌) (died 944), formally the Prince of Yue (越王), was an imperial prince and chancellor of the Chinese Five Dynasties and Ten Kingdoms Period state Southern Han. He was a son of Southern Han's founding emperor Liu Yan (Emperor Gaozu), and at one point, Liu Yan considered bypassing his older brothers Liu Bin (né Liu Hongdu, Emperor Shang) and Liu Sheng (né Liu Hongxi, Emperor Zhongzong) and making him the successor to the throne. During the subsequent reign of Liu Sheng, Liu Sheng, fearing his capability, had him assassinated.

== Background ==
It is not known when Liu Hongchang was born, and it is not known who his mother was. However, it is known that he was Liu Yan's fifth son. In 932, Liu Yan created 19 of his sons, including Liu Hongchang, imperial princes, with Liu Hongchang receiving the title of Prince of Yue.

Liu Hongchang was described to be filially pious, careful, and knowledgeable, and therefore was much favored by Liu Yan. As his two oldest brothers, Liu Yaoshu (劉耀樞) the Prince of Yong and Liu Guitu (劉龜圖) the Prince of Kang both died early, it was assumed that his third oldest brother, Liu Hongdu the Prince of Qin would be the heir to the throne. However, Liu Yan considered both Liu Hongdu and his fourth son, Liu Hongxi the Prince of Jin to be arrogant and inappropriate in their behavior, and therefore, when he fell ill in 942, discussed with the official Wang Lin (王翷) the idea of sending Liu Hongdu and Liu Hongxi out of the capital Xingwang (興王, headquartered in modern Guangzhou, Guangdong) to defend Yong (邕州, in modern Nanning, Guangxi) and Rong (容州, in modern Yulin, Guangxi) Prefectures respectively, while diverting the succession to Liu Hongchang. However, another official, Xiao Yi (蕭益), argued that bypassing older sons would create disturbances, and Liu Yan ultimately decided against the idea. When Liu Yan died shortly after, Liu Hongdu succeeded to the throne (as Emperor Shang) (and changed his name to Liu Bin).

== During Liu Bin's reign ==
Liu Bin was said to be arrogant and licentious as emperor, and many of his attendants were killed despite innocence. Liu Hongchang often tried to speak with him to change his ways, to no effect.

Later in 942, a group of agrarians, believed that a god had foreordained that Zhang Yuxian, a lowly county administrator at Bolo County (博羅, in modern Huizhou, Guangdong), was to be their ruler, rose against Southern Han rule. Liu Bin sent Liu Hongchang to command the army against Zhang, with a younger brother, Liu Honggao the Prince of Xun, serving as his deputy. However, Liu Hongchang and Liu Honggao were defeated and surrounded by Zhang's agrarian army. They escaped capture only due to the efforts of the officer Chen Daoxiang (陳道庠). Much of the eastern part of the Southern Han realm was captured by Zhang's army.

Despite this, Liu Bin remained arrogant and licentious, and ignored advice from Liu Hongchang and the eunuch Wu Huai'en (吳懷恩), both of whom tried to change his behavior. Liu Hongxi was plotting to take over the state, and therefore encouraged Liu Bin's behavior. As Liu Bin favored arm wrestling, Liu Hongxi had Chen train five arm wrestlers to wrestle with Liu Bin. In 943, one night, when Liu Bin was drunk, Chen and the arm wrestlers, at Liu Hongxi's order, killed Liu Bin and his attendants. The next morning, the princes and the officials, realizing that Liu Bin had been killed, were initially not daring to enter the palace. Liu Hongchang led his younger brothers in welcoming Liu Hongxi to the palace and offering the throne to him. Liu Hongxi then took the throne (as Emperor Zhongzong) (and changed his name to Liu Sheng).

== During Liu Sheng's reign ==
Liu Sheng made Liu Hongchang a chancellor, giving him the titles of Taiwei (太尉), Zhongshu Ling (中書令), and generalissimo of the armies of all circuits. Liu Honggao was also made a chancellor and deputy generalissimo.

After Liu Sheng took the throne, however, there were continuous rumors throughout the realm about how Liu Bin died. Liu Honggao suggested to Liu Sheng that he kill the arm wrestlers involved in the assassinations to quell the discontent. Liu Sheng did not agree, and the arm wrestlers, who were well-rewarded by Liu Sheng for assassinating Liu Bin, heard of Liu Honggao's suggestion, and in turn falsely accused him of treason. Liu Sheng sent two of the arm wrestlers, Liu Sichao (劉思潮) and Tan Lingyin (譚令禋), to lead soldiers against Liu Honggao. Liu Sichao and Tan headed to Liu Honggao's mansion and killed him as he was holding a feast. It was said that after this incident, Liu Sheng considered killing all of his brothers, and was particularly apprehensive of Liu Hongchang because of his virtues and popularity.

In spring 944, Liu Sheng sent Liu Hongchang to pay respect to the tomb of their uncle Liu Yin (Liu Yan's older brother, who was posthumously honored Emperor Liezong). While Liu Hongchang was on the way, Liu Sheng sent soldiers, disguised as bandits, to ambush him, and they successfully killed Liu Hongchang.

== Notes and references ==
- Spring and Autumn Annals of the Ten Kingdoms, vol. 61.
- Zizhi Tongjian, vols. 278, 283, 284.
