= Cao Zhongda =

Chinese official

Cao Zhongda (曹仲達) (882–943), né Cao Hongda (曹弘達), was an official of the Chinese Five Dynasties and Ten Kingdoms Period state Wuyue, serving as a chancellor during the reigns of its second king Qian Yuanguan and third king Qian Hongzuo.

== Background and service under Qian Liu ==
Cao Hongda was born in 882, during the reign of Emperor Xizong of Tang. His father Cao Gui (曹圭) was a general under Qian Liu, who would eventually control the region (modern Zhejiang) that became the territory of Wuyue. Cao Hongda was born at Linping (臨平, in modern Hangzhou, Zhejiang). After he grew older, Cao Gui wanted to train him physically, so Cao Gui had him eat with servants and not be given warm clothing even when it was in the winter. Cao Gui also had him lift bricks daily.

After Cao Hongda grew yet older, he became a guard at the headquarters for one of the circuits Qian controlled, Zhendong Circuit (鎮東, headquartered in modern Shaoxing, Zhejiang). At that time, his father Cao Gui served as the prefect of Su Prefecture (蘇州, in modern Suzhou, Jiangsu), and wanted to enter into a marital alliance with a fellow general under Qian, Chen Xun (陳詢) the prefect of Mu Prefecture (睦州, in modern Hangzhou) — by having Cao Hongda marry one of Chen's daughters. He thus sent Cao Hongda on a mission to Mu, intending to have him marry Chen's daughter there. However, a fortuneteller informed Cao Hongda and/or Cao Gui, "The Chens are not appropriate for your marital relationship. You should marry with another family to bring glory and honor on you." When he went through the Qiantang (錢塘, in modern Hangzhou), the capital of Qian's main circuit, Zhenhai Circuit (鎮海), Qian was impressed by Cao Hongda's appearance, and therefore gave him a younger sister in marriage. Cao Hongda thereafter successively served as the prefect of Tai Prefecture (台州, in modern Taizhou, Zhejiang), then of Chu Prefecture (處州, in modern Lishui, Zhejiang).

== Service under Qian Yuanguan ==
Qian Liu, who then carried the title of King of Wuyue, died in 932, and was succeeded by his son Qian Yuanguan. Qian Yuanguan, who did not take the title of king but only that of military governor (Jiedushi) of Zhenhai and Zhendong initially (as a vassal to Later Tang), put Cao Hongda in charge of the affairs of the state — effectively, to be chancellor, although not with that title as Qian Yuanguan was not claiming, at that point, statehood. When Qian Yuanguan claimed the title of king in 937 (then as a vassal of Later Tang's successor state Later Jin), he commissioned Cao, along with Shen Song and Pi Guangye, chancellors. (It was probably at this time that he changed his name to Cao Zhongda, as the name change was said to be to observe naming taboo for Qian Yuanguan's heir apparent Qian Hongzun, and it was at the time that Qian Yuanguan claimed the king title that he made Qian Hongzun his heir apparent.) He was said to be kind and honest, often donating food to the needy (implicitly, referring probably to Buddhist monks). Qian Yuanguan honored him greatly and referred to him only as "the Chancellor" rather than by name.

== Service under Qian Hongzuo ==
Qian Yuanguan died in 941 and was succeeded as king by his son (Qian Hongzun's younger brother) Qian Hongzuo — as Qian Hongzun had died earlier. During Qian Hongzuo's mourning period, Cao Zhongda served as regent. When there was subsequently a disturbance among the army ranks where the soldiers claimed that there was unfairness in the rewards given to them, Cao personally met the soldiers to comfort them. He died in 943.

== Notes and references ==
- Spring and Autumn Annals of the Ten Kingdoms, vol. 86.
- Zizhi Tongjian, vols. 277, 281, 282.
