= Liu Honggao =

Southern Han imperial prince and chancellor

Liu Honggao (劉弘杲) (923–943), formally the Prince of Xun (循王), was an imperial prince and chancellor of the Chinese Five Dynasties and Ten Kingdoms Period state Southern Han. He was falsely accused of treason and killed during the reign of his brother Liu Sheng (né Liu Hongxi, Emperor Zhongzong).

== Background ==
Liu Honggao was born in 923, his mother was Consort Xie Yiqing who was favored by his father Liu Yan, and he was Liu Yan's 10th son. In 932, Liu Yan created 19 of his sons, including Liu Honggao, imperial princes, with Liu Honggao receiving the title of Prince of Xun.

== During Liu Bin's and Liu Sheng's reigns ==
By 942, when Liu Honggao's older brother Liu Bin (né Liu Hongdu, Emperor Shang) was emperor, a group of agrarians, believed that a god had foreordained that Zhang Yuxian, a lowly county administrator at Bolo County (博羅, in modern Huizhou, Guangdong), was to be their ruler, rose against Southern Han rule. Liu Bin sent Liu Honggao's older brother Liu Hongchang the Prince of Yue to command the army against Zhang, with Liu Honggao serving as his deputy. However, Liu Hongchang and Liu Honggao were defeated and surrounded by Zhang's agrarian army. They escaped capture only due to the efforts of the officer Chen Daoxiang (陳道庠). Much of the eastern part of the Southern Han realm was captured by Zhang's army.

Liu Bin was arrogant and licentious, and he ignored advice from Liu Hongchang and the eunuch Wu Huai'en (吳懷恩), both of whom tried to change his behavior. Another brother, Liu Hongxi the Prince of Qin, was plotting to take over the state, and therefore encouraged Liu Bin's behavior. As Liu Bin favored arm wrestling, Liu Hongdu had Chen train five arm wrestlers to wrestle with Liu Bin. In 943, one night, when Liu Bin was drunk, Chen and the arm wrestlers, at Liu Hongxi's order, killed Liu Bin and his attendants. The next morning, the princes and the officials, realizing that Liu Bin had been killed, were initially not daring to enter the palace. Liu Hongchang led his younger brothers in welcoming Liu Hongxi to the palace and offering the throne to him. Liu Hongxi then took the throne (as Emperor Zhongzong) (and changed his name to Liu Sheng).

Liu Sheng made Liu Hongchang a chancellor, giving him the titles of Taiwei (太尉), Zhongshu Ling (中書令), and generalissimo of the armies of all circuits. Liu Honggao was also made a chancellor and deputy generalissimo.

After Liu Sheng took the throne, however, there were continuous rumors throughout the realm about how Liu Bin died. Liu Honggao suggested to Liu Sheng that he kill the arm wrestlers involved in the assassinations to quell the discontent. Liu Sheng did not agree, and the arm wrestlers, who were well-rewarded by Liu Sheng for assassinating Liu Bin, heard of Liu Honggao's suggestion, and in turn falsely accused him of treason. Liu Sheng sent two of the arm wrestlers, Liu Sichao (劉思潮) and Tan Lingyin (譚令禋), to lead soldiers against Liu Honggao. Liu Sichao and Tan headed to Liu Honggao's mansion and killed him as he was holding a feast. It was said that after this incident, Liu Sheng considered killing all of his brothers, which he eventually did. (Another account of Liu Honggao's death indicated that Liu Sheng sent a messenger to his mansion to summon him, and that he, knowing that death was coming, bathed and prayed before reporting to Liu Sheng's palace, where he was ordered to commit suicide.)

== Notes and references ==
- Spring and Autumn Annals of the Ten Kingdoms, vol. 61.
- Zizhi Tongjian, vols. 278, 283.
