= Liu Sheng (Southern Han) =

Emperor of Southern Han from 943 to 958

Emperor Zhongzong of Southern Han; 南漢中宗
- Emperor of Great Han

Emperor of Southern Han
- Reign: 16 April 943 – 18 September 958
- Predecessor: Liu Bin (Emperor Shang)
- Successor: Liu Chang
- Born: 920 probably Guangzhou, Southern Han
- Died: 18 September 958 (aged 37–38); Guangzhou, Southern Han
- Burial: Zhao Mausoleum (昭陵; in modern Huangpu District, Guangzhou)
- Issue: Liu Chang (Liu Jixing), the Prince of Wei, later emperor; Liu Xuanxing (劉璇興), the Prince of Gui (killed by Liu Chang 958); Liu Qingxing (劉慶興), the Prince of Jing; Liu Baoxing (劉保興), the Prince of Zhen; Liu Chongxing (劉崇興), the Prince of Mei
Names
- Liú Hóngxī (劉弘熙), later changed to Liú Shèng (劉晟)
Era dates
- Yìngqián (應乾): 943; Qiánhé (乾和): 943–958
Posthumous name
- Emperor Wénwǔ Guāngmíng Xiào (文武光明孝皇帝)
Temple name
- Zhōngzōng (中宗)
- House: Liu
- Dynasty: Southern Han
- Father: Liu Yan

Liu Sheng (Chinese: 劉晟; 920–958), born Liu Hongxi (劉弘熙), possibly nicknamed Jun (雋), also known by his temple name as the Emperor Zhongzong of (Southern) Han ((南)漢中宗), was the third emperor of the Southern Han dynasty of China during the Five Dynasties and Ten Kingdoms period. He succeeded his brother, Liu Bin (Emperor Shang), whom he had ordered assassinated to allow himself to take the throne.

== Background ==
Liu Hongxi was born in 920, as the fourth son of Liu Yan, who was then already the emperor of Southern Han (as Emperor Gaozu)—and therefore, was likely born at Southern Han's capital Xingwang (興王, in modern Guangzhou, Guangdong).

The first historical reference to Liu Hongxi was in 932, when Liu Yan created his sons imperial princes—with Liu Hongxi receiving the title of Prince of Jin. As his two oldest brothers Liu Yaoshu (劉耀樞) and Liu Guitu (劉龜圖)—both of whom also received princely titles in 932 and therefore were likely still alive then—died early, his third older brother Liu Hongdu the Prince of Qin became the expectant heir as the oldest surviving son of Liu Yan.

In 942, Liu Yan fell seriously ill. As he had become concerned by this point that both Liu Hongdu and Liu Hongxi were arrogant and inappropriate in behavior, he considered sending them out of the capital Xingwang to defend Yong (邕州, in modern Nanning, Guangxi) and Rong (容州, in modern Yulin, Guangxi) Prefectures respectively, while diverting succession to a younger son, Liu Hongchang the Prince of Yue, whom he considered filially pious, careful, and intelligent. When he consulted the official Xiao Yi (蕭益), however, Xiao argued that passing the throne to a younger son would create disturbances, and so Liu Yan stopped considering that. He soon died, and Liu Hongdu succeeded him as emperor.

== Liu Bin's reign ==
After Liu Yan's death, Liu Hongdu became emperor and changed his name to Liu Bin. Liu Hongxi became the head of his administration. Liu Bin was arrogant and inattentive to the matters of state. Even though he was still within the mourning period for his father Liu Yan, he often drank and played music, and often took prostitutes on night out-of-palace excursions. He also liked to watch naked men and women. Liu Hongxi was ambitious and had designs on the throne. He decided to encourage his older brother's behavior. With the assistance of general Chen Daoxiang (陳道庠) and five others, Liu Hongxi had his older brother killed after an arm-wrestling match at the palace on 15 April 943. With the support of his brother Liu Hongchang, Liu Hongxi proclaimed himself emperor and took the name Liu Sheng.

== Reign ==
=== Early reign ===
Upon taking the throne, Liu Sheng made his brothers Liu Hongchang the Prince of Yue and Liu Honggao the Prince of Xun chancellors. Immediately after his enthronement, however, there were rumors throughout the Southern Han state about how Liu Bin's death occurred. To quell the discontent, Liu Honggao suggested putting Chen Daoxiang and the other conspirators to death. Liu Sheng refused, and eventually, Chen heard about Liu Honggao's suggestion. He therefore falsely accused Liu Honggao of plotting treason. On Liu Sheng's instructions, Chen and one of the conspirators, Tan Lingyin (譚令禋) ambushed Liu Honggao at a feast that Liu Honggao was holding at his mansion and put him to death. After this incident, Liu Sheng became suspicious of his brothers, particularly Liu Hongchang, due to Liu Hongchang's virtues and popularity. In 944, he sent Liu Hongchang to pay tribute to the tomb of their uncle Liu Yin, and then had bandits intercept Liu Hongchang on the way and kill him. Hongchang was then the main chancellor and Liu Sheng made Chen Wo the chancellor after Hongchang's death. He also put one brother, Liu Hongbi (劉弘弼) the Prince of Qi, under house arrest, and poisoned another, Liu Hongze (劉弘澤) the Prince of Zhen, to death. In 945, he killed another brother, Liu Hongya (劉弘雅) the Prince of Shao. He also put four of Chen's coconspirators to death, and forced the high-level official Wang Lin (王翷), whom he believed had supported Liu Hongchang's succession, to commit suicide. It was said that after these deaths, the entire state was in fear. In 946, he also put Chen and another official who warned Chen, Deng Shen (鄧伸), to death.

In 947, Liu Sheng, concerned that his brothers would contend for the throne with his sons, executed many, possibly all, of his remaining brothers—Liu Hongbi, Liu Hongdao (劉弘道) the Prince of Gui, Liu Hongyi (劉弘益) the Prince of Ding, Liu Hongji (劉弘濟) the Prince of Bian, Liu Hongjiǎn (劉弘簡) the Prince of Tong, Liu Hongjiàn (劉弘建) the Prince of Yi, Liu Hongwei (劉弘偉) the Prince of En, and Liu Hongzhao (劉弘照) the Prince of Yi (different character than Liu Hongjiàn). He took their daughters into his palace to be part of concubinage. He also built palaces with a total of a thousand rooms and adorned it with jewels. He further created a number of inhumane punishments, calling it, "the Living Hell." (It was said that Liu Sheng's killing of his brothers was encouraged by and planned in conjunction with his trusted eunuch Lin Yanyu.)

In 948, Liu Sheng commissioned the official Zhong Yunzhang (鍾允章) on a diplomatic mission to Southern Han's northern neighbor Chu, seeking a marital alliance with Chu's prince Ma Xiguang. (Liu Yan's wife—likely not Liu Sheng's mother—was a sister of Ma Xiguang's.) Ma Xiguang refused, angering Liu Sheng, and Liu Sheng, after Zhong advised him that the Chu state was embroiled in fraternal struggles for power among Ma Xiguang's brothers, decided to attack Chu. Later in the year, he sent the general Wu Huai'en (吳懷恩) to attack Chu. Wu defeated the Chu general Xu Zhixin (徐知新), and seized He (賀州, in modern Hezhou, Guangxi) and Zhao (昭州, in modern Guilin, Guangxi) Prefectures for Southern Han.

=== Middle reign ===
In 950, Liu Sheng commissioned his ladies in waiting Lu Qiongxian (盧瓊仙) and Huang Qiongzhi (黃瓊之) as "female Shizhong" and had them officially participate in the governance of the state. It was also said that by this point, prominent members of the imperial Liu clan and officials with past accomplishments had largely been executed, so eunuchs such as Lin Yanyu were very powerful.

By 951, Chu, weakened by the internecine struggles between the Ma brothers, had fallen to its northeastern neighbor Southern Tang. Ma Yin's son Ma Xiyin, however, was still in control of Chu's Jingjiang Circuit (靜江, headquartered in modern Guilin) as its deputy military governor. Liu Sheng commissioned Wu Huai'en with an army and sent Wu to the borders with Jingjiang, planning to conquer it. Meanwhile, another Ma brother, Ma Xi'e, who had briefly seized the Chu throne before being deposed, was still had some followers, and he sent the general Peng Yanhui (彭彥暉) to Jinjiang's capital Gui Prefecture (桂州) to take over actual command, drawing Ma Xiyin's ire, so Ma Xiyin secretly summoned the general Xu Keqiong to Gui Prefecture, and Xu was able to expel Peng from the city. Wu took this opportunity to capture Chu's Meng Prefecture (蒙州, in modern Wuzhou, Guangxi) and send his soldiers to pillage the rest of Jingjiang territory, causing Ma Xiyin and Xu to be terrified, but they had no strategy to defeat Wu. Liu then wrote a letter to Ma Xiyin, claiming that his intent was to aid Ma Xiyin:

King Wumu [(i.e., the Ma brothers' father, Chu's founding king Ma Yin)] took over the entire Chu territory and built up a rich, powerful, and peaceful state for 50-some years. It was unfortunate that Uncle 35 [(i.e., Ma Xiguang)] and Uncle 30 [(i.e., Ma Xi'e)] fought with and slaughtered each other, such that they surrendered the ancestral foundation to the enemy to the north. I heard that the Tang forces have already taken over [(Chu's capital)] Changsha, and I have to believe in my heart that Guilin would be their next target. Our empire had long been in alliance with your kingdom, and the relationship was strengthened by marital relations. Now that I see that you are about to fall, so how can I not save you? I have launched an army to head toward you by both water and land, and I will surely let you, Uncle Chancellor, always have a military command and always control territory.

Ma Xiyin considered surrendering to Southern Han, but could not decide immediately. When Wu quickly reached Gui Prefecture, Ma Xiyin and Xu instead abandoned it and fled to Quan Prefecture (全州, in modern Guilin). Wu was thereafter able to take over not only Gui but the rest of Jingjiang, allowing Southern Han to possess all of the Lingnan region. Later in the year, Liu further sent the generals Pan Chongche (潘崇徹) and Xie Guan (謝貫) to capture Chen Prefecture (郴州, in modern Chenzhou, Hunan) from Southern Tang.

=== Late reign ===
In 953, Liu Sheng made his five sons—Liu Jixing, Liu Xuanxing (劉璇興), Liu Qingxing (劉慶興), Liu Baoxing (劉保興), and Liu Chongxing (劉崇興)—imperial princes.

In 954, Liu Sheng commissioned one of his remaining brothers, Liu Hongmiao (劉弘邈) the Prince of Gao to be the military governor of Xiongwu Circuit (雄武, headquartered in modern Nanning, Guangxi). As both Liu Hongbi and Liu Hongze had previously served at that post before their deaths, Liu Hongmiao became apprehensive and tried to decline the post, requesting that he remain as an imperial guard officer, but Liu Sheng refused the offer. When Liu Hongmiao reached Xiongwu, he tried to ward of suspicion by entrusting the governance to others, instead spending his days drinking and praying to the gods and the spirits. There were nevertheless accusations of treason made against him, and Liu Sheng sent Lin Yanyu to Xiongwu to force him to commit suicide. In 955, Liu Sheng further killed Liu Hongzheng (劉弘政) the Prince of Tong, and it was said that by this point, all of his brothers were dead.

In 956, Lin died, causing the people of the realm to celebrate. Before Lin's death, he recommended another eunuch, Gong Chengshu, to succeed him, and Liu Sheng commissioned Gong to oversee the eunuchs.

In 957, Liu Sheng, hearing that Later Zhou, which controlled the Central Plains, was repeatedly scoring victories in its war against Southern Tang, became worried that if Later Zhou conquered Southern Tang, Southern Han would become its target. He tried to send emissaries to submit tributes to Later Zhou's emperor Guo Rong, but the emissaries were blocked by Later Zhou's vassal Zhou Xingfeng, who then controlled the former Chu lands. In fear, he began to build up his fleet and prepare for defense against an invasion, but not long after began to take up drinking and feasting again, stating, "It would be fortunate for myself to be spared. Why worry about future generations?"

In 958, Liu Sheng died. Liu Jixing (who then changed his name to Liu Chang) succeeded him as emperor.

Regnal titles
Preceded by Liu Bin (Emperor Shang)	Emperor of Southern Han; 943–958	Succeeded by Liu Chang
Preceded by Ma Xiyin of Chu	Emperor of China (Northeastern Guangxi) (de facto); 951–958	Succeeded by Liu Chang
Preceded by Li Jing of Southern Tang	Emperor of China (Northeastern Guangxi) (de jure); 951–958	Succeeded by Liu Chang
