= Li Yinheng =

Li Yinheng (Chinese: 李殷衡) was an official of the Chinese Southern Han dynasty, serving as a chancellor.

== Background ==
It is not known when Li Yinheng was born. He came from a prominent aristocratic family, and both his great-grandfather Li Jifu and grandfather Li Deyu were chancellors. Li Deyu, in particular, was particularly powerful during the reign of Emperor Wuzong of Tang, controlling the affairs of state. After Emperor Wuzong was succeeded by his uncle Emperor Xuānzong, however, Li Deyu lost power and was eventually exiled, as was his son (Li Yinheng's father) Li Ye (李燁). Because of this, Li Yinheng was unable to obtain important offices early in his life.

After the fall of the Tang dynasty, Li Yinheng served under Zhu Wen, the founding emperor of the succeeding Later Liang, as You Bujue (右補闕), a low-level advisory official at the legislative bureau of government (中書省, Zhongshu Sheng). In 908, Emperor Taizu sent him as an emissary (assisting Zhao Guangyi) in officially bestowing the office of military governor (Jiedushi) of Qinghai (清海, headquartered in modern Guangzhou, Guangdong) and Jinghai (靜海, headquartered in modern Hanoi, Vietnam) Circuits on the warlord Liu Yin, who controlled Qinghai and who was nominally Emperor Taizu's vassal. When Zhao and Li arrived at Qinghai, Liu kept both of them on his staff and did not return them to Later Liang proper. (Li was willing to stay because he saw the Central Plain region as still being in turmoil.) Liu subsequently engaged him in much of the strategic planning and made him an assistant to Liu in Liu's role as military governor.

== Career under Liu Yan ==
In 917, Liu Yin's brother and successor Liu Yan declared himself the emperor of a new state of Yue (soon changed to Han, and therefore the state became historically known as Southern Han). He commissioned Li Yinheng, along with Zhao Guangyi and another official, Yang Dongqian, as chancellors with the designation Tong Zhongshu Menxia Pingzhangshi (同中書門下平章事), with Li receiving the secondary office of deputy minister of rites (禮部侍郎, Libu Shilang). That was the last historical reference to Li, who was said to have died in office, but with no indication when he did.

== Notes and references ==
- Spring and Autumn Annals of the Ten Kingdoms (十國春秋), vol. 62.
- Book of Southern Han (南漢書), vol. 9.
- Zizhi Tongjian, vols. 267, 270.
