= Liu Bin (Southern Han) =

Emperor of Southern Han from 942 to 943

Emperor Shang of Southern Han 南漢殤帝
- Emperor of Southern Han

Emperor of Southern Han
- Reign: 10 June 942 – 15 April 943
- Predecessor: Liu Yan (Emperor Gaozu)
- Successor: Liu Sheng (Emperor Zhongzong)
- Born: 920; Probably Guangzhou, Southern Han
- Died: 15 April 943 (aged 22–23); Guangzhou, Southern Han
Names
- Liú Hóngdù (劉弘度), later changed to Liú Bīn (劉玢)
Era name and dates
- Guāngtiān (光天): 10 June 942 – 16 April 943
Posthumous name
- Emperor Shāng (殤皇帝, "short-lived")
- House: Liu
- Dynasty: Southern Han
- Father: Liu Yan
- Mother: Consort Zhao

Liu Bin (Chinese: 劉玢) (920 – 15 April 943), né Liu Hongdu (劉弘度), possibly nicknamed Shou (壽), also known by his posthumous name as the Emperor Shang of Southern Han (南漢殤帝), was the second emperor of the Chinese Southern Han dynasty. He reigned only briefly, from 942 to 943, from the time of the death of his father Liu Yan (Emperor Gaozu) to the time he was assassinated in a coup headed by his brother Liu Hongxi (later known as Liu Sheng, Emperor Zhongzong).

== Background ==
Liu Hongdu was born in 920, as the third son of Liu Yan, who was then already the emperor of Southern Han (as Emperor Gaozu)— and therefore, was likely born at Southern Han's capital Xingwang (興王, in modern Guangzhou, Guangdong). His mother was Liu Yan's concubine Consort Zhao, who would later receive the title of Zhaoyi (昭儀). (The biographies for her and for Liu Hongdu in the Spring and Autumn Annals of the Ten Kingdoms conflictingly state that she was favored by Liu Yan and that she was not favored by Liu Yan.)

The first historical reference to Liu Hongdu was in 932, when Liu Yan created his sons imperial princes—with Liu Hongdu receiving the title of Prince of Bin, which was shortly later changed to Prince of Qin. As his older brothers Liu Yaoshu (劉耀樞) and Liu Guitu (劉龜圖)—both of whom also received princely titles in 932 and therefore were likely still alive then—died early, Liu Hongdu became the expectant heir as the oldest surviving son of Liu Yan. By 934, Liu Hongdu was the commander of the imperial guard corps, when Liu Yan had him recruiting 1,000 guard soldiers to be loyal to him. Liu Hongdu ended up recruiting many young hoodlums and became close to them. The chancellor Yang Dongqian found this inappropriate and tried to persuade Liu Yan to stop this, but Liu Yan paid no heed to Yang's words, leading to Yang's requesting retirement. (As Yang, in his words to Liu Yan, referred to Liu Hongdu as the heir to the state, it was likely that by this point Liu Yaoshu and Liu Guitu were deceased.)

In 942, Liu Yan fell seriously ill. As he had become concerned by this point that both Liu Hongdu and a younger son, Liu Hongxi the Prince of Jin, were arrogant and inappropriate in behavior, he considered sending them out of the capital Xingwang to defend Yong (邕州, in modern Nanning, Guangxi) and Rong (容州, in modern Yulin, Guangxi) Prefectures respectively, while diverting succession to a younger son, Liu Hongchang the Prince of Yue, whom he considered filially pious, careful, and intelligent. When he consulted the official Xiao Yi (蕭益), however, Xiao argued that passing the throne to a younger son would create disturbances, and so Liu Yan stopped considering that. He soon died, and Liu Hongdu succeeded him as emperor.

== Reign ==
After Liu Hongdu took the throne, he changed his name to Liu Bin. Liu Hongxi became the head of his administration. He honored his mother Consort Zhao as consort dowager.

Shortly after Liu Bin took the throne, there was a major agrarian rebellion that rose at Xun Prefecture (循州, in modern Huizhou, Guangdong), under the leadership of the local official Zhang Yuxian, who was said to be appointed by an invisible god who spoke in voices. Zhang's rebellion captured many cities, and when Liu Bin sent his brothers Liu Hongchang and Liu Honggao the Prince of Xun to attack Zhang's army, they were surrounded and nearly captured, only saved due to the efforts of the general Chen Daoxiang (陳道庠). Much of the eastern part of the Southern Han state was captured by Zhang.

Despite this, it was said that Liu Bin was arrogant and inattentive to the matters of state. Even though he was still within the mourning period for his father Liu Yan, he often drank and played music, and often took prostitutes on night out-of-palace excursions. He also liked watch naked men and women. As those who went against his will were often put to death, few dared to speak to him to correct his behavior, except for Liu Hongchang and the eunuch Wu Huai'en (吳懷恩). It was also said that he was suspicious of his brothers, as well as other members of the clan and the officials, such that before they were to enter the palace to see him, they were first strip-searched before they could enter. Liu Hongxi, who was ambitious and had designs on the throne, decided to encourage his frivolous behavior, and therefore offered much jewelry, decorations, and women to him. As Liu Bin liked arm wrestling, Liu Hongxi also had Chen train a group of five strong men—Liu Sichao (劉思潮), Tan Lingyin (譚令禋), Lin Shaoqiang (林少強), Lin Shaoliang (林少良), and He Changting (何昌廷)—to be arm wrestlers, which Liu Bin was pleased about.

On April 15, 943, Liu Bin held a feast for the imperial princes at Changchun Palace, and there were arm wrestling matches that they watched there. The feast ended when Liu Bin fell extremely drunk. Liu Hongxi had Chen and the arm wrestlers that he trained carry Liu Bin back to his bedchambers, and had him pounded to death there. His attendants were slaughtered. The next morning, initially, the officials and the princes, realizing that something was wrong, did not dare to enter the palace. Eventually, Liu Hongchang led the other brothers in a display of support for Liu Hongxi to take the throne, which Liu Hongxi did.

== Notes ==
Regnal titles
Preceded by Liu Yan (Emperor Gaozu)	Emperor of Southern Han; 942–943	Succeeded by Liu Sheng (Emperor Zhongzong)
