= Southern Han =

State in southern China (917–971)

Han / Yue 漢 / 越
- 917–971
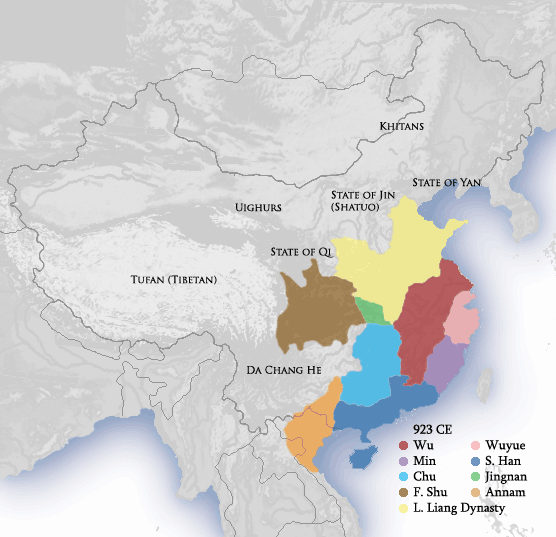
- Southern Han (dark blue)
- Capital: Xingwang Fu (Guangzhou)
- Common languages: Middle Chinese; Medieval Yue
- Government: Monarchy
- Emperor
  - 917–941: Emperor Gaozu
  - 941–943: Emperor Shangdi
  - 943–958: Emperor Zhongzong
  - 958–971: Emperor Houzhu
- Historical era: Five Dynasties and Ten Kingdoms Period
  - Established: 917
  - Renamed from "Yue" to "Han": 918
  - Ended by the Song dynasty: 971
Preceded by	Succeeded by
Tang dynasty	Song dynasty; Ngô dynasty
- Today part of: China; Vietnam

Southern Han
- Traditional Chinese: 南漢
- Simplified Chinese: 南汉
- Literal meaning: South Han
Transcriptions
Standard Mandarin
- Hanyu Pinyin: Nán Hàn
- Wade–Giles: Nan Han
Yue: Cantonese
- Jyutping: Naam^{4} Hon^{3}

Southern Han (Chinese: 南漢; pinyin: Nán Hàn; Jyutping: Naam^{4} Hon^{3}; 917–971), officially Han (Chinese: 漢; Jyutping: Hon3), originally Yue (Chinese: 越; Jyutping: Jyut6), a dynastic kingdom that existed during the Five Dynasties and Ten Kingdoms period. It was located on China's southern coast, controlling modern Guangdong and Guangxi. The dynasty greatly expanded its capital Xingwang Fu (Chinese: 興王府; pinyin: Xìngwáng Fǔ; Jyutping: Hing^{1} Wong^{4} Fu^{2}, present-day Guangzhou). It attempted but failed to annex the autonomous polity of Jinghai, which was controlled by the Vietnamese.

== Founding of the Southern Han ==
Liu Yin (Chinese: 劉隱; Jyutping: Lau4 Jan2) was named regional governor and military officer by the Tang court in 905. Though the Tang fell two years later, Liu did not declare himself the founder of a new kingdom as other southern leaders had done. He merely inherited the title of Prince of Nanping in 909.

It was not until Liu Yin's death in 917 that his brother, Liu Yan (Chinese: 劉龑; Jyutping: Lau4 Jim2), declared the founding of a new kingdom, which he initially called "Yue" (越); he changed the name to Han (漢) in 918. This was because his surname Liu (Chinese: 劉; Jyutping: Lau4) was the imperial surname of the Han dynasty and he claimed to be a descendant of that famous dynasty. The kingdom is often referred to as the Southern Han dynasty throughout China's history. It attempted but failed to annex the independent polity of Jinghai which was controlled by the Vietnamese.

== Territorial extent ==
With its capital at present-day Guangzhou, the domains of the kingdom spread along the coastal regions of present-day Guangdong, Guangxi and the island of Hainan. It had borders with the kingdoms of Min, Chu and the Southern Tang as well as the non-Han Chinese kingdoms of Dali. The Southern Tang occupied all of the northern boundary of the Southern Han after Min and Chu were conquered by the Southern Tang in 945 and 951 respectively.

== War with the Vietnamese ==
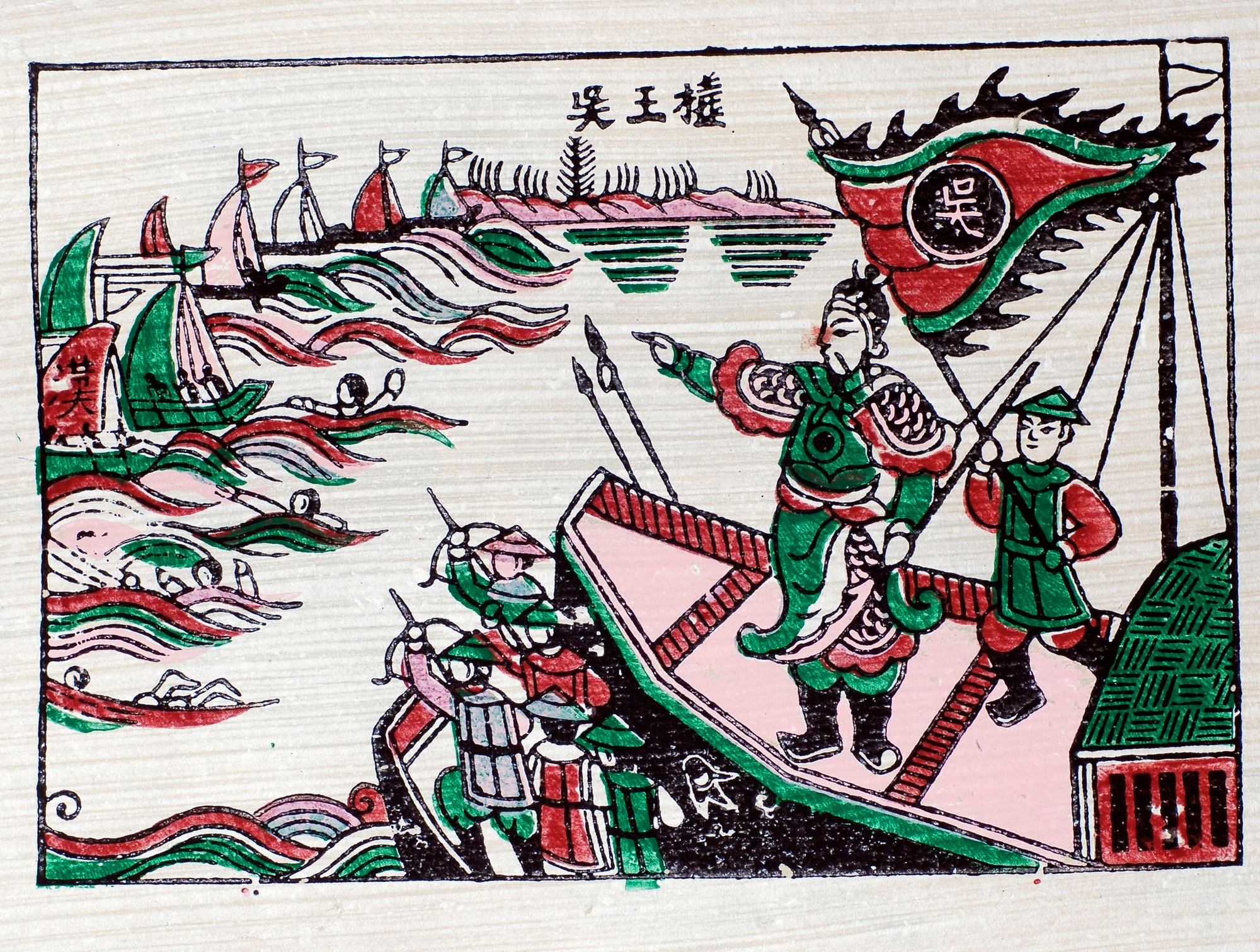
Đông Hồ woodblock depiction of Ngô Quyền leading his troops against Southern Han forces on the Bạch Đằng River, 938 AD

During the late 9th century as the Tang dynasty weakened, local Vietnamese lords began taking control of its domain in Jinghai (northern Vietnam). Southern Han campaigned twice against the Vietnamese in 931 and 938 in an attempt to add these Vietnamese territories to their realm, but failed both.

== Fall of the Southern Han ==
The Five Dynasties ended in 960 when the Song dynasty was founded to replace the Later Zhou. From that point, the new Song rulers set themselves about to continue the reunification process set in motion by the Later Zhou. Through the 960s and 970s, the Song increased its influence in the south until finally it was able to force the Southern Han dynasty to submit to its rule in 971.

== Rulers ==
Sovereigns in the Southern Han Kingdom 917–971
Temple Names	Posthumous Names	Personal Names	Period of Reigns	Era Names
Gao Zu (高祖 gāo zǔ)	Tian Huang Da Di (天皇大帝 tiān huáng dà dì)	Liu Yan (劉巖 liú yán) Liu Yan (劉龑 liú yǎn) after 926	917–941	Qianheng (乾亨 qián hēng) 917–925 Bailong (白龍 bái lóng) 925–928; Dayou (大有 dà yǒu) 928–941
Did not exist	Shang Di (殤帝 shāng dì)	Liu Bin (劉玢 liú bīn)	941–943	Guangtian (光天 guāng tiān) 941–943
Zhong Zong (中宗 zhōng zōng)	Wénwǔ Guāngmíng Xiào (文武光明孝皇帝) Too tedious thus not used when referring to this sovereign	Liu Sheng (劉晟 liú shèng)	943–958	Yingqian (應乾 yìng qián) 943 Qianhe (乾和 qiàn hé) 943–958
Hou Zhu (後主 hòu zhǔ)	Did not exist	Liu Chang (劉鋹 liú chǎng)	958–971	Dabao (大寶 dà bǎo) 958–971

== Rulers family tree ==
Southern Han rulers family tree

Liu Zhiqian 劉知謙 (d. 894)
Liu Yin 劉隱 b. 874–d. 911	Liu Yan 劉龑 889–942; Gaozu 高祖 r. 917–942	Liu Tai 劉台
Emperor; Huizong of Min	Liu Hua 劉華 b. 896–d. 930	Liu Hongchang 劉弘昌 d. 944; Prince of Yue 越王	Liu Bin 劉玢 920–943; Shāng 殤皇 r. 942–943	Liu Sheng 劉晟 920–958; Zhongzong r. 943–958	Liu Honggao 劉弘杲 d. 943; Prince of Xun 循王
Liu Chang 劉鋹; 942–980 r. 958–971
