= April 15 =

April 15 this year in various calendars
- Wednesday, 15 April 2026
Akan	Kwawukuo
Armenian	29 Ahekani 1475
Aztec	Tlaxochimaco 15, 5 Calli
Babylonian	26 Adaru, 2336 SE
Balinese pawukon	Menga, Beteng, Jaya, Paing, Was, Buda of Landep, Guru, Tulus, Manusa
Bengali	2 Boisakh, BS 1433
Chinese	Yin Earth Goat・Wall Mansion; Fire Horse Year, Month 2, Day 28 (Qingming, 5 days until Guyu)
Common Era	15 April 2026 CE
Coptic	7 Parmouti, AM 1742
Egyptian	4 Epagomenae, 2774 NE
Ethiopian	7 Miyāzyā, 2018 Amätä Məhrät
French Republican	Décade III, Sextidi de Germinal de l'Année 234 de la République
Gregorian	15 April, AD 2026
Hebrew	28 Nisan, AM 5786; Omer 13
Hindu	Pūrvabhādrapada・Brahman; Solar: 2 Vaiśākha, 1948 SE; Lunisolar: Trayodaśī, Kṛishna pakṣa of Caitra, 2083 VE; Rāudra・5127 KY・1,872,680
Icelandic	Miðvikudagur, 23 Einmánuður 2025
Islamic	27 Shawwal, AH 1447 (using tabular method)
ISO week date	2026-W16-3
Japanese	28 Kisaragi, Reiwa 8 (Seimei, 5 days until Kokuu)
Julian	2 April, AD 2026 (AM 7534)
Julian day	2461146
Korean	28 Tokkidal, 4359 DE
Maya	13.0.13.9.3; 16 Pop, 5 Akbal
Roman	ante diem IV Nonas Apriles, MMDCCLXXIX AUC
Solar Hijri	26 Farvardin, SH 1405
Tibetan	28 dbo, me pho rta 2153 or 1772 or 1000

<<	April					>>
Su	Mo	Tu	We	Th	Fr	Sa
			1	2	3	4
5	6	7	8	9	10	11
12	13	14	15	16	17	18
19	20	21	22	23	24	25
26	27	28	29	30
2026

April 15 in recent years
2026 (Wednesday)
2025 (Tuesday)
2024 (Monday)
2023 (Saturday)
2022 (Friday)
2021 (Thursday)
2020 (Wednesday)
2019 (Monday)
2018 (Sunday)
2017 (Saturday)

April 15 is the 105th day of the year (106th in leap years) in the Gregorian calendar; 260 days remain until the end of the year.

== Events ==
=== Pre-1600 ===
- 769 – The Lateran Council ends by condemning the Council of Hieria and anathematizing its iconoclastic rulings.
- 1071 – Bari, the last Byzantine possession in southern Italy, is surrendered to the Norman Robert Guiscard.
- 1071 – The sharif of Mecca changes the khutbah from the Shiite Fatimid caliph in Cairo to the Sunni Abbasid Caliph in Bagdhad.
- 1191 – Henry VI, King of Germany, is crowned Holy Roman Emperor by pope Celestine III.
- 1277 – The Mamluk Sultanate defeats the Mongols in the battle of Elbistan.
- 1450 – Battle of Formigny: Toward the end of the Hundred Years' War, the French attack and nearly annihilate English forces, ending English domination in Northern France.

=== 1601–1900 ===
- 1632 – Battle of Rain: Swedes under Gustavus Adolphus defeat the Holy Roman Empire during the Thirty Years' War.
- 1642 – Irish Confederate Wars: A Confederate Irish militia is routed in the Battle of Kilrush when it attempts to halt the progress of a Royalist Army.
- 1715 – The Pocotaligo Massacre triggers the start of the Yamasee War in colonial South Carolina.
- 1736 – Foundation of the short-lived Kingdom of Corsica.
- 1738 – Serse, an Italian opera by George Frideric Handel, receives its premiere performance in London, England.
- 1755 – Samuel Johnson's A Dictionary of the English Language is published in London.
- 1817 – Thomas Hopkins Gallaudet and Laurent Clerc found the American School for the Deaf (then called the Connecticut Asylum for the Education and Instruction of Deaf and Dumb Persons), the first American school for deaf students, in Hartford, Connecticut.
- 1861 – President Abraham Lincoln calls for 75,000 militiamen to quell the insurrection that soon became the American Civil War.
- 1865 – President Abraham Lincoln dies after being shot the previous evening by actor John Wilkes Booth. Vice President Andrew Johnson becomes president.
- 1892 – The General Electric Company is formed.
- 1896 – Closing ceremony of the Games of the I Olympiad in Athens, Greece.
- 1900 – Philippine–American War: Filipino guerrillas launch a surprise attack on U.S. infantry and begin a four-day siege of Catubig, Philippines.

=== 1901–present ===
- 1912 – The British passenger liner RMS Titanic sinks in the North Atlantic at 2:20 a.m., two hours and forty minutes after hitting an iceberg. Only 712 of 2,207 passengers and crew on board survive.
- 1919 – Jeam-ri massacre: The Imperial Japanese Army murdered more than 20 residents of Jeam-ri as retaliation of the March First Movement protests in the region.
- 1920 – Two security guards are murdered during a robbery in South Braintree, Massachusetts. Anarchists Sacco and Vanzetti would be convicted of and executed for the crime, amid much controversy.
- 1922 – U.S. Senator John B. Kendrick of Wyoming introduces a resolution calling for an investigation of a secret land deal, which leads to the discovery of the Teapot Dome scandal.
- 1923 – Insulin becomes generally available for use by people with diabetes.
- 1923 – Racially motivated Nihon Shōgakkō fire lit by a serial arsonist kills 10 children in Sacramento, California.
- 1936 – First day of the Arab revolt in Mandatory Palestine.
- 1941 – World War II: In the Belfast Blitz, 200 bombers of the German Luftwaffe attack Belfast, killing some 1,000 people.
- 1942 – World War II: The George Cross is awarded "to the island fortress of Malta" by King George VI.
- 1945 – Bergen-Belsen concentration camp is liberated.
- 1947 – Jackie Robinson debuts for the Brooklyn Dodgers, breaking baseball's color line.
- 1952 – First flight of the Boeing B-52 Stratofortress.
- 1955 – McDonald's restaurant dates its founding to the opening of a franchised restaurant by Ray Kroc, in Des Plaines, Illinois.
- 1960 – At Shaw University in Raleigh, North Carolina, Ella Baker leads a conference that results in the creation of the Student Nonviolent Coordinating Committee, one of the principal organizations of the civil rights movement in the 1960s.
- 1969 – The EC-121 shootdown incident: North Korea shoots down a United States Navy aircraft over the Sea of Japan, killing all 31 on board.
- 1970 – During the Cambodian Civil War, massacre of the Vietnamese minority results in 800 bodies flowing down the Mekong river into South Vietnam.
- 1986 – The United States launches Operation El Dorado Canyon, its bombing raids against Libyan targets in response to a discotheque bombing in West Germany that killed two U.S. servicemen.
- 1989 – Hillsborough disaster: A human crush occurs at Hillsborough Stadium, home of Sheffield Wednesday, in the FA Cup Semi-final, resulting in the deaths of 97 Liverpool fans.
- 1989 – Upon Hu Yaobang's death, the Tiananmen Square protests of 1989 begin in China.
- 1994 – Marrakesh Agreement relating to foundation of World Trade Organization is adopted.
- 2002 – Air China Flight 129 crashes on approach to Gimhae International Airport in Busan, South Korea, killing 129 people.
- 2013 – Two bombs explode near the finish line at the Boston Marathon in Boston, Massachusetts, killing three people and injuring over 500 others.
- 2013 – A wave of bombings across Iraq kills at least 75 people.
- 2014 – In the worst massacre of the South Sudanese Civil War, more than 400 civilians are gunned down after seeking refuge in houses of worship as well as hospitals.
- 2019 – The cathedral of Notre-Dame de Paris in France is seriously damaged by a large fire.
- 2021 – A mass shooting occurs at a FedEx Ground facility in Indianapolis, Indiana, killing nine and injuring seven.
- 2026 – Twelve people and the perpetrator are killed and twelve others injured in a mass shooting at a school in Onikişubat, Turkey.

== Births ==
=== Pre-1600 ===
- 68 BC – Gaius Maecenas, Roman politician (died 8 BC)
- 1282 – Frederick IV, Duke of Lorraine (died 1329)
- 1442 – John Paston, English noble (died 1479)
- 1452 – Leonardo da Vinci, Italian painter, sculptor, and architect (died 1519)
- 1469 – Guru Nanak, the first Sikh guru (died 1539)
- 1552 – Pietro Cataldi, Italian mathematician and astronomer (died 1626)
- 1563 – Guru Arjan Dev, fifth Sikh leader (died 1606)
- 1588 – Claudius Salmasius, French author and scholar (died 1653)
- 1592 – Francesco Maria Brancaccio, Catholic cardinal (died 1675)

=== 1601–1900 ===
- 1641 – Robert Sibbald, Scottish physician and geographer (died 1722)
- 1642 – Suleiman II, Ottoman sultan (died 1691)
- 1646 – Christian V of Denmark (died 1699)
- 1684 – Catherine I of Russia (died 1727)
- 1688 – Johann Friedrich Fasch, German violinist and composer (died 1758)
- 1707 – Leonhard Euler, Swiss mathematician and physicist (died 1783)
- 1710 – William Cullen, Scottish physician and chemist (died 1790)
- 1731 – William B. Whiting, New York politician (died 1796)
- 1741 – Charles Willson Peale, American painter and soldier (died 1827)
- 1771 – Nicolas Chopin, French-Polish educator (died 1844)
- 1772 – Étienne Geoffroy Saint-Hilaire, French biologist and zoologist (died 1844)
- 1793 – Friedrich Georg Wilhelm von Struve, German astronomer and academic (died 1864)
- 1795 – Maria Schicklgruber, mother of Alois Hitler and the paternal grandmother of Adolf Hitler (died 1847)
- 1800 – James Clark Ross, English captain and explorer (died 1862)
- 1808 – William Champ, English-Australian politician, 1st Premier of Tasmania (died 1892)
- 1809 – Hermann Grassmann, German linguist and mathematician (died 1877)
- 1817 – William Crowther, Dutch-Australian politician, 14th Premier of Tasmania (died 1885)
- 1828 – Jean Danjou, French captain (died 1863)
- 1829 – Mary Harris Thompson, Mary Harris Thompson, American physician and surgeon (died 1895)
- 1832 – Wilhelm Busch, German poet, painter, and illustrator (died 1908)
- 1841 – Mary Grant Roberts, Australian zoo owner (died 1921)
- 1841 – Joseph E. Seagram, Canadian businessman and politician, founded the Seagram Company Ltd (died 1919)
- 1843 – Henry James, American novelist, short story writer, and critic (died 1916)
- 1856 – Jean Moréas, Greek poet and critic (died 1910)
- 1858 – Émile Durkheim, French sociologist, psychologist, and philosopher (died 1917)
- 1861 – Bliss Carman, Canadian-British poet and playwright (died 1929)
- 1863 – Ida Freund, Austrian-born chemist and educator (died 1914)
- 1874 – George Harrison Shull, American botanist and geneticist (died 1954)
- 1874 – Johannes Stark, German physicist and academic, Nobel Prize laureate (died 1957)
- 1875 – James J. Jeffries, American boxer and promoter (died 1953)
- 1877 – Georg Kolbe, German sculptor (died 1947)
- 1877 – William David Ross, Scottish philosopher (died 1971)
- 1878 – Robert Walser, Swiss author and playwright (died 1956)
- 1879 – Melville Henry Cane, American lawyer and poet (died 1980)
- 1883 – Stanley Bruce, Australian captain and politician, 8th Prime Minister of Australia (died 1967)
- 1885 – Tadeusz Kutrzeba, Polish general (died 1947)
- 1886 – Nikolay Gumilyov, Russian poet and critic (died 1921)
- 1887 – Felix Pipes, Austrian tennis player (died 1983)
- 1887 – William Forgan Smith, Scottish-Australian politician, 24th Premier of Queensland (died 1953)
- 1888 – Maximilian Kronberger, German poet and author (died 1904)
- 1889 – Thomas Hart Benton, American painter and educator (died 1975)
- 1889 – A. Philip Randolph, American activist (died 1979)
- 1890 – Percy Shaw, English businessman, invented the cat's eye (died 1976)
- 1892 – Theo Osterkamp, German general and pilot (died 1975)
- 1892 – Corrie ten Boom, Dutch-American clocksmith, Nazi resister, and author (died 1983)
- 1894 – Nikita Khrushchev, Russian general and politician, 7th Premier of the Soviet Union (died 1971)
- 1894 – Bessie Smith, African-American singer and actress (died 1937)
- 1895 – Clark McConachy, New Zealand snooker player (died 1980)
- 1895 – Abigail Mejia, Dominican feminist activist, nationalist, literary critic and educator (died 1941)
- 1896 – Nikolay Semyonov, Russian physicist and chemist, Nobel Prize laureate (died 1986)
- 1898 – Harry Edward, Guyanese-English sprinter (died 1973)
- 1900 – Ramón Iribarren, Spanish civil engineer (died 1967)

=== 1901–present ===
- 1901 – Joe Davis, English snooker player (died 1978)
- 1901 – Ajoy Mukherjee, Indian politician, Chief Minister of West Bengal (died 1986)
- 1901 – René Pleven, French businessman and politician, Prime Minister of France (died 1993)
- 1902 – Fernando Pessa, Portuguese journalist (died 2002)
- 1903 – John Williams, English-American actor (died 1983)
- 1904 – Arshile Gorky, Armenian-American painter and illustrator (died 1948)
- 1907 – Nikolaas Tinbergen, Dutch-English ethologist and ornithologist, Nobel Prize laureate (died 1988)
- 1908 – eden ahbez, American songwriter and recording artist (died 1995)
- 1908 – Lita Grey, American actress (died 1995)
- 1909 – Robert Edison Fulton Jr., American inventor and adventurer (died 2004)
- 1910 – Sulo Bärlund, Finnish shot putter (died 1986)
- 1910 – Miguel Najdorf, Polish-Argentinian chess player and theoretician (died 1997)
- 1912 – William Congdon, American-Italian painter and sculptor (died 1998)
- 1912 – Kim Il Sung, North Korean general and politician, 1st Supreme Leader of North Korea (died 1994)
- 1915 – Elizabeth Catlett, African-American sculptor and illustrator (died 2012)
- 1916 – Alfred S. Bloomingdale, American businessman (died 1982)
- 1916 – Helene Hanff, American author and screenwriter (died 1997)
- 1917 – Hans Conried, American actor (died 1982)
- 1917 – Elmer Gedeon, American baseball player and bomber pilot (died 1944)
- 1917 – James Kee, American lawyer and politician (died 1989)
- 1918 – Hans Billian, German film director, screenwriter, and actor (died 2007)
- 1919 – Alberto Breccia, Uruguayan-Argentinian author and illustrator (died 1993)
- 1920 – Godfrey Stafford, English-South African physicist and academic (died 2013)
- 1920 – Thomas Szasz, Hungarian-American psychiatrist and academic (died 2012)
- 1920 – Richard von Weizsäcker, German soldier and politician, 6th President of Germany (died 2015)
- 1921 – Georgy Beregovoy, Ukrainian-Russian general, pilot, and astronaut (died 1995)
- 1921 – Angelo DiGeorge, American physician and endocrinologist (died 2009)
- 1922 – Michael Ansara, Syrian-American actor (died 2013)
- 1922 – Donn F. Draeger, American martial arts practitioner (died 1982)
- 1922 – Hasrat Jaipuri, Indian poet and songwriter (died 1999)
- 1922 – Harold Washington, American lawyer and politician, 51st Mayor of Chicago (died 1987)
- 1922 – Graham Whitehead, English racing driver (died 1981)
- 1923 – Artur Alliksaar, Estonian poet and author (died 1966)
- 1923 – Robert DePugh, American activist, founded the Minutemen (an anti-Communist organization) (died 2009)
- 1924 – M. Canagaratnam, Sri Lankan politician (died 1980)
- 1924 – Rikki Fulton, Scottish comedian (died 2004)
- 1924 – Neville Marriner, English violinist and conductor (died 2016)
- 1926 – Jurriaan Schrofer, Dutch sculptor, designer, and educator (died 1990)
- 1927 – Robert Mills, American physicist and academic (died 1999)
- 1929 – Gérald Beaudoin, Canadian lawyer and politician (died 2008)
- 1929 – Adrian Cadbury, English rower and businessman (died 2015)
- 1930 – Georges Descrières, French actor (died 2013)
- 1930 – Vigdís Finnbogadóttir, Icelandic educator and politician, 4th President of Iceland
- 1931 – Kenneth Bloomfield, Northern Irish civil servant (died 2025)
- 1931 – Tomas Tranströmer, Swedish poet, translator, and psychologist Nobel Prize laureate (died 2015)
- 1933 – Roy Clark, American musician and television personality (died 2018)
- 1933 – David Hamilton, English-French photographer and director (died 2016)
- 1933 – Elizabeth Montgomery, American actress and producer (died 1995)
- 1935 – Stavros Paravas, Greek actor and producer (died 2008)
- 1936 – Raymond Poulidor, French cyclist (died 2019)
- 1937 – Bob Luman, American singer-songwriter and guitarist (died 1978)
- 1937 – Robert W. Gore, American engineer and businessman, co-inventor of Gore-Tex (died 2020)
- 1938 – Claudia Cardinale, Italian actress (died 2025)
- 1938 – Hso Khan Pha, Burmese-Canadian geologist and politician (died 2016)
- 1939 – Marty Wilde, English singer-songwriter and actor
- 1939 – Desiré Ecaré, Ivorian filmmaker (died 2009)
- 1940 – Jeffrey Archer, English author, playwright, and politician (died 2026)
- 1940 – Penelope Coelen, South African actress, model, beauty queen and 1958 Miss World
- 1940 – Willie Davis, American baseball player and actor (died 2010)
- 1940 – Robert Lacroix, Canadian economist and academic
- 1940 – Robert Walker, American actor (died 2019)
- 1941 – Howard Berman, American lawyer and politician
- 1942 – Francis X. DiLorenzo, American bishop (died 2017)
- 1942 – Walt Hazzard, American basketball player and coach (died 2011)
- 1942 – Kenneth Lay, American businessman and criminal (died 2006)
- 1942 – Tim Lankester, English economist and academic
- 1943 – Pınar Kür, Turkish author, playwright, and academic (died 2025)
- 1943 – Robert Lefkowitz, American physician and biochemist, Nobel Prize laureate
- 1943 – Veronica Linklater, Baroness Linklater, English politician (died 2022)
- 1943 – Hugh Thompson, Jr., American soldier and pilot (died 2006)
- 1944 – Dave Edmunds, Welsh singer-songwriter, guitarist, and producer
- 1946 – John Lloyd, Scottish journalist and author
- 1946 – Pete Rouse, American politician, White House Chief of Staff
- 1947 – Linda Bloodworth-Thomason, American screenwriter and producer
- 1947 – Martin Broughton, English businessman
- 1947 – Lois Chiles, American model and actress
- 1947 – David Omand, English civil servant and academic
- 1947 – Cristina Husmark Pehrsson, Swedish nurse and politician, Swedish Minister for Social Security
- 1948 – Christopher Brown, English historian, curator, and academic
- 1948 – Michael Kamen, American composer and conductor (died 2003)
- 1948 – Phil Mogg, English singer-songwriter and musician
- 1949 – Alla Pugacheva, Russian singer-songwriter and actress
- 1949 – Craig Zadan, American director, producer, and screenwriter (died 2018)
- 1950 – Josiane Balasko, French actress, director, and screenwriter
- 1950 – Amy Wright, American actress
- 1950 – Karel Kroupa, Czech football player
- 1951 – Heloise, American journalist and author
- 1951 – John L. Phillips, American captain and astronaut
- 1951 – Stuart Prebble, English journalist and producer
- 1951 – Marsha Ivins, American engineer and astronaut
- 1952 – Kym Gyngell, Australian actor, comedian, and screenwriter
- 1952 – Brian Muir, English sculptor and set designer
- 1952 – Avital Ronell, Czech-American philosopher and academic
- 1952 – Glenn Shadix, American actor, (died 2010)
- 1955 – Dodi Fayed, Egyptian film producer (died 1997)
- 1955 – Joice Mujuru, Zimbabwean politician
- 1956 – Michael Cooper, American basketball player and coach
- 1957 – Evelyn Ashford, American runner and coach
- 1958 – Keith Acton, Canadian ice hockey player and coach
- 1958 – John Bracewell, New Zealand cricketer
- 1958 – Memos Ioannou, Greek basketball player and coach
- 1958 – Benjamin Zephaniah, English actor, author, poet, and playwright (died 2023)
- 1959 – Fruit Chan, Chinese director, producer, and screenwriter
- 1959 – Kevin Lowe, Canadian ice hockey player, coach, and manager
- 1959 – Emma Thompson, English actress, comedian, author, activist and screenwriter
- 1960 – Pierre Aubry, Canadian ice hockey player
- 1960 – Susanne Bier, Danish director and screenwriter
- 1960 – Pedro Delgado, Spanish cyclist and sportscaster
- 1960 – Tony Jones, English snooker player
- 1961 – Neil Carmichael, English academic and politician
- 1961 – Carol W. Greider, American molecular biologist
- 1961 – Dawn Wright, American geographer and oceanographer
- 1962 – Nawal El Moutawakel, Moroccan athlete and politician
- 1962 – Tom Kane, American voice actor (died 2026)
- 1963 – Alex Crawford, Nigerian-South African journalist
- 1963 – Manzoor Elahi, Pakistani cricketer
- 1963 – Manoj Prabhakar, Indian cricketer and sportscaster
- 1964 – Andre Joubert, South African rugby player
- 1964 – Lee Kernaghan, Australian singer-songwriter and guitarist
- 1965 – Soichi Noguchi, Japanese engineer and astronaut
- 1965 – Linda Perry, American singer-songwriter, musician and record producer
- 1965 – Kevin Stevens, American ice hockey player
- 1966 – Samantha Fox, English singer-songwriter and actress
- 1966 – Mott Green, American businessman (died 2013)
- 1967 – Frankie Poullain, Scottish bass player and songwriter
- 1967 – Dara Torres, American swimmer and journalist
- 1968 – Ben Clarke, English rugby player and coach
- 1968 – Brahim Lahlafi, Moroccan-French runner
- 1968 – Ed O'Brien, English guitarist
- 1969 – Jeromy Burnitz, American baseball player
- 1969 – Kaisa Roose, Estonian pianist and conductor
- 1969 – Jimmy Waite, Canadian-German ice hockey player and coach
- 1970 – Chris Huffins, American decathlete and coach
- 1971 – Philippe Carbonneau, French rugby player
- 1971 – Finidi George, Nigerian footballer
- 1971 – Jason Sehorn, American football player
- 1971 – Josia Thugwane, South African runner
- 1971 – Karl Turner, English lawyer and politician
- 1972 – Arturo Gatti, Italian-Canadian boxer (died 2009)
- 1972 – Lou Romano, American animator and voice actor
- 1974 – Kim Min-kyo, South Korean actor and director
- 1974 – Danny Pino, American actor and screenwriter
- 1974 – Mike Quinn, American football player
- 1974 – Douglas Spain, American actor, director, and producer
- 1974 – Tim Thomas, American ice hockey player
- 1975 – Sarah Teichmann, German-American biophysicist and immunologist
- 1976 – Jason Bonsignore, Canadian ice hockey player and coach
- 1976 – Darius Regelskis, Lithuanian footballer
- 1976 – Kęstutis Šeštokas, Lithuanian basketball player
- 1976 – Steve Williams, English rower
- 1977 – Sudarsan Pattnaik, Indian sculptor
- 1977 – Brian Pothier, American ice hockey player
- 1978 – Milton Bradley, American baseball player
- 1978 – Tim Corcoran, American baseball player
- 1978 – Luis Fonsi, Puerto Rican-American singer-songwriter and dancer
- 1978 – Chris Stapleton, American country singer-songwriter and guitarist
- 1979 – Luke Evans, Welsh actor and singer
- 1980 – Patrick Carney, American drummer, musician, and producer
- 1980 – James Foster, English cricketer
- 1980 – Raül López, Spanish basketball player
- 1980 – Willie Mason, New Zealand-Australian rugby league player
- 1980 – Billy Yates, American football player
- 1981 – Andrés D'Alessandro, Argentinian footballer
- 1982 – Michael Aubrey, American baseball player
- 1982 – Anthony Green, American singer-songwriter
- 1982 – Albert Riera, Spanish footballer and manager
- 1982 – Seth Rogen, Canadian-American actor, director, producer, and screenwriter
- 1983 – Alice Braga, Brazilian actress
- 1983 – Matt Cardle, English singer-songwriter and guitarist
- 1983 – Dudu Cearense, Brazilian footballer
- 1983 – Andreas Fransson, Swedish skier (died 2014)
- 1983 – Ilya Kovalchuk, Russian ice hockey player
- 1983 – Martin Pedersen, Danish cyclist
- 1984 – Antonio Cromartie, American football player
- 1984 – Cam Janssen, American ice hockey player
- 1984 – Daniel Paille, Canadian ice hockey player
- 1985 – Ryan Hamilton, Canadian ice hockey player
- 1986 – Tom Heaton, English footballer
- 1986 – Sylvain Marveaux, French footballer
- 1988 – Blake Ayshford, Australian rugby league player
- 1988 – Steven Defour, Belgian footballer
- 1988 – Chris Tillman, American baseball pitcher
- 1989 – Darren Nicholls, Australian rugby league player
- 1990 – Emma Watson, English actress
- 1991 – Daiki Arioka, Japanese idol, singer, and actor
- 1991 – Javier Fernández López, Spanish figure skater
- 1992 – Remo Freuler, Swiss footballer
- 1992 – John Guidetti, Swedish footballer
- 1992 – Jeremy McGovern, Australian rules football player
- 1993 – Felipe Anderson, Brazilian footballer
- 1994 – Brodie Grundy, Australian rules football player
- 1994 – Shaunae Miller-Uibo, Bahamian sprinter
- 1995 – Leander Dendoncker, Belgian footballer
- 1997 – Ashleigh Gardner, Australian cricketer
- 1997 – Maisie Williams, English actress
- 1998 – Sexyy Red, American rapper
- 1999 – Denis Shapovalov, Israeli-Canadian tennis player
- 2001 – Shanti Dope, Filipino rapper

== Deaths ==
=== Pre-1600 ===
- 628 – Suiko, emperor of Japan (born 554)
- 943 – Liu Bin, emperor of Southern Han (born 920)
- 956 – Lin Yanyu, Chinese court official and eunuch
- 1053 – Godwin, Earl of Wessex (born 1001)
- 1136 – Richard Fitz Gilbert de Clare (born 1094)
- 1220 – Adolf of Altena, German archbishop (born 1157)
- 1237 – Richard Poore, English ecclesiastic
- 1415 – Manuel Chrysoloras, Greek philosopher and translator (born 1355)
- 1446 – Filippo Brunelleschi, Italian sculptor and architect (born 1377)
- 1502 – John IV of Chalon-Arlay, Prince of Orange (born 1443)
- 1558 – Hurrem Sultan, wife of Suleiman the Magnificent and the Haseki sultan of Ottoman Empire (born 1505)
- 1578 – Wolrad II, Count of Waldeck-Eisenberg, German nobleman (born 1509)

=== 1601–1900 ===
- 1610 – Robert Persons, English Jesuit priest, insurrectionist, and author (born 1546)
- 1632 – George Calvert, 1st Baron Baltimore, English politician, English Secretary of State (born 1580)
- 1652 – Patriarch Joseph of Moscow, Russian patriarch
- 1659 – Simon Dach, German poet and hymnwriter (born 1605)
- 1719 – Françoise d'Aubigné, Marquise de Maintenon, French wife of Louis XIV (born 1635)
- 1754 – Jacopo Riccati, Italian mathematician and academic (born 1676)
- 1757 – Rosalba Carriera, Italian painter (born 1673)
- 1761 – Archibald Campbell, 3rd Duke of Argyll, Scottish lawyer and politician, Lord President of the Court of Session (born 1682)
- 1761 – William Oldys, English historian and author (born 1696)
- 1764 – Peder Horrebow, Danish astronomer and mathematician (born 1679)
- 1764 – Madame de Pompadour, mistress of King Louis XV (born 1721)
- 1765 – Mikhail Lomonosov, Russian chemist and physicist (born 1711)
- 1788 – Giuseppe Bonno, Austrian composer (born 1711)
- 1793 – Ignacije Szentmartony, Croatian priest, mathematician, and astronomer (born 1718)
- 1854 – Arthur Aikin, English chemist and mineralogist (born 1773)
- 1861 – Sylvester Jordan, Austrian-German lawyer and politician (born 1792)
- 1865 – Abraham Lincoln, 16th President of the United States (born 1809)
- 1888 – Matthew Arnold, English poet and critic (born 1822)
- 1889 – Father Damien, Belgian priest and saint (born 1840)
- 1898 – Te Keepa Te Rangihiwinui, New Zealand commander and politician

=== 1901–present ===
- 1912 – Victims of the Titanic disaster:
  - Thomas Andrews, Irish shipbuilder (born 1873)
  - John Jacob Astor IV, American colonel, businessman, and author (born 1864)
  - Archibald Butt, American general and journalist (born 1865)
  - Jacques Futrelle, American journalist and author (born 1875)
  - Benjamin Guggenheim, American businessman (born 1865)
  - Henry B. Harris, American producer and manager (born 1866)
  - Wallace Hartley, English violinist and bandleader (born 1878)
  - Charles Melville Hays, American businessman (born 1856)
  - James Paul Moody, English Sixth Officer (born 1887)
  - William McMaster Murdoch, Scottish First Officer (born 1873)
  - Jack Phillips, English telegraphist (born 1887)
  - Edward Smith, English Captain (born 1850)
  - William Thomas Stead, English journalist (born 1849)
  - Ida Straus, German-American businesswoman (born 1849)
  - Isidor Straus, German-American businessman and politician (born 1845)
  - John B. Thayer, American business and sportsman (born 1862)
  - Henry Tingle Wilde, English chief officer (born 1872)
- 1917 – János Murkovics, Slovene author, poet, and educator (born 1839)
- 1925 – Fritz Haarmann, German serial killer (born 1879)
- 1927 – Gaston Leroux, French journalist and author (born 1868)
- 1938 – César Vallejo, Peruvian journalist, poet, and playwright (born 1892)
- 1942 – Robert Musil, Austrian-Swiss author and playwright (born 1880)
- 1943 – Aristarkh Lentulov, Russian painter and set designer (born 1882)
- 1944 – Nikolai Fyodorovich Vatutin, Russian general (born 1901)
- 1945 – Hermann Florstedt, German SS officer (born 1895)
- 1948 – Radola Gajda, Montenegrin-Czech general and politician (born 1892)
- 1949 – Wallace Beery, American actor, director, and screenwriter (born 1885)
- 1962 – Clara Blandick, American actress (born 1880)
- 1962 – Arsenio Lacson, Filipino journalist and politician, Mayor of Manila (born 1912)
- 1963 – Edward Greeves, Jr., Australian footballer (born 1903)
- 1966 – Habibullah Bahar Chowdhury, Bengali politician, writer, journalist, first health minister of East Pakistan (born 1906)
- 1967 – Totò, Italian comedian (born 1898)
- 1971 – Gurgen Boryan, Armenian poet and playwright (born 1915)
- 1971 – Friedebert Tuglas, Estonian author and critic (born 1886)
- 1979 – David Brand, Australian politician, 19th Premier of Western Australia (born 1912)
- 1980 – Raymond Bailey, American actor and soldier (born 1904)
- 1980 – Jean-Paul Sartre, French philosopher and author, Nobel Prize laureate (born 1905)
- 1982 – Arthur Lowe, English actor (born 1915)
- 1984 – Tommy Cooper, Welsh comedian and magician (born 1921)
- 1986 – Jean Genet, French novelist, poet, and playwright (born 1910)
- 1988 – Kenneth Williams, English actor and screenwriter (born 1926)
- 1989 – Hu Yaobang, Chinese soldier and politician, former General Secretary of the Chinese Communist Party (born 1915)
- 1990 – Greta Garbo, Swedish-American actress (born 1905)
- 1993 – Leslie Charteris, English author and screenwriter (born 1907)
- 1993 – John Tuzo Wilson, Canadian geophysicist and geologist (born 1908)
- 1998 – William Congdon, American-Italian painter and sculptor (born 1912)
- 1998 – Pol Pot, Cambodian general and politician, 29th Prime Minister of Cambodia (born 1925)
- 1999 – Harvey Postlethwaite, English engineer (born 1944)
- 2000 – Edward Gorey, American poet and illustrator (born 1925)
- 2001 – Joey Ramone, American singer-songwriter (born 1951)
- 2002 – Damon Knight, American author and critic (born 1922)
- 2002 – Byron White, American football player, lawyer, and jurist, Associate Justice of the Supreme Court (born 1917)
- 2004 – Mitsuteru Yokoyama, Japanese illustrator (born 1934)
- 2007 – Brant Parker, American illustrator (born 1920)
- 2008 – Krister Stendahl, Swedish bishop, theologian, and scholar (born 1921)
- 2009 – Clement Freud, German-English journalist, academic, and politician (born 1924)
- 2009 – László Tisza, Hungarian-American physicist and academic (born 1907)
- 2009 – Salih Neftçi, Turkish economist and author (born 1947)
- 2010 – Jack Herer, American author and activist (born 1939)
- 2010 – Michael Pataki, American actor and director (born 1938)
- 2011 – Vittorio Arrigoni, Italian journalist, author, and activist (born 1975)
- 2012 – Paul Bogart, American director and producer (born 1919)
- 2012 – Dwayne Schintzius, American basketball player (born 1968)
- 2013 – Benjamin Fain, Ukrainian-Israeli physicist and academic (born 1930)
- 2013 – Richard LeParmentier, American-English actor and screenwriter (born 1946)
- 2013 – Jean-François Paillard, French conductor (born 1928)
- 2014 – John Houbolt, American engineer and academic (born 1919)
- 2014 – Eliseo Verón, Argentinian sociologist and academic (born 1935)
- 2015 – Jonathan Crombie, Canadian-American actor and screenwriter (born 1966)
- 2015 – Surya Bahadur Thapa, Nepalese politician, 24th Prime Minister of Nepal (born 1928)
- 2017 – Clifton James, American actor (born 1920)
- 2017 – Emma Morano, Italian supercentenarian, last person verified born in the 1800s (born 1899)
- 2018 – R. Lee Ermey, American actor (born 1944)
- 2018 – Vittorio Taviani, Italian film director and screenwriter (born 1929)
- 2022 – Bilquis Edhi, Pakistani philanthropist and wife of Abdul Sattar Edhi (born 1947)
- 2022 – Henry Plumb, British politician and farmer (born 1925)
- 2022 – Liz Sheridan, American actress (born 1929)
- 2024 – Whitey Herzog, American professional baseball outfielder and manager (born 1931)
- 2024 – Josip Manolić, Croatian politician, prime minister, and speaker of the Chamber of Counties (born 1920)
- 2025 – Wink Martindale, American DJ, radio personality, and TV personality (born 1933)
- 2026 – José Santamaría, Uruguayan-Spanish footballer and manager (born 1929)

== Holidays and observances ==
- Christian feast day:
  - Abbo II of Metz
  - Blessed César de Bus
  - Father Damien (Catholic and Episcopal Church)
  - Hunna
  - Paternus of Avranches
  - April 15 (Eastern Orthodox liturgics)
- Day of the Sun (North Korea)
- Father Damien Day (Hawaii)
- Hillsborough Disaster Memorial (Liverpool, England)
- Jackie Robinson Day (United States)
- National American Sign Language Day (United States)
- Pohela Boishakh (Bengali New Year; India)
- Tax Day, the official deadline for filing an individual tax return (or requesting an extension). (United States, Philippines)
- Universal Day of Culture
