= Hope Development School fire =

1924 multi-fatality building fire in California

Coordinates: 33.9606°N 118.4515°W

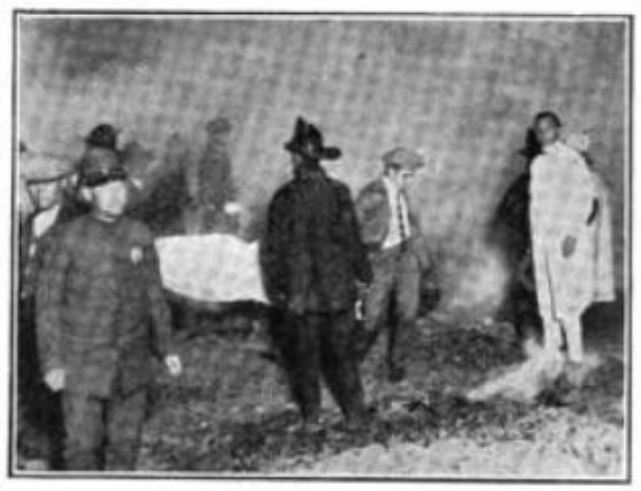
Firefighters remove bodies from the site of the Hope Development School fire

The Hope Development School fire started about 9 p.m. on the evening of May 31, 1924 in Playa Del Rey, Los Angeles, California. The fire at the Hope Development School for Deficient Girls killed 24 people, primarily the mentally disabled or behaviorally challenged girls who were residents of the home, as well as the matron and her eight-year-old son.

== Background ==
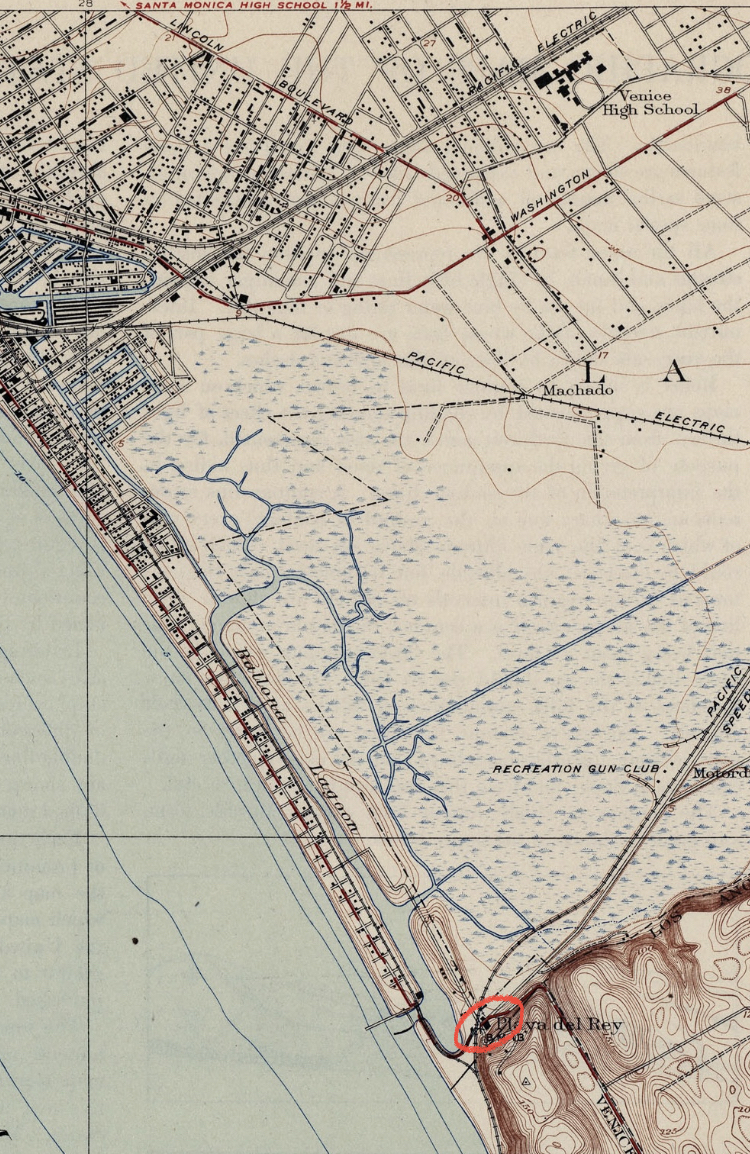
Isolated location of Hope Development School in 1924 circled in red

The school was home to 38 or 39 girls and young women, ranging in age from four to 26 years old. According to the Los Angeles Times, “Of the 39 patients, 24 came to the school from Juvenile Court. The others came from families unable to care for them.”

The school was “located on a lagoon, nearly three miles from the nearest fire station.” Originally built as a resort village in 1902, the settlement had seen a decline in fortunes. The school building (a former hotel and then brothel) was surrounded by sand dunes to the south, the Pacific to the west, and the undeveloped marshland that is now Ballona Wetlands to the north and east. The hotel operation, with its forty rooms and large dining area, had closed in 1917, reopening as the school in 1920.

Access to the school was either by the infrequent streetcars (Venice–Playa del Rey Line, Redondo Beach via Playa Del Rey) or the partially paved, partially lit roads (such as Culver Boulevard) that ran nearby. Much of the land surrounding the school was used for agriculture (celery was a major crop), or left undeveloped for the seasonal duck hunters.

== Fire ==
The wood-frame building was an acknowledged fire hazard but the director had been unable to find a new housing situation that would accept the students and so they remained at the former hotel. All the doors were locked to keep the children safe inside; at least one was tied to her bed at night to keep her from falling out.

The fire was first observed by a gas station attendant and a disabled veteran living on the beach. After initially trying to enter the burning building, the veteran drove 2.5 mi (4.0 km) to the fire station at Venice to sound the alarm, passing five poorly marked alarm boxes along the way.

The assistant matron is credited with saving the girls who survived. The fire was started intentionally by a teenage resident of the home. The surviving matrons later said that the culprit had no ability to recognize the potentially disastrous consequences of her actions in lighting the match.

The remains of the 24th victim were discovered a week after the fire had been extinguished. Several of the victims share a mass grave at Inglewood Park Cemetery. There were an additional 42 injuries, including at least 19 students who jumped or were thrown out of the burning building, six firefighters (some of whom encountered a live high-tension electrical wire), and at least 12 civilians who were involved in extinguishing the fire and assisting with the rescues.

== See also ==
- Babbs Switch fire (1924)
- Nihon Shōgakkō fire (1923)
- Cleveland School fire (1923)
- Collinwood school fire (1908)
