= Kaysa =

Kaysa may refer to:

- A type of dried apricot
- Kaysa Pritchard (born 1994), Samoan international rugby league footballer
- Qaysa, village and municipality in the Balakan Rayon of Azerbaijan

== See also ==
- Kajsa
- Kaisa (disambiguation)
