= Kaisa (name) =

- Gender: Female
- Language: Finnish

Origin
- Region of origin: Finland, Estonia

Other names
- Related names: Katariina, Katherine, Kajsa, Kaarina

Kaisa is a Finnish and Estonian feminine given name, a diminutive of Katherine and its variants, and may refer to:

- Kaisa Garedew (born 1978), Finnish politician
- Kaisa Hiilelä (1891–1977), Finnish politician
- Kaisa Korhonen (born 1941), Finnish writer
- Kaisa Leka (born 1978), Finnish artist and politician
- Kaisa Mäkäräinen (born 1983), Finnish biathlete
- Kaisa Miettinen (born 1965), Finnish mathematician
- Kaisa Nyberg, Finnish cryptographer
- Kaisa Pajusalu (born 1989), Estonian rower
- Kaisa Parviainen (1914–2002), Finnish javelin thrower
- Anna-Kaisa Rantanen (born 1978), Finnish association football player
- Kaisa Roose (born 1969), Estonian conductor
- Sanna-Kaisa Saari (born 1987), Finnish beauty pageant contestant
- Aino-Kaisa Saarinen (born 1979), Finnish cross country skier
- Kaisa Sere (1954–2012), Finnish computer scientist
- Kaisa Varis (born 1975), Finnish cross country skier and biathlete

== See also ==
- Kajsa
