= Pöyry (surname) =

Pöyry is a Finnish surname. Notable people with the surname include:

- Kaisa Pöyry (1818–1892), Finnish folk healer and herbalist
- Jaakko Pöyry (1924–2006), Finnish industrialist
- Pekka Pöyry (1939–1980), Finnish jazz and rock saxophonist and flutist
