= Kajsa =

- Gender: Female
- Language: Swedish

Origin
- Region of origin: Sweden, Finland

Other names
- Derived: Katarina
- Related names: Kaisa

Kajsa is a Swedish feminine given name. Initially, Kajsa, Kaisa or Cajsa was a variation of the name Karin, in turn a variation of the name Katarina (Catherine). It is known in Sweden since 1540. It is also used in Finland and Norway.

Notable people with the name include:

- Halta-Kajsa (1792–1857), Swedish story teller
- Kajsa Bergqvist (born 1976), Swedish high jumper
- Kajsa Bergström (born 1981), Swedish curler
- Kajsa Ekis Ekman (born 1980), Swedish journalist and writer
- Kajsa Ernst (born 1962), Swedish actress
- Kajsa Grytt (born 1961), Swedish musician
- Kajsa Kling (born 1988), Swedish alpine skier
- Kajsa Nilsson (born 1982), Swedish orienteer
- Kajsa Norman (1820–1903), Swedish folk musician
- Kajsa Ollongren (born 1967), Dutch-Swedish politician
- Kajsa Reingardt (born 1957), Swedish actress
- Kaisa Pöyry (1818-1892), Finnish cunning woman and herbalist
- Kajsa Rinaldo Persson (born 1997), Swedish tennis player
- Kajsa Thoor (1971–2023), Swedish journalist and television presenter
- Kajsa Wahlberg, Swedish police official
- Cajsa Wahllund (1771-1843), Swedish-born Finnish restaurateur
- Cajsa Warg (1703-1769), Swedish cookbook author

== Fictional figures ==
- Kajsa Anka, Swedish name for Daisy Duck
- Ysätters-Kajsa, legendary creature in Swedish folklore
- Kajsa Kavat, story by Swedish writer Astrid Lindgren, named after the main character

== See also ==
- Kaisa (name)
