= KESA =

KESA or Kesa may refer to:

== People with the name ==
- Dan Kesa (born 1971), Serbian-Canadian ice hockey player
- Teemu Kesä (born 1981), Finnish ice hockey player
- Kesa Van Osch (born 1991), Canadian curler

== Other uses ==
- Kesa (clothing), Buddhist monk robes
- Kesa Electricals, a multinational electrical retailing company
- Kanpur Electricity Supply Company, electricity supply company in Kanpur, India
- Karunamoyee metro station, Kolkata, West Bengal, India (by Kolkata Metro station code)
- KESA (FM), a radio station (100.9 FM) licensed to Eureka Springs, Arkansas, United States

== See also ==
- Kes (disambiguation)
- Kaisa (disambiguation)
- Kaesa Station, a station in Nakano, Japan
