= Kaisa =

Kaisa may refer to:

- Kaisa (name), Finnish and Estonian feminine given name
- Kaisa, Estonia, village in Saaremaa Parish, Saare County, Estonia
- Kaisa (billiards), a cue sport mostly played in Finland
- Kaisa, snow goose dæmon of Serafina Pekkala, a character in the His Dark Materials novel series by Philip Pullman
- Kai'Sa, a character in the video game League of Legends and its associated virtual band K/DA

== See also ==
- Kaysa (disambiguation)
