= Abjit =

Former village in Balakan, Azerbaijan

- Location within Azerbaijan Location within Shaki-Zagatala Economic Region
- Coordinates: 41°43′22″N 46°14′07″E
- Country: Azerbaijan
- Rayon: Balakan
- Municipality: Qaysa

Population (2014)
  - Total: 0
- Time zone: UTC+4 (AZT)
  - Summer (DST): UTC+5 (AZT)

Abjit is a former village in the Balakan Rayon of Azerbaijan. The village formed part of the municipality of Qaysa.
