= Japanese mission school fire =

1923 anti-Japanese arson in California

Nihon Shōgakkō fire
- Date: April 15, 1923
- Time: Around midnight, PT
- Location: Sacramento, California, United States; 38°34′35″N 121°30′12″W
- Cause: Arson
- Motive: Anti-Japanese sentiment
- Perpetrator: Fortunato Valencia Padilla
- Deaths: 10 children
- Convicted: Fortunato Valencia Padilla
- Trial: September 1, 1923 – November 7, 1923
- Verdict: Guilty
- Convictions: First-degree murder
- Sentence: Life imprisonment

The Nihon Shōgakkō fire, or Japanese mission school fire, was a racially motivated arson that killed ten children in Sacramento, California, on April 15, 1923, at the dormitory of a Buddhist boarding school for students of Japanese ancestry. Fortunato Valencia Padilla, a Mexican-American itinerant from the Rio Grande Valley, admitted to committing the arson after his arrest in July 1923. Padilla confessed to at least 25 other fires in California, 13 of which were committed against Japanese households and Japanese-owned properties. Padilla was indicted on first-degree murder charges for the school fire on September 1, 1923, in Sacramento, with the prosecution seeking capital punishment. He was found guilty and sentenced to life imprisonment. He was incarcerated at Folsom State Prison and later San Quentin State Prison; he died in prison in 1970.

== Background ==
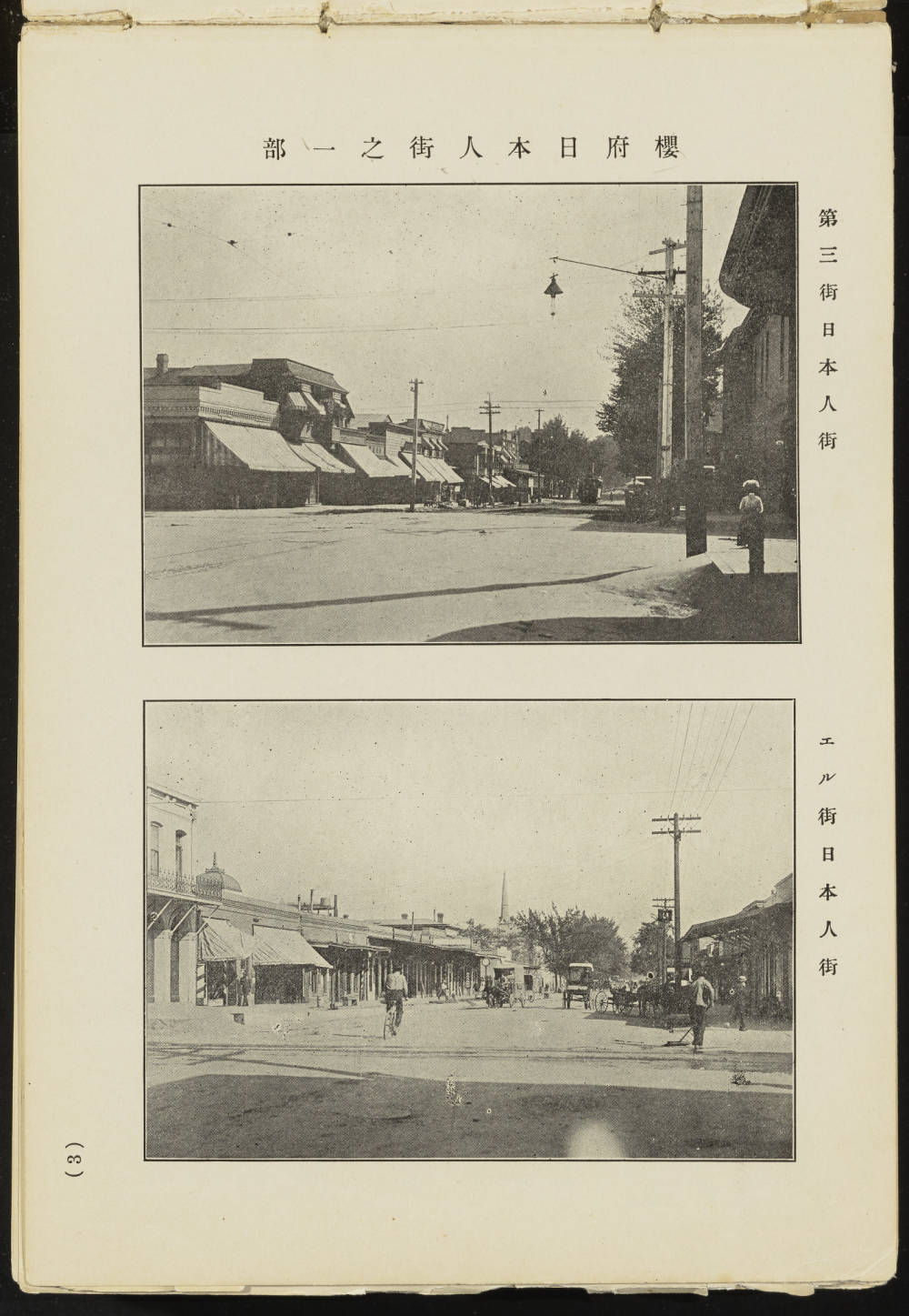
View of 3rd Street in "Sakura" c. 1911, photographed by Nichei Bei Times photographer for Ofu Heigen no nishiki (Brocade of Sacramento Valley)

Sacramento's Nihon Shōgakkō was established in 1903 for children of immigrant families whose parents worked in agriculture in the area. It was one of the earliest such Japanese language schools established in the United States, and the first class had 56 students. The school dormitory was located at the Young Men's Buddhist Association (YMBA) Hall adjacent to the Sacramento Buddhist Church. The YMBA was established in 1898 by the Buddhist Mission of North America, an organization representing the Jōdo Shinshū Buddhist tradition of Japan. The Sacramento Buddhist Church, organized in 1899 by the BMNA, is believed to be the second-oldest Buddhist institution in the United States. The buildings were located in the heart of Sacramento's Ofu, or Sakura City, which by the 1920s was the fourth-largest Japantown in the United States. A 1911 report on Asian communities on the west coast stated: "The Japanese supplementary school...is conducted by the Buddhist Mission. It is supported by the mission board and the Buddhist churches in Japan. However, it is not intended to give religious instruction. These children are taught Japanese history and geography and to read and write the language of their parents. Some of the children at the supplementary school are boarders, while others come from their homes in Sacramento. All of the children go to the public school during the regular hours and then the supplementary school from 3 to 5 p. m. Those who do not board pay 50 cents per month tuition, while the 27 who do board at the school pay this tuition fee and $7.50 per month for their maintenance."

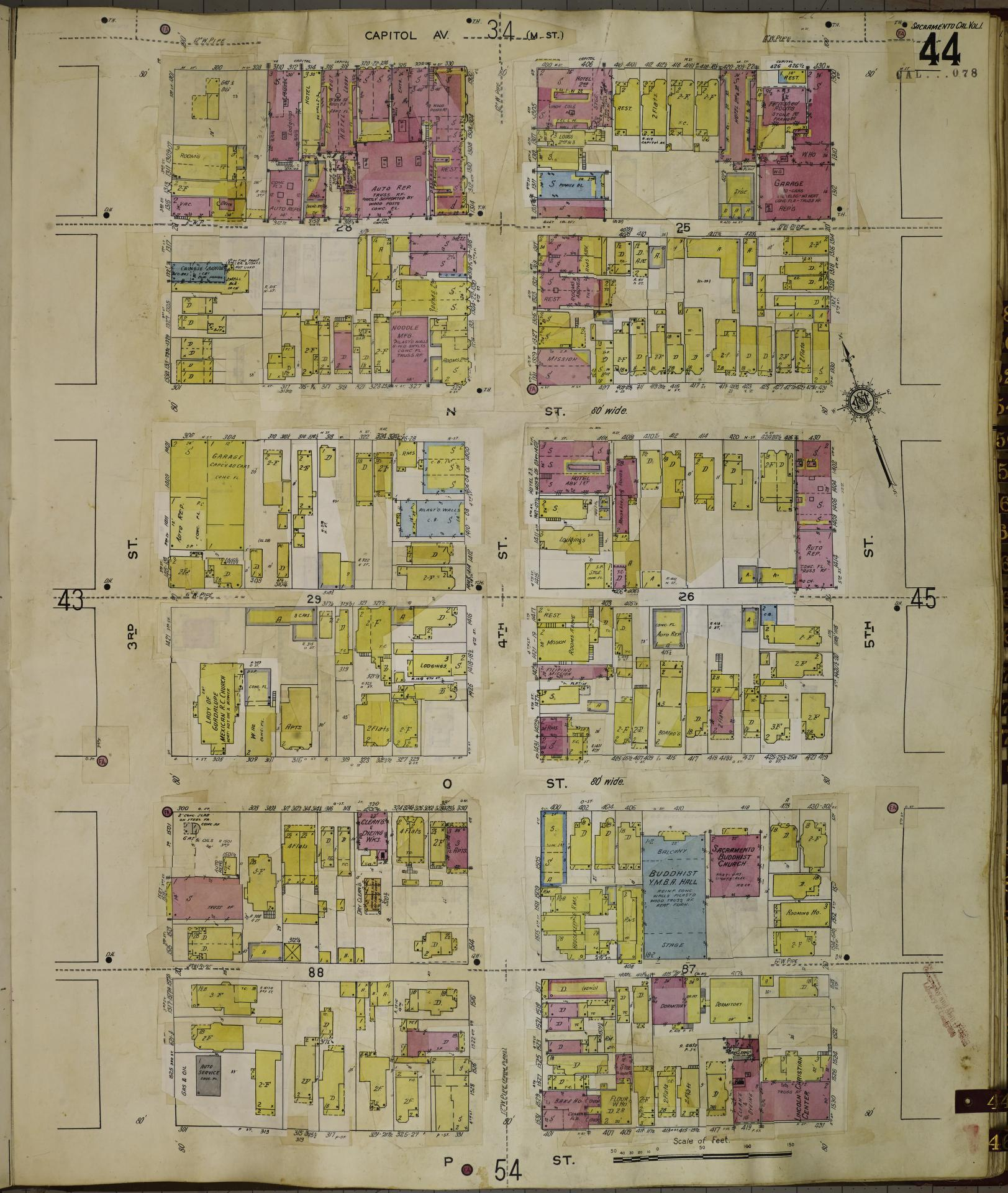
Buddhist YMBA Hall is the building colored blue in the block on the bottom right of this Sanborn fire insurance map created c. 1915; the Sacramento Buddhist Church is immediately adjacent

English-language newspapers covering the incident in 1923 usually called it the Japanese mission school fire or the Buddhist mission fire. Nihon Shōgakkō (Japanese: 日本小学校), meaning Japanese grammar school, is the name reported on the school's website. The school, which had 450 enrolled students at the time of Japanese-American internment, later changed its name to Sacramento Gakuen and still exists as of 2022 as Sakura Gakuen Japanese Language School.

== School fire ==
The Nihon Shōgakkō fire broke out shortly after midnight in the three-story wood-frame building located at 418 O Street, killing ten children. A Buddhist priest or teacher-caretaker named K. Kanada, and a visitor named Y. Yano, (Note: Yano was a projectionist from San Francisco who had been showing movies to the children earlier in the evening.) are credited with saving the thirteen children that survived. According to a contemporary news report, "Kanada made four trips down an outside stairway, each time carrying a child. Yano guided the other children through the smoke-filled hallways."

The day of the fire had been the "annual picnic of the Japanese in this county", celebrated in a grove in West Sacramento. One report said the ten victims had little chance of escape in part because they were unusually weary from a "long trip and picnic" earlier in the day.

The victims, who were said to have died from asphyxiation, were found on the second and third floors of the building; seven in a room on the third floor, two in one room on the second floor, and one in a different second-floor room. The victims ranged in age from five to seventeen, according to one report, or from seven to eighteen years of age, according to another. Two of the victims were brothers from Yolo County, California: K. Cage, age 18; and C. Cage, age 17.

Three days after the school fire, there was an attempt to burn down a Japanese boarding house two blocks away.

The dormitory was never rebuilt, but the fire-damaged Buddhist church building was replaced in 1925.

== Investigation ==
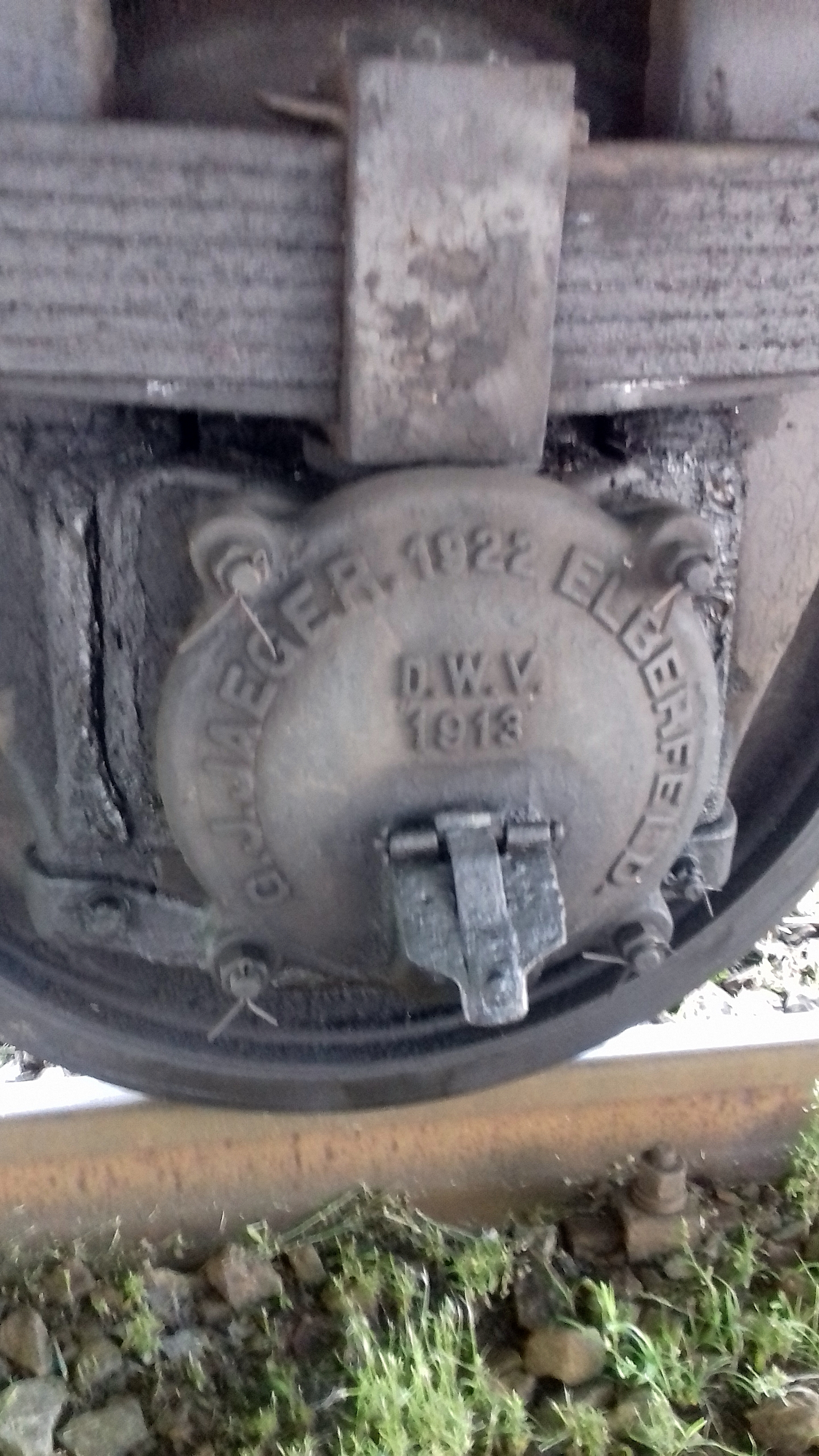
Journal box of a 1922 German-made rail car

Authorities initially believed the fire was a result of accidental combustion, despite the community's insistence from the beginning that the fire was of criminal origin. After moving forward with an arson theory, two men who were employees of the Southern Pacific shops in Sacramento, N. B. Coats, (Note: Name also rendered Coat and Coates.) a black man, and John Golden, a Mexican foundry worker, were initially charged, circa late April 1923, with starting the school fire. Coats had "broken down under severe grilling" and confessed that he had acted as a lookout while Golden, also known as "Mexican Pete" (last name sometimes listed as Gilden), lit the blaze. Golden was said to have been motivated by "hatred of the Japanese as a result of a quarrel with a Nipponese." Coats said Golden told him he "had no use for Japanese or Hindus." When other fires of suspicious origin continued to break out in Japanese-American neighborhoods, the headline was "Japs Victims of Arson Gang".

Three months later in Southern California, 25-year-old Fortunato Valencia Padilla (Note: Sometimes recorded as Fortuna or Frank) of El Paso, Texas, elsewhere described as "wandering Mexican", was arrested by police officers in Fullerton, Orange County, California, on July 17, 1923, following "a series of six fires there in one day." An individual matching his description was seen leaving two of the fires and attempting to enter a nearby residence. His shoeprints (including "a peculiar heel marking") matched those found at one of the buildings, and his hands and arms were covered with grease that matched the oily railroad waste that was used as a fire starter. Padilla was taken to Riverside and San Bernardino to "revisit scenes of recent fires" and signed a confession in the presence of four officers about events between June 29 and July 17. According to The Bakersfield Californian, Padilla gave investigators "the addresses of the buildings and in many cases details of how he set them." According to the Sacramento Bee, "While in jail in Fullerton it became necessary for Padilla to undergo an operation and he was taken to the country. While he was on the road to recovery he escaped by sawing his way through the wall of the hospital. He was captured a short time later in Santa Ana while he was securing some clothing from a party of Mexicans preparatory to making his flight."

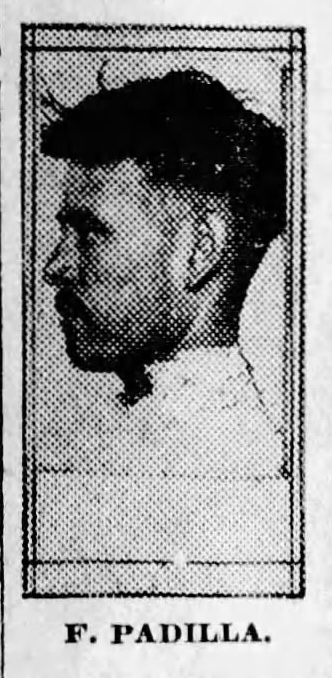
F. Padilla mug shot (Sacramento Bee, August 16, 1923)

Padilla confessed to police in Fullerton in mid-August 1923 to setting the fire at the school. He initially confessed to an undercover detective placed in his cell pretending to be a fellow prisoner jailed on burglary charges. Padilla reportedly told investigators that he had climbed a ledge between buildings and thrown the oil-soaked waste into a room of the school. He watched from below as the building burned and returned in the morning to watch the bodies being removed. In Sacramento, when Padilla was taken to the school site, "he held back as if he did not wish to approach the scene. Although he had admitted setting a fire at the address when McShane, Brown and the arson board agents took him to the scene he denied that it was the correct location and with scarcely a moment's thought directed his captors to another fire which he had set in a lodging house in this city on Fourth Street between N and O but of which the police had no knowledge."

Padilla later stated that he was "brutally beaten" while in custody of Fullerton police "in order to force him to affix his signature to a statement purporting to read that if he were taken to Fresno and Sacramento he would divulge information concerning alleged incendiary fires in the two cities." Orange County sheriffs and Fullerton city marshals strongly denied the allegations. Shortly after his confession, which was made with the assistance of a Spanish-language interpreter, a noose made from thinly braided strips of blanket was found in Padilla's cell.

Padilla ultimately confessed to dozens of fires—including several at fruit-packing warehouses—up and down the west coast of the United States, ranging from Seattle, Washington, to Orange County, California, beginning in 1921. Amongst his targets were at least 13 Japanese community homes, churches, missions or schools, with racial animus as motive. One report stated, "He was quoted as admitting satisfaction in burning the homes and buildings of Japanese, to which race he was said to have confessed an antipathy." Another stated, "He took particular joy in burning Japanese property because he says he doesn't like the Japanese. He told police he got a lot of joy out of watching the panic-stricken Japanese rushing from the burning buildings." Padilla's hate-crime arson fires were in Sacramento, Stockton, and Fresno. Other California arson fires set by Padilla were located in Colton, Anaheim, San Bernardino, and Riverside.

The fires set by Padilla cost an estimated US$5,000,000 (equivalent to $94,482,422 in 2025) of damage. Padilla used "oil-soaked waste materials from box car journals" (Note: In railroad car designs typical of the time, the journal box would have a hinged lid for easy access and be stuffed with waste rags to retain lubricating grease. Padilla would remove some of the grease-soaked rags for use as kindling in his fires.) of railroad freight cars to start most of the fires. One report stated that Padilla said he set fires because he wanted to "see the fire engines run."

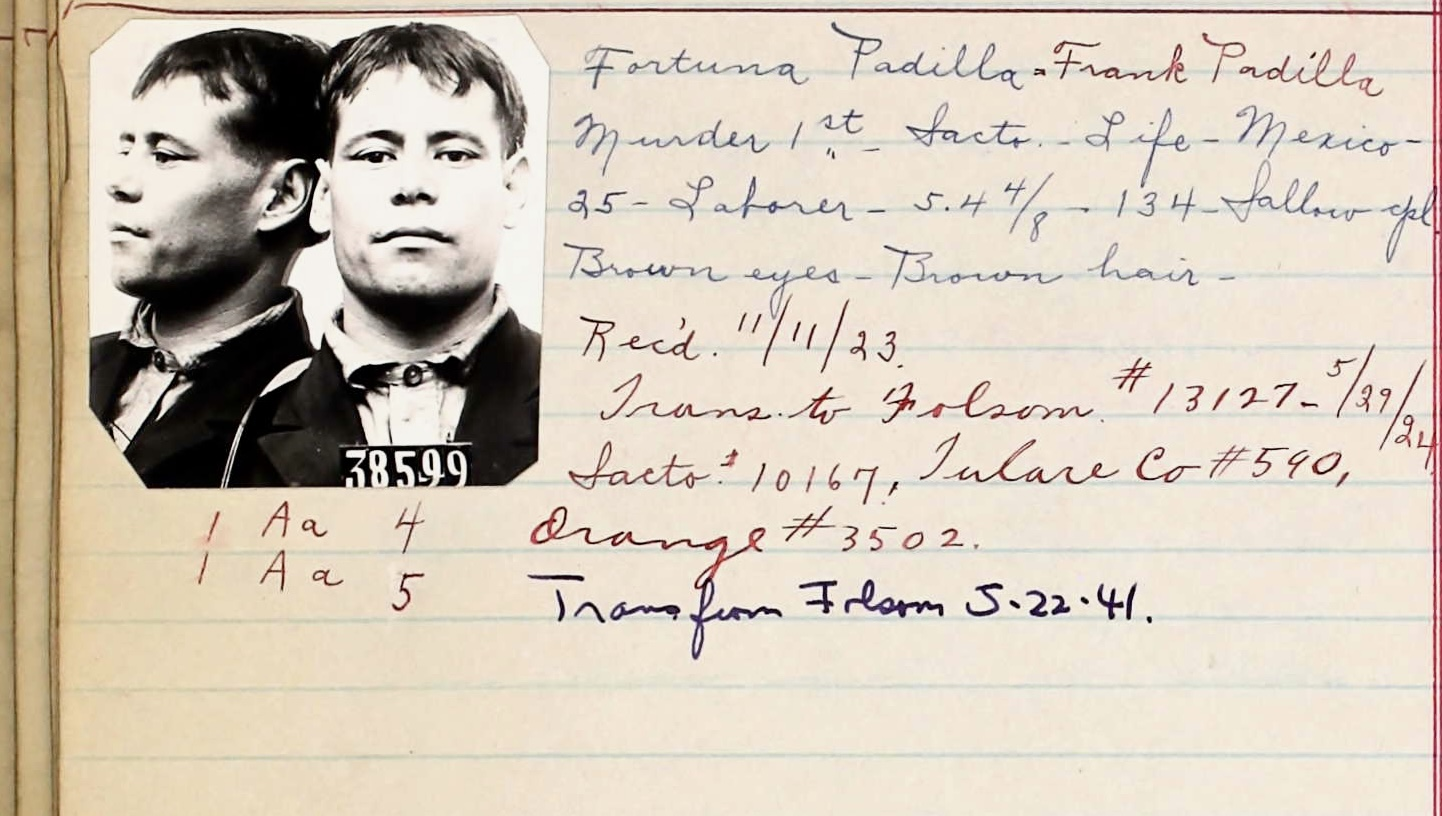
Fortuna Padilla mug shot and prison record

Padilla was indicted on first-degree murder charges for the school fire on September 1, 1923, in Sacramento. The prosecutor sought capital punishment in his opening statement when the trial began on October 31. After four hours of deliberation, the superior court jury returned a verdict of guilty on November 7, 1923, and recommended life imprisonment. Judge C. O. Busick sentenced him to life. His California state prison sentence start date was November 11, 1923. After his conviction, a Kings County prosecutor claimed that Padilla had confessed to being an agent of the International Workers of the World (IWW, also known as the Wobblies) "assigned to the duty of 'burning school houses, churches, raisin trays, and implements used in farm harvests," and assertion supposedly based on information "obtained from Thomas Mulhall, former deputy United States Marshal and now an Investigator for the Pacific Fire Underwriters." E. Oesterreicher, the undercover detective who initially gained Padilla's confidence and confession denied that Padilla had any connection to the IWW, stating that he had specifically interrogated Padilla about his organizational associations and Padilla denied affiliation with the IWW "and had no friends in it who would help, financially."

Padilla was a resident of Folsom State Prison at the time of the 1930 U.S. federal census, working as a driller in the quarry. His Folsom prisoner number was 13127. Padilla was incarcerated at San Quentin State Prison at the time of the 1950 U.S. federal census. His San Quentin prisoner number was 38599. He died in prison in San Bernardino County, California, in 1970. At the time of his death, Padilla was one of the longest-serving inmates in the state.

=== Other fires ===
Padilla's confessions included at least 25 fires in California. This record qualifies Padilla for the designation serial arsonist. This record also demonstrates instances of spree arson.

- January 16, 1921 – Three Japanese homes and a Japanese mission, Fresno
- April 26, 1922 – Two Japanese homes, Fresno
- May 30, 1922 – Madary Planing Mill, Fresno
- September 14, 1922 – Fig Brownie Plant of the California Peach and Fig Growers, Fresno
- October 8, 1922 – Japanese Congregational Mission, and Japanese home owned by S. Eda, previously burned on January 16, 1921, Fresno
- October 13, 1922 – Japanese-owned property, Fresno
- October 15, 1922 – Japanese-owned property, Fresno
- October 20, 1922 – Two Japanese-owned homes, Fresno
- November 13, 1922 – Japanese-owned public garage, Fresno
- April 26, 1923 – Two fires in the same night in the "Japanese quarter of Fresno"
- June 29, 1923 – Golden State Cannery in Colton, California
- June 1923 – Santa Fe lumberyard in San Bernardino, California; this fire was later described as "huge"
- July 1, 1923 – San Bernardino Lumber Yard (possibly same as previous)
- July 4, 1923 – Union Oil Company warehouse, Riverside
- July 5, 1923 – Superior Honey Company plant, Riverside
- July 10, 1923 – Anaheim Orange and Lemon Association packing warehouse, and Charles Bagnell warehouse, Anaheim
- July 11, 1923 – Americanization Teacher's Home, Placentia; American Fruit Growers packing house, Placentia; Orange Growers' warehouse, Anaheim; Placentia Walnut Growers' Association warehouse, Globe beach house, and a cottage, Fullerton
- Dates unclear – Three fires in Sacramento, including a lodging house on Fourth between N and O, a Japanese store at Third and M Streets, and an automobile standing at Fourth and O Streets
- Dates unclear: Rustic schoolhouse south of Hanford, and "raisin trays on the Dallas H. Gray ranch at Armona"

Padilla was said to have denied any connection with the blaze that consumed the Casa Blanca school near Riverside.

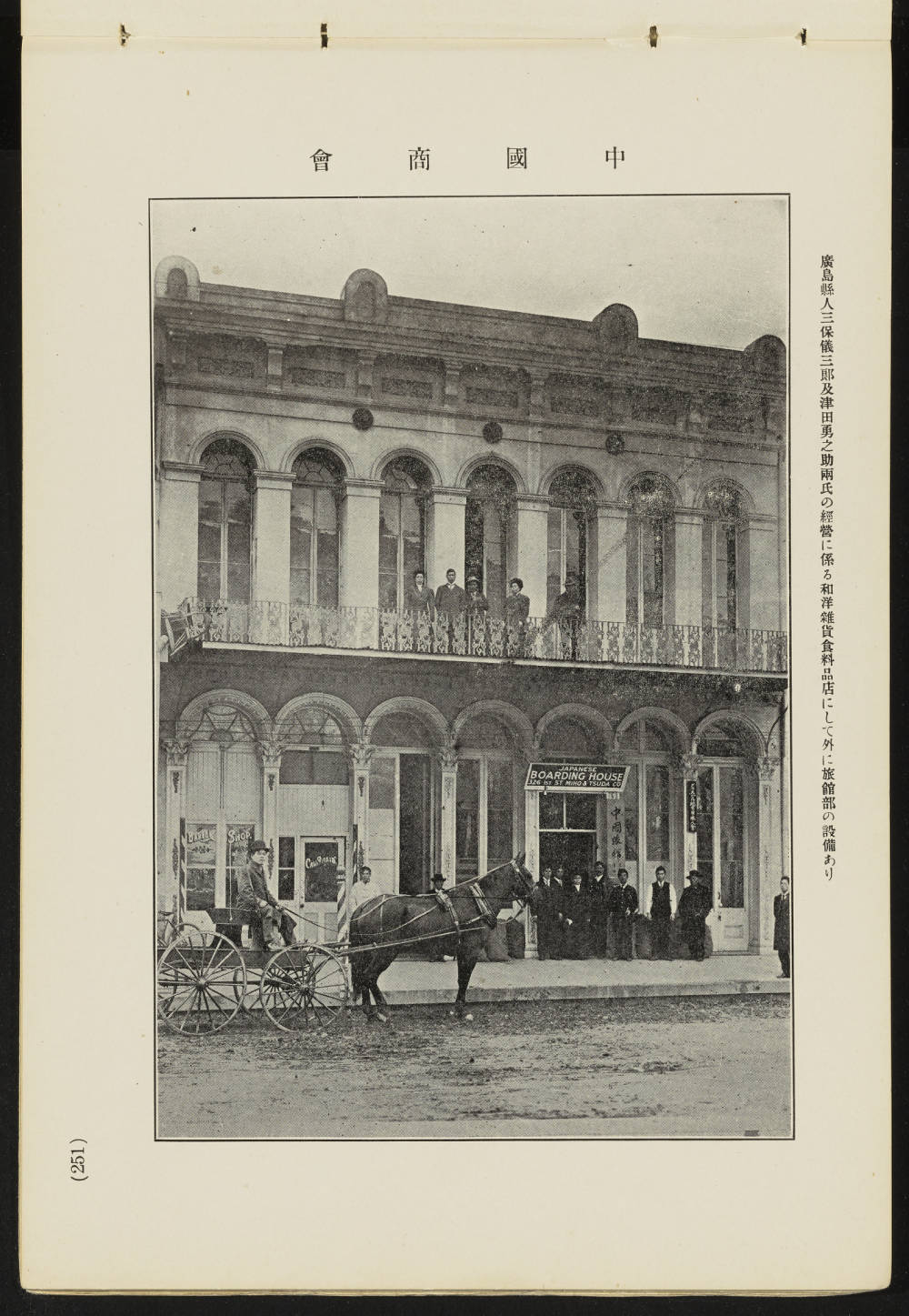
A boarding house in the Japanese quarter of a city in the Sacramento valley c. 1911, perhaps similar to the ones ignited by Padilla in 1923

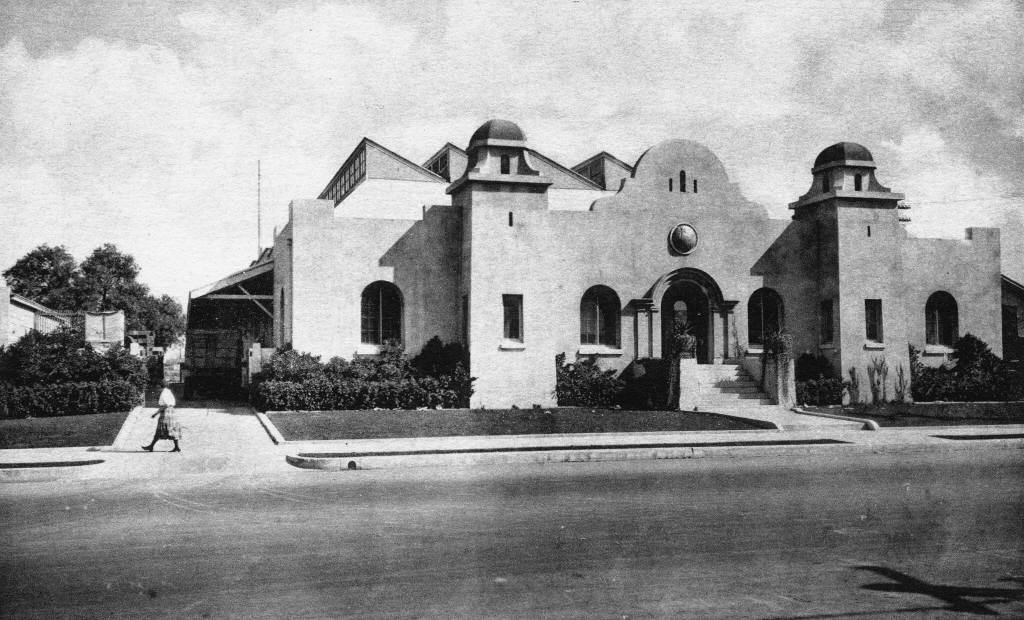
Anaheim Orange and Lemon Association packing warehouse, pictured 1936, still stands and serves a food hall and historic landmark in downtown Anaheim

=== Perpetrator ===
Fortunato Valencia Padilla (October 14, 1897 or 1898 – August 20, 1970), sometimes recorded as Frank Padilla or Fortuna Padilla, was from the Rio Grande Valley. The 1930 census records his father's birthplace as Texas and his mother's as Mexico.

Padilla registered for the draft in Cochise County, Arizona. His middle name was recorded as Balancia on his draft card, home address 432 Canal Street, El Paso. He said his father was born in El Paso, and his nearest relative was Señora Padilla of Ysleta, El Paso, Texas. According to newspaper reports he was in the United States Army during World War I but deserted.

According to his Folsom prison identification card, his criminal record was as prisoner AS No. 5332 at Arizona State Penitentiary. Identifying "marks, scars and moles" were "hypo mks left arm." According to newspaper reports, he had a past burglary charge.

Padilla died in San Bernardino County, California.

== See also ==
- Babbs Switch fire (1924)
- Cleveland School fire (1923)
- Farrington v. Tokushige 273 U.S. 284 (1927)
- Hongwangji Buddhism
- Gentlemen's Agreement of 1907
- Immigration Act of 1924
- Hope Development School fire (1924)
- Hoshū jugyō kō
- Japanese language education in the United States
  - Kinmon Gakuen (San Francisco)
  - Nihon Go Gakko (Seattle)
  - Nihongo Gakko (Tacoma)
