= Sylvester Jordan =

German politician and lawyer

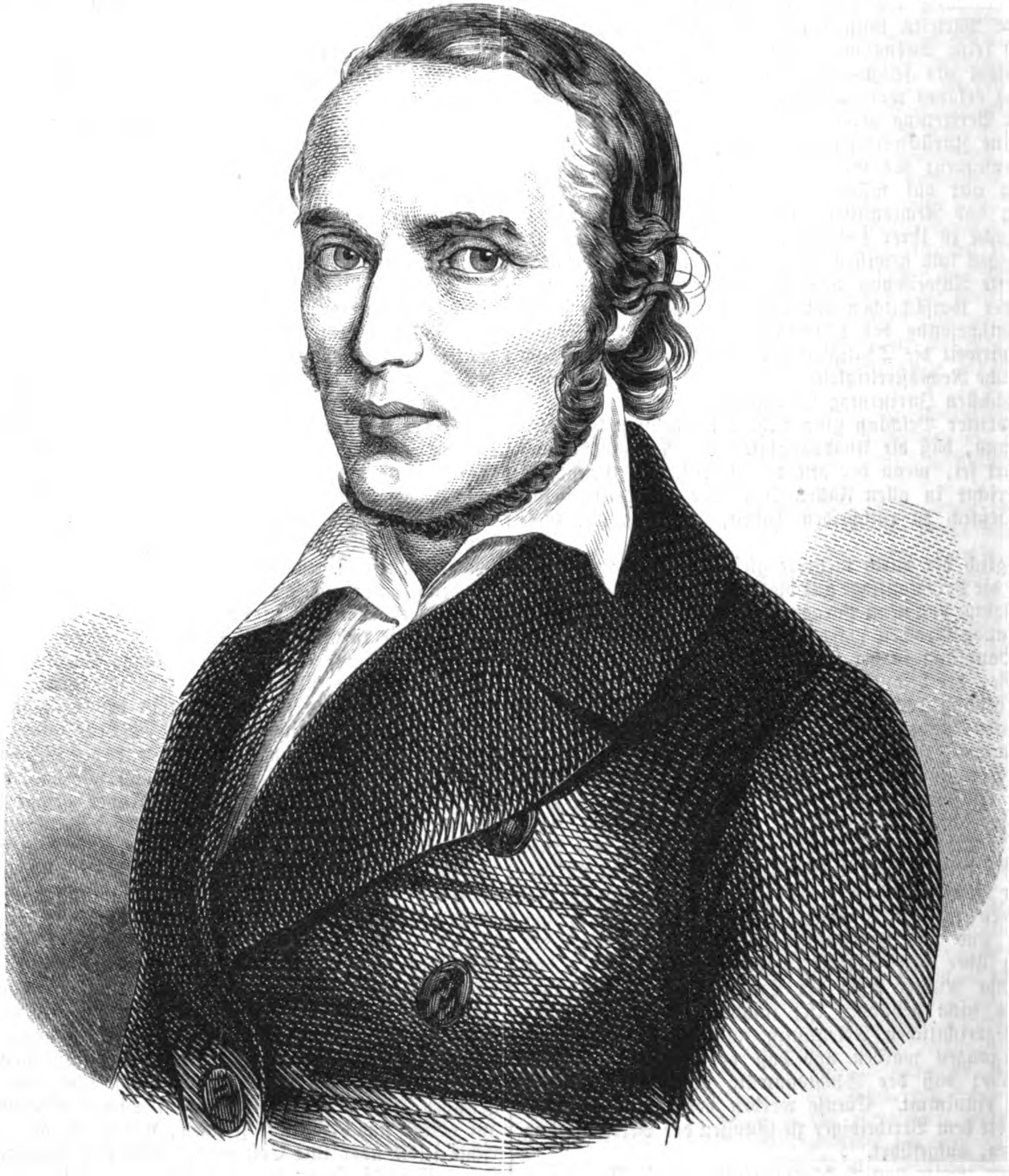
Sylvester Jordan.

Franz Sylvester Jordan (1792–1861) was a German politician and lawyer.

Born on 30 December 1792 in Omes, near Axams in Austria, Jordan went to school at the Wilhelmsgymnasium in Munich. After studying jurisprudence and cameralism at the universities of Vienna and Landshut, he became a professor of constitutional law at the University of Marburg in 1821.

Jordan contributed significantly to the drafting of the constitution of 1830 and thus the creation of the Hessian Diet. However, he got into conflict with the state government and was placed under police surveillance. He was arrested in 1839 under suspicion of being part of the Frankfurter Wachensturm six years earlier and was later sentenced to five years in prison. After two years in prison in Marburg, the supreme court of appeal in Kassel lifted the ruling and Jordan was freed.

Jordan served 10 months as a member of the Frankfurt Parliament between 18 July 1848 and 20 May 1849. He died on 15 April 1861 in Kassel.
