= Ysätters-Kajsa =

Mythical creature of Närke, Sweden

Ysätters-Kajsa was a wind-troll that people in the Swedish province of Närke used to believe in; probably the only one of her kind in Scandinavia.

The Swedish writer Selma Lagerlöf immortalised Ysätters-Kajsa in the first part of Chapter 24 of her famous novel The Wonderful Adventures of Nils (1906–1907). She wrote that in the Swedish province of Närke, in the old days, there lived a troll named Ysätters-Kajsa. She was named Kajsa because wind-trolls used to be called by that name. Her cognomen Ysätter came from the swamp Ysätter (59°08′N 15°33′E) in Asker parish where she lived. She appeared to have lived in Asker parish, but she played jokes on people all over Närke and was unique to that region.

== Portrayal by Lagerlöf ==
Ysätters-Kajsa was not a dark and gloomy troll, but a happy and playful one. What she liked most was a real gale. As soon as there was enough wind she would leave her home to go dance on the Närke flatland. Närke is essentially nothing but a flatland surrounded by woody hills. It is only in the north-eastern corner where we find Hjälmaren that there is an aperture.

Whenever the winds would summon their forces on the Baltic Sea and rush into the hinterland, they would first rush unimpeded across the hills of Södermanland into Närke. At Närke they would then collide with the ridge of Kilsbergen, which would turn the winds southwards, where they would then collide with Tiveden, which would direct them eastwards to collide with Tylöskog. They would then rush northwards to collide with Käglan, turning the winds westwards again towards Kilsbergen, and so on. The winds would circulate in this manner in smaller and smaller circles until there was nothing left but a whirlwind on the plain.

Ysätters-Kajsa enjoyed herself the most whenever those whirlwinds rushed over the plain. She would then stand in the centre of the whirlwind. Her long hair would whirl among the clouds, while her skirt would drag on the ground like a dust storm. The whole plain under her was like her own private dance floor.

In the mornings, Ysätters-Kajsa used to sit up on a high Scots Pine on the top of a high cliff and look out on the plain. If it was winter and the snow allowed sleighs to move about, she could see many people traveling on the plain from this vantage point. Then she would start a real storm and create snow drifts so high that people could hardly get home in the evening. If it were summer and good weather for loading the dry hay on the fields, she would wait until after the first carts had been fully loaded and then rush in with a few rains which would put an end to the farmer's working day.

She rarely thought of anything besides making mischief. The colliers in Kilsbergen were afraid to go to sleep because as soon as she saw an unguarded charcoal kiln, she would sneak in and puff on the fire so that it would start burning brightly. If the ore transporters were late transporting their ore from Laxå and Svartå, Ysätters-Kajsa would create so much dark fog that both people and horses would get lost and end up driving into nearby marshes and swamps.

If the vicar's wife in Glanshammar had prepared afternoon coffee in her garden a Sunday in the summer and a breeze came up which lifted the table cloth and dumped the cups and plates on the ground, then everyone knew who was to blame. Also, if the hat of the mayor in Örebro suddenly blew off his head and he was seen running across the town square, or if small cargo boats laden with vegetables of the people of the island of Vinön hit a shoal in lake Hjälmaren, or if laundry hanging out to dry blew away and was then found heaped with dust, or if smoke blew into the houses without warning some evening, then it was easy for the people of Närke to guess to who was out having a good time.

In spite of the fact that Ysätters-Kajsa loved creating mischief, she was not bad to the bone. People noticed that she was hardest on people who were quarrelsome, mean and wicked, but she would often take honest folks and small poor children into her care. Old people used to say that once, when the church of Asker was burning, Ysätters-Kajsa came, nestled herself among the smoke and fire on the roof of the church, and put it out.

In many cases the people of Närke had become quite tired of the wind-troll, but on the other hand she never got tired of causing trouble for the people of Närke. Whenever she was sitting on the top of a cloud watching Närke, which lay under her with its affluence and wealth of prominent homesteads on the plain and rich mines and ironworks in the hills, with its turbid Svartån River, and saw the shallow lakes of the Närke plain that were so rich in fish, and looked over the old borough of Örebro surrounding a grave, old castle with its sturdy towers, she must have thought: "The people would be much too well off, if it were not for me. I shake them up a bit and keep them happy." Then she would laugh loudly and tauntingly like a magpie, and whirl away, dancing and whirling from one corner of the plain to another. Whenever a farmer saw her running in a trail of dust over the plain, he could not help smiling, because however teasing and naughty she could be, she had a good temper. It was also just as refreshing for the farmers to deal with the troll, as it was for the plain to be whipped by the storm.

Lagerlöf finishes her presentation of the troll by saying: "Nowadays, people claim that Ysätters-Kajsa is dead and gone, like all other trolls, but such things are almost impossible to believe. It is just as if someone would say that the air would be still on the plains and the wind would no more dance over it with whistling and roars and fresh air and downpours."
