= Qaysa =

- Municipality
- Location within Azerbaijan Location within Shaki-Zagatala Economic Region
- Coordinates: 41°42′21″N 46°13′43″E
- Country: Azerbaijan
- Rayon: Balakan

Population
  - Total: 3,595
- Time zone: UTC+4 (AZT)
  - Summer (DST): UTC+5 (AZT)

Qaysa (also, Kaysa and Koysa) is a village and municipality in the Balakan Rayon of Azerbaijan. It has a population of 3,595. The municipality consists of the villages of Qaysa and Abjit.
