= Venice–Playa del Rey Line =

Pacific Electric streetcar line (1905–1936)

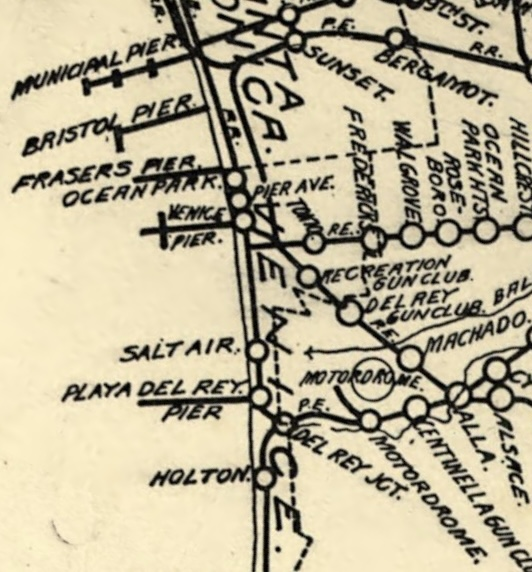
- Route of Venice–Playa del Rey Line (1912)

Overview
- Termini: Playa del Rey; Venice

Service
- Type: Interurban
- System: Pacific Electric
- Operator(s): Pacific Electric

History
- Opened: 1905
- Closed: July 13, 1936

Technical
- Track gauge: 1,435 mm (4 ft 8 1/2 in) standard gauge
- Electrification: Overhead line, 600 V DC

The Venice–Playa del Rey Line was a streetcar line of the Pacific Electric. It operated along the Pacific Ocean between Playa del Rey and Venice, California. It was also referred to as the Lagoon Line.

Tracks connecting to the Redondo Beach via Playa del Rey Line were built by the Los Angeles Pacific Railroad in 1905. At the time of the Great Merger of 1911, the line was through-routed with the Third Street Local line in Santa Monica. Briefly in 1916, the line was operated as an extension of the Santa Monica via Beverly Hills Line, providing service through to Downtown Los Angeles. This was quickly replaced with independent cars operated between Playa del Rey and the corner of Pacific and Windward. Service along the line was abandoned on July 13, 1936.
