= Kaisa Leka =

Finnish artist (born 1978)

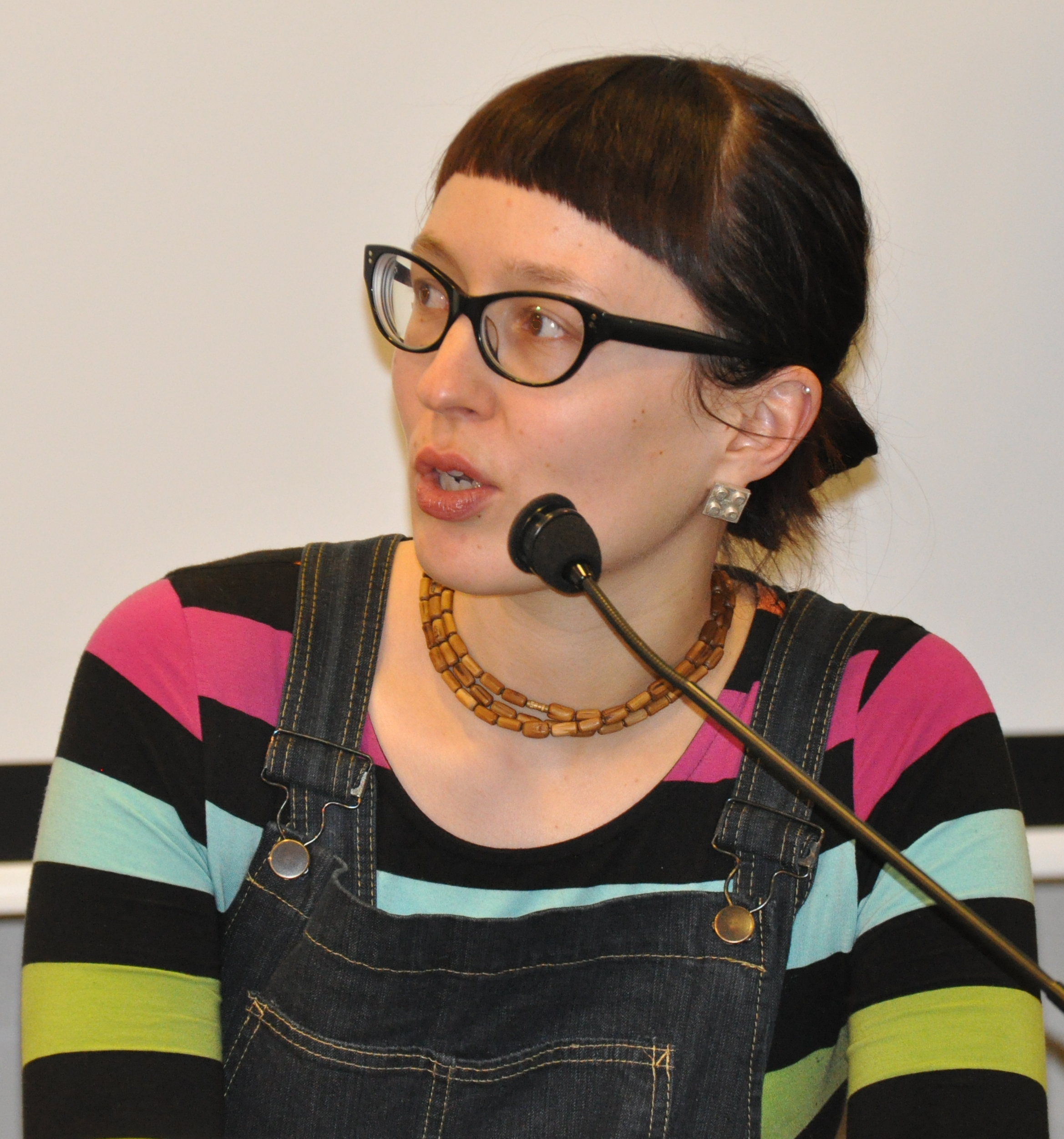
- Kaisa Leka in 2011
- Born: Kaisa Maria Leka; October 25, 1978 (age 47); Lahti, Southern Finland
- Education: Lahti University of Applied Sciences.
- Known for: comic artist, graphic designer
- Notable work: I am not these feet (2003); Your name is Krishangi (2004)
- Website: Kaisa Leka

Kaisa Maria Leka (born October 25, 1978) is a Finnish comic artist and politician from Porvoo. Central themes in Leka's autobiographical comics are disability, politics and spiritual searching. Her comics figures are naïvistically simple animals, the most important of which is a mouse, representing Kaisa herself.

== Publications and other works ==
=== Current career as an artist ===
Kaisa Leka, works with graphic design as well as comics, mostly layout, for instance for a vegetarian cookbook put together by the Green party's presidential candidate for the 2006 election. Leka has also written a small book about India published by the Helsinki City Art Museum. Along with complete personal works Leka has worked for several magazines and done different smaller projects for a variety of clients. Leka also regularly teaches comics courses and workshops in many different schools. In 2012 she was given the Finnish Comics Society's Puupäähattu award, the most prestigious Finnish award for comic artist. The same year she was also given the Cyclist of the Year Award for the work she's done to promote cycling and cycle travel.

=== Publications ===
Leka has published several autobiographical comic books, the most well-known being the 60-page I am not these feet from 2003, a diary about learning to walk again after her amputations. It has been translated to French and Italian. In 2004 Leka published Your name is Krishangi, a travel diary from a honeymoon that took an unexpected turn when she and her husband visited a Hindu monastic in the California redwoods. A small comic in two parts named Two stories was published in 2005, and describes a week she spent home alone while her husband was in Ukraine - from both Leka's husband's point of view and Leka's point of view. On the Outside Looking in, published in 2006 deals with Kaisa's childhood and Audarya-Lila, published in 2009, a Finnish friend who moved to Northern California to become a Hindu monk. Leka's two newest books, the 476-page Tour d'Europe (2010) and 288-page Expedition no 3 (2012) describe long cycling trips she's made with her husband.

Leka's comics have also been published in several Finnish magazines, daily newspapers as well as weekly and monthly magazines. The themes are the same even though the format varies: spirituality, disability and politics. Leka's comics have been included in several group exhibitions in Finland, and also at the book fair in Moscow, Russia and comic festival in Amiens, France.

=== Filmography ===
In 2004 as part of her graduate studies at Kemi-Tornio polytechnic Marika Väisänen worked on a short 26min documentary film entitled Koko nainen - Whole woman about Kaisa Leka. It was awarded best student documentary film in one of the biggest short film festivals in Finland. Koko nainen - Whole woman is a documentary portrait about Kaisa, who openly discusses her relationship to her body and the meaning of corporality. After a childhood disrupted by agonising medical procedures, Kaisa had both legs amputated beneath the knee. Now she wears only skirts, drawing attention to the artificial legs that are her statement of identity. She doesn't want to hide her disability but rather show it with pride. How is it to be a disabled woman in a society obsessed with appearances?

Title	Produced by	Directed by	Music by	Format	Length	Year	Country	Awards
Koko nainen (Whole Woman)	Marika Väisänen	Marika Väisänen	Emmi Knuutinen		24 min	2004	Finland	2005 Hannover Film Festival - Best Student Documentary
