= Fernando Pessa =

Portuguese journalist and reporter

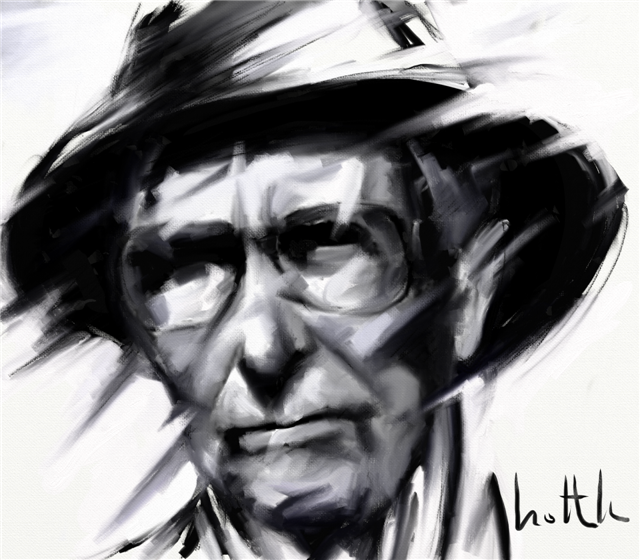
Fernando Pessa, died on April 29, 2002, in Lisbon, Portugal.

Fernando Pessa, ComIH, GOM, OBE (April 15, 1902 – April 29, 2002) was a Portuguese journalist and reporter. Early in 2002, Pessa was hailed as the world's oldest journalist.

== Biography ==
He joined Portugal's state radio in 1934, and covered World War II for BBC radio, for which he was subsequently appointed an Officer of the Order of the British Empire by King George VI. On March 7, 1957, Pessa made the first live television transmission of the Portuguese Radio and Television service. He was married to Simone Alice Roufier. He died on April 29, 2002, in Lisbon, Portugal, shortly after his 100th birthday.

== Filmography ==
- The Boys from Brazil (1978) - German Officer at Party (uncredited)
- Lionheart (1987)
- La gamine (1992)
