= Gurgen Boryan =

- Born: June 20, 1915; Shusha, Nagorno-Karabakh Republic
- Died: April 15, 1971 (aged 55); Yerevan, Soviet Armenia
- Occupations: Poet, writer, playwright

Gurgen Mikayeli Boryan (Armenian: Գուրգեն Միքայելի Բորյան; 20 June 1915 – 15 April 1971), was an Armenian poet and playwright.

== Biography ==
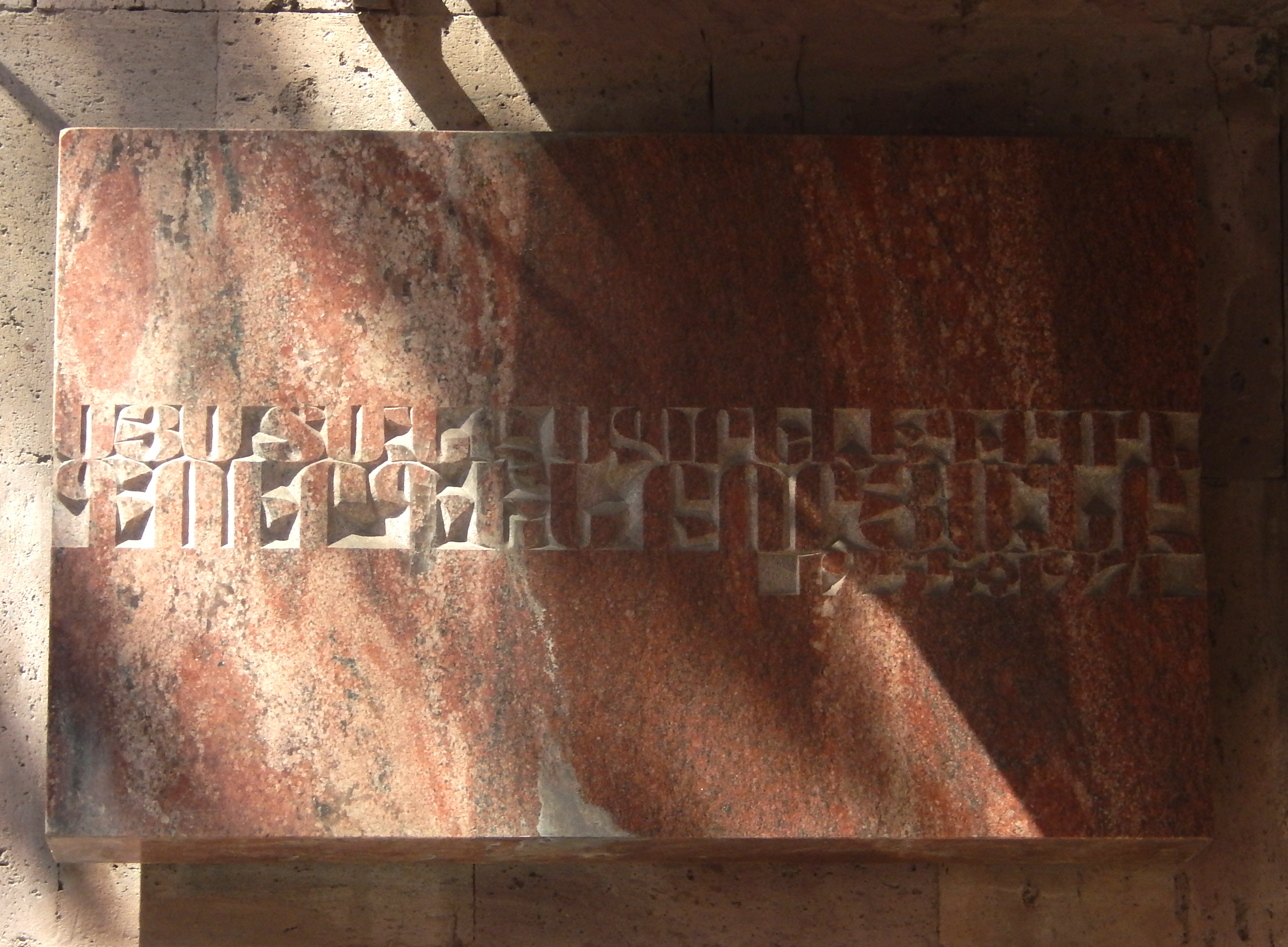
Plaque for Gurgen Boryan on Teryan street, Yerevan

Boryan was born in Shusha. He started his career of writer in 1930, and published his first collection of poems in 1937. He was the author of several poetry collections - "The way to the sea" (1940), "Selected works" (1953), "Poems" (1954); poetry for children ("Yes and no", 1955), "Under the same roof" (1957), "House on the roads" plays produced by Sundukian Theatre of Yerevan. He died in Yerevan.

"Saroyan brothers" film by Armenfilm is based on Boryan's well-known play.
