= Kaisa Roose =

Estonian conductor

Kaisa Roose (Music Conductor) was born in Tallinn, Estonia on 15 April 1969. At the age of six she began studying piano at the Tallinn School of Music. In 1987 she was admitted to the Tallinn Conservatoire, where she studied choir conducting, taking her degree in 1992. The following year Kaisa Roose was admitted to The Royal Danish Academy of Music in Copenhagen, where she studied orchestra conducting. She completed the postgraduate soloist course in 1997 by giving her debut concert with the Danish Odense Symphony Orchestra. The same year Kaisa Roose was awarded the Grethe Kolbe Grant for promising young conductors.

The Royal Danish Theatre in Copenhagen engaged Kaisa Roose at the age of 28 to perform a modern ballet written by Kim Helweg, "Cupid and Psyche" ("Amor og Psyke"). Her success in this was a turning point in her career that led to a three-year contract as a conductor at the Theater.

During her career, Kaisa Roose has conducted all the Danish regional orchestras as well as orchestras in Sweden, Finland, Italy and Costa Rica. From 2000 through the following three seasons she was with Malmö Opera and Music Theatre in Sweden. During her first season there, she premiered the contemporary Swedish opera "Portrait", written by Catharina Backman and Maria Sundqvist and conducted the musicals "Kaspar Hauser" and "Miss Saigon".

Interest in contemporary music has brought Kaisa Roose to close collaboration with different new music ensembles such as The Esbjerg Ensemble, The Figura, and The Ensemble 2000. In January 2004, Ms.Roose conducted the world premiere and recorded with The Esbjerg Ensemble Per Nørgård's "Gennem torne" and The Harp Concerto (Soloist Tina Rehling ).

In the spring 2004 Kaisa Roose made her debut in the Baltic countries. She conducted Edvard Grieg's Peer Gynt Suite nr.1, Antonín Dvořák's Cello Concerto and Beethoven's Seventh Symphony with the Estonian National Symphony Orchestra and Elgar's Violin Concerto and Gabriel Fauré's Requiem with the Lithuanian State Symphony Orchestra.

In 2014, Kaisa Roose made her debut with the Brussels Philharmonic Orchestra in the concert hall of the Philharmonie de Paris, performing Karlheinz Stockhausen's Carré

Kaisa Roose has collaborated with international soloists performing concerts with, among others, guitarist Jakob Bangsø from Denmark, violinist Ana María Valderrama from Spain, oboist Eva Kruse Steinaa from Denmark and cellist Franz Ortner from Austria

== Discography ==
- 2006 - Per Nørgård: Works for Harp and Ensemble
- 2007 - Hans-Henrik Nordstrøm: Finnegan's / Nuagess d'automne / Drommespor II / In the Woods 2007
- 2020 - Corigliano, Caravassilis, Siegel: Guitar Concertos - Jakob Bangso
