= Kaisa Pöyry =

Finnish herbalist, cunning woman (1818–1892)

Kaisa Pöyry (1818–1892), was a Finnish herbalist and was also called a witch or a wise old woman. She was based in Ristiina and Savolax, but it was widely reputed that she attracted clients from large parts of Finland. Ristiina was even called "Kaisa Pöyry's keeper" because of her reputation.

== Biography ==
She was born Katarina Wanqvist in 1818 on the Sairila riding farm on the Mikkeli side. Her parents were Martti Wanqvist and Christian-born Anna Hokkanen. Pöyry came from modest circumstances and spent a large part of her life working as a maid in Ristina. She had learned the art of healing, which is believed to have come from her Lappish itinerant husband. Kaisa had a child in 1848 with this itinerant man and because of that got into legal trouble, accused of secret intercourse.

There is no exact information in Pöyry's life as to when she started divination and medicine, but such activities were locally considered to be very suspicious and dangerous at the time.

On 17 September 1858, the Suometar newspaper wrote about an event where it was mentioned that a person had appeared in the middle of the keep, who claimed to know everything and to whom the young girls went to talk to about their longings. In addition to this, help was sought from her for natural accidents and illnesses. This attracted the attention of the locals and she was ordered to be summoned to the betrothal court. However, Pöyry didn't end up in court because of her treatments, but because, on one holy day, in the aisles of Ristiina's church, in the middle of the priest's sermon, she used cards to prophesy to those sitting next to her. This event led to her being brought to trial at the Autumn Sessions in 1858.

Pop art and mysticism also characterized Pöyry's treatment methods. She practiced arcane healing, performing rituals and spells hidden from prying eyes. Pöyry is said to have read spells in the dim light of the smoker or in the kitchen of the house, using them for example in connection with rye, butter and eggs. Although she used such spiritual means, she did not limit herself to spells alone in her healing work. She also made use of medicinal substances provided by nature and treatment methods that had earned her trust.

Pöyry was known as a petite woman with dark hair and dark eyes. At the age of 42, she married Hesekiel Hiski Hermanninpoika Torniainen, the coachman's brother from the village of Liikala in Ristiina, in 1860. It is possible that Hiski Torniainen was related to Pöyry. After Torniainen died in 1880, Pöyry moved in with her son and shared her healing skills with her daughter-in-law Hedda Helena Väisänen, who may also have been a relative of Pöyry. Väisänen continued to work magic in Ristiina.

A street in Ristina is named after Kaisa Pöyry.

Pöyry died at the age of 73, suffering from "anxiety disease".
