= Cleveland School fire =

1923 fire in Camden, South Carolina, US

Coordinates: 34°12′42.6″N 80°31′18.9″W

- The school as it appeared before the fire
- Date: May 17, 1923
- Location: Camden, South Carolina, US
- Deaths: 77

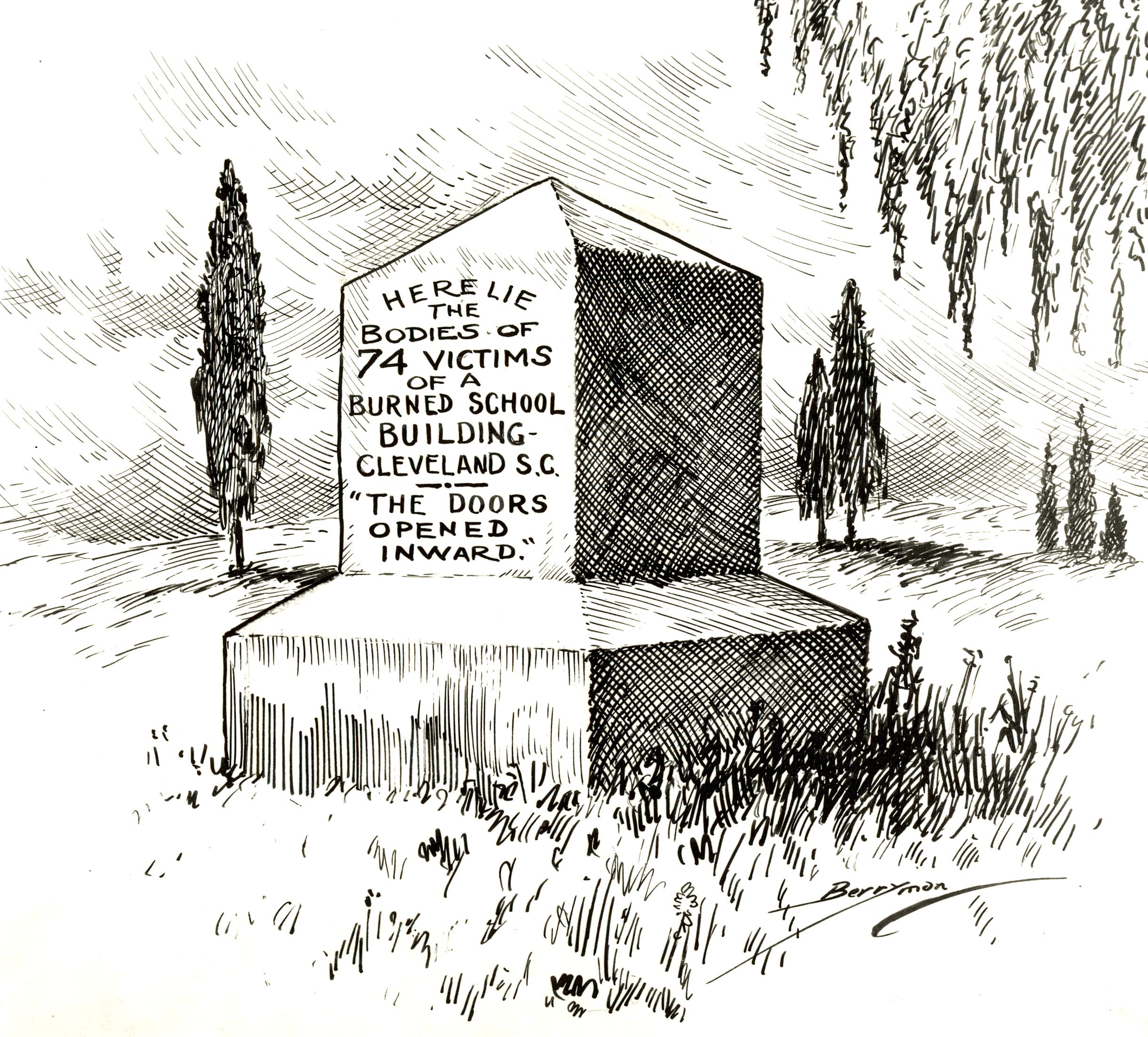
1923 drawing

The Cleveland School fire was the fourth-deadliest school fire or explosion in American history and the deadliest fire in South Carolina history. It occurred near Camden, South Carolina, on May 17, 1923, during a school play, killing 77 people.

== Background ==
The two-story school was located 6 mi (9.7 km) southeast of Camden, South Carolina, and served students at all grade levels. The school was constructed primarily out of wood and was lighted only with oil lamps. Two classrooms were located on the first floor, while an auditorium was located on the second floor. A single wooden stairway provided the only access to the second floor.

The school was scheduled to close at the end of the 1922–1923 school year.

== The fire ==
On May 17, 1923, the day the school was scheduled to close permanently, around 300 people were attending a play in the school's auditorium that took place after the annual graduation ceremony. The play was a short comedy called either Miss Topsy Turvy or Topsy Turvy.

During the play's last act, an oil lamp fell from the wall, causing its contents to spill all over the stage and ignite. A group of men attempted to smother the flames with their coats but were unsuccessful. The fire eventually traveled up the stage's curtains and then spread rapidly across the ceiling, causing a panic. Spectators rushed towards the stairway to escape. However, many people were trampled to death at the door to the stairs because the door was so narrow.

Others died of smoke inhalation before the flames could reach them. The spectators' excess weight also caused the stairway to collapse, trapping those inside on the second floor of the building. Many of these people survived by jumping out of the school's windows. The school was completely destroyed within an hour.

== Victims ==
Seventy-seven people perished in the fire, including forty-one children and the father of future governor of South Carolina, John C. West. Only about one-quarter of the victims could be identified. Those that were not claimed by family members were buried in a mass grave at the Beulah Methodist Church Cemetery.
