= List of coupled cousins =

First cousin marriages

This is a list of notable individuals who have been romantically or maritally coupled with a full first cousin.

Worldwide, more than ten percent of marriages are between first or second cousins.

Cousin marriage is an important subject in sociology, anthropology, and alliance theory.

== Notable people ==
A

- Edwin Abbott (1808–1882), English educator, and his first cousin, Jane Abbott (1806–1882)
- Samuel Abravanel (1473–1551), Sephardic-Italian financier, and his first cousin, Benvenida Abrabanel (c. 1473 – c. 1560s), philanthropist and businesswoman
- Abu al-As ibn al-Rabi' (d. 634), son-in-law and Companion of Muhammad, and his first cousin Zainab bint Muhammad (600–629)
- Julius Adam (1852–1913), German painter, and his first cousin, Amalie Adam
- John Adams II (1803–1834), American government functionary and businessman, and his first cousin, Mary Catherine Hellen
- Pedro Aguirre Cerda (1879–1941), Chilean president, and his first cousin, Juana Rosa Aguirre (1877–1962)
- Ali ibn Husayn Zayn al-Abidin (c. 659 – c. 713), grandson of Ali ibn Abi Talib, and his first cousin, Fatimah bint Hasan
- Lewis F. Allen (1800–1890) and his first cousin, Margaret Cleveland.
- Mark Antony (83 BC - 30 BC) and his first cousin, Antonia Hybrida Minor

B

- Josiah Bartlett (1729–1795), second signer of the United States Declaration of Independence, and his first cousin, Mary Bartlett
- Sir Rowland Blennerhassett, 1st Baronet (1741-1821) and his first cousin, Millicent Agnes Yielding
- Ilsley Boone (1879–1968) and his first cousin, Ella Murray "Mae" Boone, founder of the American Sunbathing Association, which today is known as the American Association for Nude Recreation
- James Boswell (1740–95), biographer of Samuel Johnson, and his first cousin Margaret Montgomerie (1738-1789) married in 1769.
- Christine Boutin (b. 1944), French politician and her first cousin, Louis Boutin
- Boverianda Nanjamma and Chinnappa (the family name is Boverianda), Indian translators and scholars, were first cousins and a married couple. Both were the grandchildren of compiler Nadikerianda Chinnappa (1875-1931); Nanjamma was his son's daughter and Boverianda Chinnappa was Nadikerianda Chinnappa's daughter's son.
- Wernher von Braun (1912–1977) and his first cousin, Maria Luise von Quistorp
- Charles Bulfinch (1763–1844), American architect, and his first cousin, Hannah Apthorp

C

- George Cayley (1831–1895), British cricketer, and his first cousin, Catherine Louisa Worsley
- Quintus Caecilius Metellus Celer (c. 104 BC - 59 BC) and his first cousin, Clodia (c. 95 BC - after 45 BC)
- Fuad Char (born 1937), Colombian politician, and his first cousin, Adela Chaljub Char
- Burwell Colbert (1783–1862), freed American former enslaved person, and his first cousin, Critta Hemings
- Henry Nelson Coleridge (1798–1843) and his first cousin, Sara Coleridge (1802-1852)

D

- Charles Darwin and his first cousin, Emma Wedgwood. Their respective siblings Caroline Darwin and Josiah Wedgwood III (1795–1880), entrepreneur, also married.
- St George Daly (1758-1829), Irish judge and politician, and his first cousin, Louisa Gore
- Sir Thomas Domvile, 1st Baronet (c. 1655-1721) and his first cousin, Elizabeth Lake
- Pierre S. du Pont (1870–1954), American businessman and philanthropist, married his first cousin, Alice Belin, in 1915
- Samuel Francis Du Pont (1803–1865), American Navy rear admiral, and his first cousin, Sophie Madeleine du Pont, the daughter of his uncle, Eleuthère Irénée du Pont
- Andrew Jackson Donelson (1799–1871), American diplomat and his first cousin, Emily Donelson (1807–1836)

E

- Albert Einstein (1879–1955), physicist, and his first cousin, Elsa Löwenthal née Einstein
- William Crowninshield Endicott (1826–1900), former US Secretary of War, and his first cousin, Ellen Peabody
- Ulises Espaillat (1823–1878), Dominican Republic liberal caudillo, and his first cousin Eloísa Espaillat

F

- Viriato Fiallo, Dominican Republic dissident, and his first cousin Prudencia Fiallo, daughter of his uncle Fabio Fiallo
- Vivian Fuchs (1908–1999), British explorer, and his cousin Joyce Connell

G

- Carlo Gambino (1902–1976), a mob boss, and his first cousin, Catherine Castellano
- Buddha Gautama and first cousin Yaśodharā
- André Gide, Nobel Prize-winning French author, and his cousin Madeleine Rondeaux
- Charlotte Perkins Gilman, American author, and her first cousin, George Houghton Gilman
- Carl Giles (1916–1995), British cartoonist, and his first cousin, Joan Giles
- A. D. Gordon (1856–1922), Russian-Jewish philosopher, and his cousin, Faige Tartakov
- Samuel L. Gouverneur (1799–1865), and his first cousin, Maria Hester Monroe (1802-1850), daughter of James Monroe, the fifth President of the United States
- Laurent de Gouvion Saint-Cyr (1764–1830), French general and later Marshal of the Empire, and his first cousin, Anne Gouvion
- Duncan Grant (1885–1978), Scottish painter, who was in a relationship with his male first cousin, the English writer Lytton Strachey.
- Bibb Graves (1873–1942), Governor of Alabama, and his first cousin, politician Dixie Bibb (1882–1965)
- Edvard Grieg (1843–1907), Norwegian composer and pianist, and his first cousin, Danish–Norwegian lyric soprano Nina Hagerup (1845–1935)

H

- Sir Henry Halford, 2nd Baronet and his first cousin, Barbara Vaughan
- Shaykh Haydar (1459–1488), leader of the Safavid order and his first cousin Alam-Shah Begum
- Friedrich Hayek (1899–1992), Austrian-British economist, and his cousin Helene Bitterlich
- Alexander Herzen (1812–1870), Russian writer and political activist, and his cousin Natalya Zakharina
- Mark Hopkins Jr. (1814–1878), American railroad executive, and his first cousin, Mary Sherwood (1818–1891)
- Saddam Hussein (1937–2006), fifth President of Iraq, and his first cousin Sajida Talfah (b. 1935)

J

- Ja'far al-Sadiq (700 or 702 – 765), Muslim scholar, and his first cousin, Fatima bint al-Hussain'l-Athram bin al-Hasan bin Ali
- Jesse James (1847–1882), American outlaw and guerilla, and his first cousin, Zerelda "Zee" Mimms (1845–1900)
- Jón Sigurðsson (1811–1879), leader of the 19th-century Icelandic independence movement, and his first cousin, Ingibjörg Einarsdóttir

K

- Naoto Kan (b. 1946), former Prime Minister of Japan, and his first cousin, Nobuko Himei (b. 1945), essayist
- Nobusuke Kishi (1896–1987), former Japanese statesman, and his first cousin, Yoshiko Kishi
- Natasha Klauss (born 1975), Colombian actress, and her first cousin, Marcelo Greco
- Kujō Michiie (1193–1252), Japanese regent, and his first cousin, Saionji Rinshi

L

- David Lean (1908–1991), British film director, and his first cousin, Isabel Lean (his first wife)
- Charles Lilburn Lewis and his first cousin, Lucy Jefferson Lewis
- Li Ka-shing (born 1928), founder of Cheung Kong Holdings, married his first cousin Chong Yuet Ming (c. 1935 – 1990)
- John Amory Lowell and his first cousin, Susan Cabot Lowell

M

- Rob Roy MacGregor (1671–1734), Scottish outlaw, and his cousin Mary Helen MacGregor of Comar, who married in January 1693
- Gerardo Machado (1869–1939), fifth president of Cuba, and his first cousin, Elvira Machado Nodal
- Maeda Toshiie (1538–1599), Japanese Daimyō in the 15th century, and his first cousin, Maeda Matsu (1547–1617)
- Nanaia Mahuta, Minister of Foreign Affairs (New Zealand), and her first cousin, William Gannin Ormsby
- Delarivier Manley, British playwright and political satirist, and her first cousin John Manley
- Francis Marion, American revolutionary leader also called the "Swamp Fox," and his first cousin, Mary Esther Videau
- Humphrey Marshall and his first cousin, Anna Maria ("Mary") Marshall.
- Abraham Maslow, father of humanistic psychology, and his first cousin, Bertha Goodman
- John Minor Maury and his first cousin, Eliza Maury
- Matthew Fontaine Maury married his first cousin, Ann Hull Herndon, sister of Captain William Lewis Herndon, who died on his ship SS Central America
- Randolph "Randall" McCoy, patriarch of the McCoy clan involved in the Hatfield–McCoy feud, and his first cousin Sarah "Sally" McCoy
- Darius Milhaud, French composer, and his first cousin Madeleine Milhaud
- Christopher Robin Milne, son of author A. A. Milne who was the model for the character Christopher Robin of the Winnie-the-Pooh books, and his first cousin on his mother's side Lesley Sélincourt
- Marina Mora, Peruvian beauty queen and former Miss Peru, and her first cousin Gustavo Mora
- Henry Morgan, Welsh privateer, and his first cousin Mary Morgan (daughter of his uncle Edward Morgan).
- William Morgan (c. 1640 – 1680) and his first cousin, Blanche Morgan
- Mōri Terumoto, Japanese Daimyo in late 15th and early 16th century, and his cousin (first wife), Minami no Kata.
- Gouverneur Morris Jr. (1813–1888), American railroad executive, and his first cousin, Martha Jefferson Cary the daughter of writer Virginia Randolph Cary
- Ignacy Mościcki, Polish chemist and president and his first cousin, Michalina Czyżewska
- Muhammad, Islamic prophet (c. 570 – 632) and his first cousin, Zaynab bint Jahsh
- George Munro, 1st of Newmore and his first cousin, Anne Munro

N

- Naoe Kanetsugu (1559–1620), Japanese samurai and Karō of the Uesugi clan in 16th and 17th centuries, and his first cousin, Osen.
- Sócrates Nolasco (1884–1980), Dominican Republic writer, and his first cousin Flérida Lamarche (1891–1976), who was a renowned pianist, writer, and teacher.

O

- Henry Ormsby (1812–1887), Irish lawyer and judge, and his first cousin, Julia Hamilton
- Ōtomo no Yakamochi (c. 718 – 785), Japanese statesman and waka poet in the Nara period, and his cousin, Sakanoue no Ōiratsume.

P

- Ahmad Maher Pasha (1888–1945), assassinated Egyptian prime minister, and his first cousin, Ihsan Hanem Sami
- Endicott Peabody (1857–1944), American educator, and his first cousin, Fannie Peabody.
- Lars Hannibal Sommerfeldt Stoud Platou (1848–1923), Norwegian psychiatrist, and his first cousin, Mimi Platou (1852–1928)
- Edgar Allan Poe (1809–1849), American writer and critic, and his first cousin, Virginia Clemm (1822–1847)
- John J. Pettus (1813–1867), 23rd Governor of Mississippi, and his first cousin, Permelia Virginia Winston
- Peter A. Porter (1827–1864), lawyer, politician and a Union Army colonel, and his first cousin, Mary Cabell Breckinridge (1826–1854), daughter of Rev. John Breckinridge (1797–1841), his mother's brother
- William Joseph Poupore (1846–1918), Canadian politician, and his first cousin, Eleonor Poupore
- Sir Robert Price, 2nd Baronet (1786–1857), and his first cousin Mary Price

R

- Sergei Rachmaninoff (1873–1943), Russian composer, and his first cousin, Natalia Satina
- Paul Ranson (1861–1909), French painter, and his first cousin, Marie-France Rousseau
- Satyajit Ray (1921–1992), Indian film-maker, and his first cousin, Bijoya Ray (1917–2015), Indian actress
- Jacques de Reinach (1840–1892), French banker, and his first cousin, Fanny Emden
- Aubrey Robinson (1853–1936), Hawaiian planter, and his first cousin, Alice Gay
- Hassan Rouhani (b. 1948), 7th president of Iran and his first cousin Sahebeh Rouhani née Arabi (b. 1954)

S

- Greta Scacchi (born 1960), Italian actress of Presumed Innocent, and her first cousin, Carlo Mantegazza
- Robert Sheldon, Baron Sheldon (1923–2020), and his first cousin, Eileen Shamash
- George Simpson (1792–1860), Scottish colonial official, and his first cousin, Frances Ramsay Simpson
- William Stith (1707–1755), American historian and an Anglican minister, and his first cousin, Judith Randolph
- Igor Stravinsky (1882–1971), Russian composer, and his first cousin, Katerina Nossenko
- Alexander Streatfeild-Moore, English cricketer, and his first cousin, Evelyn Agatha Gatyana Streatfeild

T

- Edward Thornton Tayloe (1803–1876), American diplomat, and his first cousin, Mary Ogle
- Kane Tanaka (1903-2022), Japanese supercentenarian, and her first cousin, Hideo Tanaka
- John Edward Taylor (1791–1844), 1821 founder of The Manchester Guardian (since 1959 The Guardian), in 1824 married his first cousin, Sophia Russell Scott.
- Toyotomi Hideyori (1593–1615), Japanese daimyō, a son of Toyotomi Hideyoshi (1537–1598), and his first cousin Senhime (1597–1666)
- Sir Harry Trelawny, 5th Baronet and his first cousin, Laetitia Trelawny
- Sir William Trelawny, 6th Baronet and his first cousin, Laetitia Trelawny

U

- Józef Unrug (1884–1973) Polish Naval admiral and his first cousin Zofia Unrug
- Uthman Abu Quhafa (538 or 540 – 635), father of the first Rashidun Caliph, Abu Bakr and his first cousin, Salma Umm al-Khair (d. between 632 and 634)

V

- Mario Vargas Llosa (1936–2025), Peruvian writer and 2010 Nobel laureate, and his first cousin Patricia Llosa

W

- H. G. Wells (1866–1946), author, and his first cousin, Isabel Mary Wells (his first wife)
- William Whipple (1730–1785), signer of the Declaration of Independence, and his first cousin, Catherine Moffatt
- Sir Watkin Williams-Wynn, 6th Baronet (1820–1885), Welsh politician, and his first cousin, Marie Emily Williams-Wynn
- Sir Watkin Williams-Wynn, 7th Baronet (1860–1944), Welsh politician and Yeomanry officer, and his first cousin, Louise Alexandra Williams-Wynn
- John A. Winston (1812–1871), 15th Governor of Alabama and his first cousin, Mary Agness Jones
- Henry Winthrop (1608–1630), son of founder and Governor of the Massachusetts Bay Colony, and his first cousin Elizabeth Fones (1610 – c. 1673)

Y

- Annie Henrietta Yule (1874–1950), film financier and breeder of Arab horses at Hanstead Stud in England, and her first cousin Sir David Yule, 1st Baronet (1858–1928), Scottish business based in British India

== Royalty in Europe ==
| Husband | Wife | Married | Shared grandparents | Ref(s) |
|---|---|---|---|---|
| Adolph of Cleves, Lord of Ravenstein | Anna van Bourgondië | 1470 | John the Fearless and Margaret of Bavaria | |
| Adolphus I, Prince of Schaumburg-Lippe | Princess Hermine of Waldeck and Pyrmont | 25 October 1844 | George I, Prince of Waldeck and Pyrmont and Princess Augusta of Schwarzburg-Sondershausen | |
| Adolphus Frederick I of Mecklenburg-Schwerin | Anna Maria of Ostfriesland | 4 September 1622 | Adolf, Duke of Holstein-Gottorp and Christine of Hesse | |
| Afonso V of Portugal | Isabel of Coimbra | 6 May 1447 | John I of Portugal and Philippa of Lancaster | |
| Prince Albert of Prussia | Princess Marianne of the Netherlands | 14 September 1830 | Frederick William II of Prussia and Frederica Louisa of Hesse-Darmstadt | |
| Prince Albert of Saxe-Coburg and Gotha | Queen Victoria | 10 February 1840 | Francis, Duke of Saxe-Coburg-Saalfeld and Countess Augusta Reuss of Ebersdorf | |
| Albert IV of Saxe-Eisenach | Dorothea of Saxe-Altenburg | 24 June 1633 | Johann Wilhelm, Duke of Saxe-Weimar and Dorothea Susanne of Simmern | |
| Albert VII of Austria | Infanta Isabella Clara Eugenia of Spain | 18 April 1599 | Charles V, Holy Roman Emperor and Isabella of Portugal | |
| Albert Anton, Prince of Schwarzburg-Rudolstadt | Countess Emilie Juliane of Barby-Mühlingen | 7 June 1665 | Anthony II, Count of Oldenburg and Sibylle Elisabeth of Brunswick-Dannenberg | |
| Prince Alfonso, Count of Caserta | Princess Maria Antonietta of Bourbon-Two Sicilies | 8 June 1868 | Francis I of the Two Sicilies and María Isabel of Spain | |
| Alfonso V of Aragon | Maria of Castile | 12 June 1415 | John I of Castile and Eleanor of Aragon, Queen of Castile | |
| Alfonso IX of León | Theresa of Portugal, Queen of León | 15 February 1191 | Afonso I of Portugal and Matilda of Savoy, Queen of Portugal | |
| Alfonso XI of Castile | Maria of Portugal, Queen of Castile | 24 June 1328 | Sancho IV of Castile and María de Molina; Denis of Portugal and Elizabeth of Portugal | |
| Alfonso XII of Spain | Mercedes of Orléans | 23 January 1878 | Ferdinand VII of Spain and Maria Christina of the Two Sicilies | |
| Prince Alfred of Liechtenstein | Princess Henriette of Liechtenstein | 26 April 1865 | Johann I Joseph, Prince of Liechtenstein and Landgravine Josepha of Fürstenberg-Weitra | |
| Alfred II, Prince of Windisch-Grätz | Princess Hedwig of Lobkowicz | 19 October 1850 | Joseph II, Prince of Schwarzenberg and Princesse Pauline of Arenberg | |
| Prince Amedeo, Duke of Aosta | Princess Anne of Orléans | 5 November 1927 | Prince Philippe, Count of Paris and Princess Marie Isabelle of Orléans | |
| Amyntas IV of Macedon | Cynane | | Amyntas III of Macedon and Eurydice I of Macedon | |
| Anthony Ulrich, Duke of Brunswick | Elisabeth Juliane of Schleswig-Holstein-Sonderburg-Norburg | 17 August 1656 | Rudolph, Prince of Anhalt-Zerbst and Dorothea Hedwig of Brunswick-Wolfenbüttel | |
| Infante Antonio, Duke of Galliera | Infanta Eulalia of Spain | 6 March 1886 | Ferdinand VII of Spain and Maria Christina of the Two Sicilies | |
| Prince August of Schwarzburg-Sondershausen | Princess Christine of Anhalt-Bernburg | 27 April 1762 | Karl Frederick, Prince of Anhalt-Bernburg and Sophie Albertine of Solms-Sonnenwalde | |
| Prince August Wilhelm of Prussia | Princess Alexandra Victoria of Schleswig-Holstein-Sonderburg-Glücksburg | 22 October 1908 | Frederick VIII, Duke of Schleswig-Holstein and Princess Adelheid of Hohenlohe-Langenburg | |
| Augustus William, Duke of Brunswick-Wolfenbüttel | Christine Sophie of Brunswick-Lüneburg | 29 June 1681 | Augustus II, Duke of Brunswick and Dorothea of Anhalt-Zerbst | |
| Augustus William, Duke of Brunswick-Wolfenbüttel | Elisabeth Sophie Marie of Schleswig-Holstein-Sonderburg-Norburg | 12 September 1710 | Frederick, Duke of Schleswig-Holstein-Sønderburg-Norburg and Eleanor of Anhalt-Zerbst | |
| Bernard VII, Count of Armagnac | Bonne of Berry | 2 December 1393 | John I, Count of Armagnac and Beatrice of Clermont | |
| Infante Carlos, Count of Montemolin | Princess Maria Carolina of the Two Sicilies | 10 July 1850 | Charles IV of Spain and Maria Luisa of Parma | |
| Charles I, Duke of Orléans | Isabella of Valois | 29 October 1406 | Charles V of France and Joanna of Bourbon | |
| Charles the Bold | Isabella of Bourbon | 30 October 1454 | John the Fearless and Margaret of Bavaria | |
| Prince Charles of Hesse-Kassel | Princess Louise of Denmark | 30 August 1766 | George II of Great Britain and Caroline of Ansbach | |
| Charles, Duke of Aumale | Marie of Lorraine | 10 November 1576 | Claude, Duke of Guise and Antoinette of Bourbon | |
| Charles, Margrave of Burgau | Sibylle of Jülich-Cleves-Berg | 4 March 1601 | Ferdinand I, Holy Roman Emperor and Anne of Bohemia and Hungary | |
| Charles, Wild- and Rhinegrave of Salm-Dhaun | Louise of Nassau-Ottweiler | 19 January 1704 | John Louis, Count of Nassau-Ottweiler and Countess Palatine Dorothea Catherine of Birkenfeld-Bischweiler | |
| Charles I, Landgrave of Hesse-Kassel | Maria Amalia of Courland | 21 May 1673 | George William, Elector of Brandenburg and Elizabeth Charlotte of the Palatinate, Electress of Brandenburg | |
| Charles III of Naples | Margaret of Durazzo | 24 January 1370 | John, Duke of Durazzo and Agnes of Périgord | |
| Charles IV of Spain | Maria Luisa of Parma | 4 September 1765 | Philip V of Spain and Elisabeth Farnese | |
| Charles IV, Duke of Lorraine | Nicole, Duchess of Lorraine | 23 May 1621 | Charles III, Duke of Lorraine and Claude of Valois | |
| Charles V, Holy Roman Emperor | Isabella of Portugal | 10 March 1526 | Ferdinand II of Aragon and Isabella I of Castile | |
| Charles XIII of Sweden | Hedvig Elisabeth Charlotte of Holstein-Gottorp | 7 July 1774 | Christian August of Holstein-Gottorp, Prince of Eutin and Princess Albertina Frederica of Baden-Durlach | |
| Charles Albert II, Prince of Hohenlohe-Waldenburg-Schillingsfürst | Princess Leopodine of Löwenstein-Wertheim-Rochefort | 19 May 1761 | Dominic Marquard, Prince of Löwenstein-Wertheim-Rochefort and Landgravine Christine of Hesse-Wanfried | |
| Charles Alexander, Grand Duke of Saxe-Weimar-Eisenach | Princess Sophie of the Netherlands | 8 October 1842 | Paul I of Russia and Sophie Dorothea of Württemberg | |
| Charles Emmanuel II, Duke of Savoy | Françoise Madeleine d'Orléans | 4 March 1663 | Henry IV of France and Marie de' Medici | |
| Charles Louis, Hereditary Prince of Baden | Princess Amalie of Hesse-Darmstadt | 15 July 1775 | Louis VIII, Landgrave of Hesse-Darmstadt and Countess Charlotte of Hanau-Lichtenberg | |
| Christian Louis I, Duke of Mecklenburg-Schwerin | Christine Margarethe of Mecklenburg-Güstrow | 6 July 1650 | John VII, Duke of Mecklenburg-Schwerin and Sophia of Holstein-Gottorp | |
| Charles Lucien Bonaparte | Zénaïde Bonaparte | 29 June 1822 | Carlo Buonaparte and Letizia Ramolino | |
| Charles Theodore, Elector of Bavaria | Countess Palatine Elisabeth Auguste of Sulzbach | 17 January 1742 | Theodore Eustace, Count Palatine of Sulzbach and Princess Maria Eleonore of Hesse-Rotenburg | |
| Prince Christian of Schaumburg-Lippe | Princess Feodora of Denmark | 9 September 1937 | Frederick VIII of Denmark and Louise of Sweden | |
| Christian II, Duke of Saxe-Merseburg | Erdmuthe Dorothea of Saxe-Zeitz | 14 October 1679 | John George I, Elector of Saxony and Magdalene Sibylle of Prussia | |
| Christian VII of Denmark | Princess Caroline Matilda of Wales | 8 November 1766 | George II of Great Britain and Caroline of Ansbach | |
| Christian VIII of Denmark | Duchess Charlotte Frederica of Mecklenburg-Schwerin | 21 June 1806 | Ludwig, Hereditary Prince of Mecklenburg-Schwerin and Princess Charlotte Sophie of Saxe-Coburg-Saalfeld | |
| Christian Albrecht, Prince of Hohenlohe-Langenburg | Caroline of Stolberg-Gedern | 13 April 1761 | Louis Crato, Count of Nassau-Saarbrücken and Countess Philippine Henriette of Hohenlohe-Langenburg | |
| Christian August of Holstein-Gottorp, Prince of Eutin | Princess Albertina Frederica of Baden-Durlach | 2 September 1704 | Frederick III, Duke of Holstein-Gottorp and Duchess Marie Elisabeth of Saxony | |
| Christian Ernst, Margrave of Brandenburg-Bayreuth | Erdmuthe Sophie of Saxony | 29 October 1662 | Christian, Margrave of Brandenburg-Bayreuth and Marie of Prussia, Margravine of Brandenburg-Bayreuth | |
| Christian Günther I, Count of Schwarzburg-Sondershausen | Anna Sibylle of Schwarzburg-Rudolstadt | 15 November 1612 | Günther XL, Count of Schwarzburg and Countess Elisabeth zu Ysenburg-Büdingen in Birstein | |
| Christian Günther III, Prince of Schwarzburg-Sondershausen | Charlotte Wilhelmine of Anhalt-Bernburg | 4 February 1760 | Karl Frederick, Prince of Anhalt-Bernburg and Sophie Albertine of Solms-Sonnenwalde | |
| Christian Ludwig II, Duke of Mecklenburg-Schwerin | Duchess Gustave Caroline of Mecklenburg-Strelitz | 13 November 1714 | Adolphus Frederick I, Duke of Mecklenburg-Schwerin and Duchess Marie Katharina of Brunswick-Dannenberg | |
| Constantine, Landgrave of Hesse-Rotenburg | Countess Sophia von Starhemberg | 25 August 1745 | Maximilian Karl, Prince of Löwenstein-Wertheim-Rochefort and Countess Maria Polyxena Khuen of Lichtenberg and Belasi | |
| Drusus Julius Caesar | Livilla | 4 | Tiberius Claudius Nero and Livia | |
| Erdmann August, Hereditary Prince of Brandenburg-Bayreuth | Margravine Sophie of Brandenburg-Ansbach | 8 December 1641 | John George, Elector of Brandenburg and Elisabeth of Anhalt-Zerbst | |
| Ernest Augustus, King of Hanover | Frederica of Mecklenburg-Strelitz | 29 August 1815 | Duke Charles Louis Frederick of Mecklenburg and Princess Elisabeth Albertine of Saxe-Hildburghausen | |
| Ernest Günther I, Duke of Schleswig-Holstein-Sonderburg-Augustenburg | Princess Augusta of Schleswig-Holstein-Sonderburg-Glücksburg | 15 June 1651 | John the Younger, Duke of Schleswig-Holstein-Sonderburg and Elisabeth of Brunswick-Grubenhagen | |
| Ernest Louis, Grand Duke of Hesse | Princess Victoria Melita of Saxe-Coburg and Gotha | 9 April 1894 | Queen Victoria and Prince Albert of Saxe-Coburg and Gotha | |
| Ernst II Leopold, Landgrave of Hesse-Rotenburg | Eleonore of Löwenstein-Wertheim | 9 November 1704 | Ferdinand Karl, Count of Löwenstein-Wertheim-Rochefort and Countess Anna Maria of Fürstenberg-Heiligenberg | |
| Ernst Ludwig I, Duke of Saxe-Meiningen | Dorothea Marie of Saxe-Gotha-Altenburg | 19 September 1704 | Ernest I, Duke of Saxe-Gotha and Princess Elisabeth Sophie of Saxe-Altenburg | |
| Duke Eugen of Württemberg | Princess Mathilde of Schaumburg-Lippe | 15 July 1843 | George I, Prince of Waldeck and Pyrmont and Princess Augusta of Schwarzburg-Sondershausen | |
| Prince Felix of Bourbon-Parma | Charlotte, Grand Duchess of Luxembourg | 6 November 1919 | Miguel I of Portugal and Adelaide of Löwenstein-Wertheim-Rosenberg | |
| Prince Ferdinand of Bavaria | Infanta María Teresa of Spain | 12 January 1906 | Isabella II of Spain and Francisco de Asís, Duke of Cádiz | |
| Ferdinand, Duke of Viseu | Beatriz of Portugal, Duchess of Viseu | 16 March 1452 | John I of Portugal and Philippa of Lancaster | |
| Ferdinand I of Naples | Joanna of Aragon, Queen of Naples | 14 September 1477 | Ferdinand I of Aragon and Eleanor of Alburquerque | |
| Ferdinand II, Holy Roman Emperor | Maria Anna of Bavaria | 23 April 1600 | Albert V, Duke of Bavaria and Archduchess Anna of Austria | |
| Ferdinand III, Holy Roman Emperor | Maria Anna of Spain | 20 February 1631 | Charles II, Archduke of Austria and Maria Anna of Bavaria | |
| Ferdinand III, Holy Roman Emperor | Maria Leopoldine of Austria | 2 July 1648 | Charles II, Archduke of Austria and Maria Anna of Bavaria | |
| Ferdinand III, Grand Duke of Tuscany | Princess Luisa of Naples and Sicily | 15 August 1790 | Francis I, Holy Roman Emperor and Maria Theresa; Charles III of Spain and Maria Amalia of Saxony | |
| Ferdinand VII of Spain | Princess Maria Antonia of Naples and Sicily | 6 October 1802 | Charles III of Spain and Maria Amalia of Saxony | |
| Ferdinand Charles, Archduke of Austria | Anna de' Medici, Archduchess of Austria | 10 June 1646 | Charles II, Archduke of Austria and Maria Anna of Bavaria; Ferdinando I de' Medici, Grand Duke of Tuscany and Christina of Lorraine | |
| Ferdinando II de' Medici, Grand Duke of Tuscany | Vittoria della Rovere | 26 September 1633 | Ferdinando I de' Medici, Grand Duke of Tuscany and Christina of Lorraine | |
| Francesco II d'Este, Duke of Modena | Margherita Maria Farnese | 14 July 1692 | Francesco I d'Este, Duke of Modena and Maria Caterina Farnese | |
| Francis I of the Two Sicilies | Archduchess Maria Clementina of Austria | 26 June 1797 | Francis I, Holy Roman Emperor and Maria Theresa; Charles III of Spain and Maria Amalia of Saxony | |
| Francis I of the Two Sicilies | María Isabel of Spain | 10 October 1802 | Charles III of Spain and Maria Amalia of Saxony | |
| Francis II, Holy Roman Emperor | Maria Theresa of Naples and Sicily | 15 September 1790 | Francis I, Holy Roman Emperor and Maria Theresa; Charles III of Spain and Maria Amalia of Saxony | |
| Francis II, Holy Roman Emperor | Maria Ludovika of Austria-Este | 6 January 1808 | Francis I, Holy Roman Emperor and Maria Theresa | |
| Francisco de Asís, Duke of Cádiz | Isabella II of Spain | 10 October 1846 | Charles IV of Spain and Maria Luisa of Parma; Francis I of the Two Sicilies and María Isabel of Spain | |
| Franz Joseph I of Austria | Duchess Elisabeth in Bavaria | 24 April 1854 | Maximilian I Joseph of Bavaria and Caroline of Baden | |
| Prince Frederick of the Netherlands | Princess Louise of Prussia | 21 May 1825 | Frederick William II of Prussia and Frederica Louisa of Hesse-Darmstadt | |
| Prince Frederick of Württemberg | Princess Catherine of Württemberg | 20 November 1845 | Frederick I of Württemberg and Duchess Augusta of Brunswick-Wolfenbüttel | |
| Frederick I of Prussia | Elisabeth Henriette of Hesse-Kassel | 23 August 1679 | George William, Elector of Brandenburg and Elizabeth Charlotte of the Palatinate, Electress of Brandenburg | |
| Frederick I of Sweden | Princess Luise Dorothea of Prussia | 31 May 1700 | William VI, Landgrave of Hesse-Kassel and Princess Hedwig Sophie of Brandenburg | |
| Frederick II, Duke of Saxe-Gotha-Altenburg | Princess Magdalena Augusta of Anhalt-Zerbst | 7 June 1696 | Augustus, Duke of Saxe-Weissenfels and Anna Maria of Mecklenburg-Schwerin | |
| Frederick III, Duke of Saxe-Gotha-Altenburg | Princess Luise Dorothea of Saxe-Meiningen | 17 September 1729 | Frederick I, Duke of Saxe-Gotha-Altenburg and Magdalena Sibylla of Saxe-Weissenfels | |
| Frederick IV, Duke of Holstein-Gottorp | Hedvig Sophia of Sweden | 12 May 1698 | Frederick III of Denmark and Sophie Amalie of Brunswick-Calenberg | |
| Frederick IV, Landgrave of Hesse-Homburg | Princess Ulrike Louise of Solms-Braunfels | 10 October 1746 | Wilhelm Moritz, Count of Solms-Braunfels and Magdalena Sophie of Hesse-Homburg | |
| Frederick VI of Denmark | Marie of Hesse-Kassel | 31 July 1790 | Frederick V of Denmark and Louise of Great Britain | |
| Frederick Casimir Kettler | Princess Elisabeth Sophie of Brandenburg | 29 April 1691 | George William, Elector of Brandenburg and Elizabeth Charlotte of the Palatinate, Electress of Brandenburg | |
| Frederick Christian, Elector of Saxony | Duchess Maria Antonia of Bavaria | 13 June 1747 | Joseph I, Holy Roman Emperor and Wilhelmine Amalie of Brunswick | |
| Frederick Henry, Margrave of Brandenburg-Schwedt | Princess Leopoldine Marie of Anhalt-Dessau | 13 February 1739 | John George II, Prince of Anhalt-Dessau and Countess Henriette Catharina of Nassau | |
| Frederick Louis, Count of Nassau-Ottweiler | Louise Sophie of Hanau-Lichtenberg | 27 September 1697 | Christian I, Count Palatine of Birkenfeld-Bischweiler and Countess Palatine Magdalene Catherine of Zweibrücken | |
| Frederick Louis, Count Palatine of Zweibrücken | Juliana Magdalena of Palatinate-Zweibrücken | 14 November 1645 | John I, Count Palatine of Zweibrücken and Magdalene of Jülich-Cleves-Berg | |
| Frederick William, Grand Duke of Mecklenburg-Strelitz | Princess Augusta of Cambridge | 28 June 1843 | Prince Frederick of Hesse-Kassel and Princess Caroline of Nassau-Usingen | |
| Frederick William I of Prussia | Sophia Dorothea of Hanover | 28 November 1706 | Ernest Augustus, Elector of Hanover and Sophia of Hanover | |
| Frederick William II of Prussia | Elisabeth Christine of Brunswick-Wolfenbüttel, Crown Princess of Prussia | 14 July 1765 | Frederick William I of Prussia and Sophia Dorothea of Hanover; Ferdinand Albert II, Duke of Brunswick-Wolfenbüttel and Princess Antoinette of Brunswick-Wolfenbüttel | |
| Friedrich Günther, Prince of Schwarzburg-Rudolstadt | Auguste of Anhalt-Dessau | 15 April 1816 | Frederick V, Landgrave of Hesse-Homburg and Princess Caroline of Hesse-Darmstadt | |
| Friedrich Josias, Prince of Saxe-Coburg and Gotha | Countess Viktoria-Luise of Solms-Baruth | 25 January 1942 | Friedrich Ferdinand, Duke of Schleswig-Holstein and Princess Karoline Mathilde of Schleswig-Holstein-Sonderburg-Augustenburg | |
| Duke George of Oldenburg | Catherine Pavlovna of Russia | 3 August 1809 | Frederick II Eugene, Duke of Württemberg and Princess Friederike of Brandenburg-Schwedt | |
| George I of Great Britain | Sophia Dorothea of Celle | 22 November 1682 | George, Duke of Brunswick and Anne Eleonore of Hesse-Darmstadt | |
| George IV of the United Kingdom | Caroline of Brunswick | 8 April 1795 | Frederick, Prince of Wales and Princess Augusta of Saxe-Gotha | |
| Prince George Bernhard of Anhalt-Dessau | Princess Karoline of Scharzburg-Rudolstadt | 6 August 1825 | Frederick V, Landgrave of Hesse-Homburg and Princess Caroline of Hesse-Darmstadt | |
| George Rudolf of Liegnitz | Sophie Elisabeth of Anhalt-Dessau | 4 November 1614 | Joachim Ernest, Prince of Anhalt and Agnes of Barby-Mühlingen | |
| George Rudolf of Liegnitz | Elisabeth Magdalena of Münsterberg-Oels | 25 November 1624 | George II of Brieg and Barbara of Brandenburg, Duchess of Brieg | |
| Gian Galeazzo Sforza | Isabella of Aragon, Duchess of Milan | 2 February 1489 | Francesco I Sforza and Bianca Maria Visconti | |
| Gian Galeazzo Visconti | Caterina Visconti | 2 October 1380 | Stefano Visconti and Valentina Doria | |
| Günther Friedrich Karl II, Prince of Schwarzburg-Sondershausen | Princess Caroline of Schwarzburg-Rudolstadt | 12 March 1827 | Frederick Charles, Prince of Schwarzburg-Rudolstadt and Princess Friederike Sophie Auguste of Schwarzburg-Rudolstadt | |
| Günther Victor, Prince of Schwarzburg | Princess Anna Louise of Schönburg-Waldenburg | 9 December 1891 | Otto Victor, Prince of Schönburg-Waldenburg and Princess Thekla of Schwarzburg-Rudolstadt | |
| Gustav, Prince of Vasa | Princess Louise Amelie of Baden | 9 November 1830 | Charles Louis, Hereditary Prince of Baden and Princess Amalie of Hesse-Darmstadt | |
| Haakon VII of Norway | Maud of Wales | 22 July 1896 | Christian IX of Denmark and Louise of Hesse-Kassel | |
| Şehzade Halil | Irene Palaiologina | 28 May 1347 | John VI Kantakouzenos and Irene Asanina | |
| Hans, Prince of Hohenlohe-Öhringen | Princess Olga of Hohenlohe-Öhringen | 29 April 1889 | August, Prince of Hohenlohe-Öhringen and Duchess Louise of Württemberg | |
| Hans-Adam I, Prince of Liechtenstein | Erdmuthe Maria Theresia of Dietrichstein | 16 February 1681 | Maximilian, Prince of Dietrichstein and Princess Anna Maria of Liechtenstein | |
| Henri I, Prince of Condé | Marie of Cleves, Princess of Condé | 4 December 1572 | Charles, Duke of Vendôme and Françoise d'Alençon | |
| Henri d'Orléans, Duke of Aumale | Princess Maria Carolina of Bourbon-Two Sicilies | 25 November 1844 | Ferdinand I of the Two Sicilies and Maria Carolina of Austria | |
| Henry, Duke of Villena | Infanta Catherine, Duchess of Villena | 12 July 1420 | John I of Castile and Eleanor of Aragon, Queen of Castile | |
| Prince Henry of Prussia | Princess Irene of Hesse and by Rhine | 24 May 1888 | Queen Victoria and Prince Albert of Saxe-Coburg and Gotha | |
| Henry IV of Castile | Blanche II of Navarre | 15 September 1440 | Ferdinand I of Aragon and Eleanor of Alburquerque | |
| Henry IV of Castile | Joan of Portugal | 21 May 1455 | Ferdinand I of Aragon and Eleanor of Alburquerque | |
| Henry Frederick, Count of Hohenlohe-Langenburg | Countess Eleonore Magdalene of Hohenlohe-Weikersheim | 25 January 1652 | Wolfgang, Count of Hohenlohe-Weikersheim and Magdalena of Nassau-Dillenburg | |
| Herman Adolph, Count of Lippe | Countess Amalia of Lippe-Brake | 27 February 1666 | Simon VI, Count of Lippe and Elizabeth of Schaumburg and Holstein-Pinneberg | |
| Henry Casimir II, Prince of Nassau-Dietz | Princess Henriëtte Amalia of Anhalt-Dessau | 16 November 1683 | Frederick Henry, Prince of Orange and Amalia of Solms-Braunfels | |
| Herman IV, Landgrave of Hesse-Rotenburg | Sophie Juliane of Waldeck-Wildungen | 31 December 1633 | John VII, Count of Nassau-Siegen and Magdalene of Waldeck-Wildungen | |
| Ivan Sratsimir of Bulgaria | Anna of Wallachia | 1356 | Basarab I of Wallachia and Doamna Margareta | |
| Prince Jean, Duke of Guise | Princess Isabelle of Orléans | 30 October 1899 | Prince Ferdinand Philippe, Duke of Orléans and Duchess Helene of Mecklenburg-Schwerin | |
| João I, Duke of Braganza | Catarina of Portugal, Duchess of Braganza | 8 December 1563 | Jaime, Duke of Braganza and Leonor Pérez de Guzmán | |
| João Manuel, Prince of Portugal | Joanna of Austria, Princess of Portugal | 11 January 1552 | Philip I of Castile and Joanna of Castile; Manuel I of Portugal and Maria of Aragon, Queen of Portugal | |
| Johann, Prince of Hohenzollern-Sigmaringen | Johanna of Hohenzollern-Hechingen | 30 June 1602 | Karl I, Count of Hohenzollern and Anna of Baden-Durlach | |
| Johann Adolf I, Duke of Saxe-Weissenfels | Johanna Magdalena of Saxe-Altenburg | 25 October 1671 | John George I, Elector of Saxony and Magdalene Sibylle of Prussia | |
| Johann Christoph, Count of Hohenzollern-Haigerloch | Marie of Hohenzollern-Sigmaringen | 21 September 1608 | Karl I, Count of Hohenzollern and Anna of Baden-Durlach | |
| Johann Nepomuk Karl, Prince of Liechtenstein | Countess Maria Josepha of Harrach-Rohrau | 19 March 1744 | Anton Florian, Prince of Liechtenstein and Countess Eleonore Barbara of Thun-Hohenstein | |
| John Stewart, Duke of Albany | Anne de La Tour d'Auvergne | 13 July 1505 | Bertrand VI, Count of Auvergne and Louise de La Trémoille | |
| John of Valois, Count of Montpensier | Catherine of France, Countess of Montpensier | 5 August 1386 | John II of France and Bonne of Luxembourg | |
| John, Count of Soissons and Enghien | Mary of Bourbon | 14 June 1557 | Francis, Count of Vendôme and Marie I, Countess of Saint-Pol and Soissons | |
| John, Duke of Östergötland | Princess Maria Elizabeth of Sweden | 29 November 1612 | Gustav I of Sweden and Margaret Leijonhufvud | |
| John II of Castile | Maria of Aragon, Queen of Castile | 4 August 1420 | John I of Castile and Eleanor of Aragon, Queen of Castile | |
| John II of Portugal | Eleanor of Viseu | 22 January 1470 | Edward, King of Portugal and Eleanor of Aragon, Queen of Portugal | |
| John III of Portugal | Catherine of Austria, Queen of Portugal | 10 February 1525 | Ferdinand II of Aragon and Isabella I of Castile | |
| John IV, Duke of Brabant | Jacqueline, Countess of Hainaut | 10 March 1418 | Philip the Bold and Margaret III, Countess of Flanders | |
| John V of Portugal | Maria Anna of Austria | 27 October 1708 | Philip William, Elector Palatine and Landgravine Elisabeth Amalie of Hesse-Darmstadt | |
| John Augustus, Prince of Anhalt-Zerbst | Princess Fredericka of Saxe-Gotha-Altenburg | 25 May 1702 | Augustus, Duke of Saxe-Weissenfels and Anna Maria of Mecklenburg-Schwerin | |
| John Casimir, Prince of Anhalt-Dessau | Sophie Margarete of Anhalt-Bernburg | 14 July 1651 | Joachim Ernest, Prince of Anhalt and Agnes of Barby-Mühlingen | |
| John Christian of Brieg | Dorothea Sibylle of Brandenburg | 12 December 1610 | Joachim Ernest, Prince of Anhalt and Agnes of Barby-Mühlingen | |
| John Christian, Count Palatine of Sulzbach | Princess Eleonore of Hesse-Rotenburg | 11 January 1731 | William I, Landgrave of Hesse-Rotenburg and Countess Maria Anna of Löwenstein-Wertheim-Rochefort | |
| John George II, Elector of Saxony | Margravine Magdalene Sibylle of Brandenburg-Bayreuth | 13 November 1638 | Albert Frederick, Duke of Prussia and Marie Eleonore of Cleves | |
| Joseph Wenzel I, Prince of Liechtenstein | Anna Maria of Liechtenstein | 19 April 1718 | Prince Hartmann III of Liechtenstein and Countess Sidonie Elisabeth of Salm-Reifferscheidt | |
| Julius Ernst, Duke of Brunswick-Dannenberg | Duchess Sybille of Braunschweig-Lüneburg | 18 December 1617 | Ernest I, Duke of Brunswick and Duchess Sophia of Mecklenburg-Schwerin | |
| Karl, Duke of Schleswig-Holstein-Sonderburg-Glücksburg | Princess Vilhelmine Marie of Denmark | 19 May 1838 | Prince Charles of Hesse-Kassel and Princess Louise of Denmark | |
| Karl Aloys, Prince of Fürstenberg | Princess Elisabeth of Thurn and Taxis | 4 November 1790 | Joseph Wilhelm Ernst, Prince of Fürstenberg and Countess Maria Anna von Waldstein-Wartenberg | |
| Karl Anselm, 4th Prince of Thurn and Taxis | Duchess Auguste of Württemberg | 3 September 1753 | Anselm Franz, 2nd Prince of Thurn and Taxis and Maria Ludovika Anna Franziska, Princess of Lobkowicz | |
| Prince Karl Anton of Hohenzollern | Princess Joséphine Caroline of Belgium | 28 May 1894 | Karl Anton, Prince of Hohenzollern and Princess Josephine of Baden | |
| Prince Karl Anton August of Schleswig-Holstein-Sonderburg-Beck | Countess Charlotte of Dohna-Leistenau | 30 May 1754 | Frederick Louis, Duke of Schleswig-Holstein-Sonderburg-Beck and Louise Charlotte of Schleswig-Holstein-Sonderburg-Augustenburg | |
| Karl August, Prince of Waldeck and Pyrmont | Countess Palatine Christiane Henriette of Zweibrücken-Birkenfeld | 19 August 1741 | Christian II, Count Palatine of Zweibrücken-Birkenfeld and Countess Katharina Agathe of Rappoltstein | |
| Archduke Karl Ferdinand of Austria | Archduchess Elisabeth Franziska of Austria | 18 April 1854 | Leopold II, Holy Roman Emperor and Maria Luisa of Spain | |
| Karl Frederick, Prince of Anhalt-Bernburg | Sophie Albertine of Solms-Sonnenwalde | 25 June 1692 | Christian II, Prince of Anhalt-Bernburg and Eleonore Sophie of Schleswig-Holstein-Sonderburg | |
| Karl Friedrich, Prince of Hohenzollern-Sigmaringen | Johanna of Hohenzollern-Bergh | 2 March 1749 | Meinrad II, Prince of Hohenzollern-Sigmaringen and Johanna Katharina von Montfort | |
| Archduke Karl Ludwig of Austria | Princess Margaretha of Saxony | 4 November 1856 | Maximilian I Joseph of Bavaria and Caroline of Baden | |
| Archduke Karl Salvator of Austria | Princess Maria Immaculata of Bourbon-Two Sicilies | 19 September 1861 | Francis I of the Two Sicilies and María Isabel of Spain | |
| Karl Theodor, Duke in Bavaria | Princess Sophie of Saxony | 11 February 1865 | Maximilian I Joseph of Bavaria and Caroline of Baden | |
| Grand Duke Kirill Vladimirovich of Russia | Princess Victoria Melita of Saxe-Coburg and Gotha | 8 October 1905 | Alexander II of Russia and Marie of Hesse | |
| Knud, Hereditary Prince of Denmark | Princess Caroline-Mathilde of Denmark | 8 September 1933 | Frederick VIII of Denmark and Louise of Sweden | |
| Leo III of Armenia | Agnes (Marie) de Lusignan | | Leo II, King of Armenia and Keran, Queen of Armenia; Hugh III of Cyprus and Isabella of Ibelin, Queen of Cyprus and Jerusalem | |
| Leopold II, Grand Duke of Tuscany | Princess Maria Antonia of the Two Sicilies | 7 June 1833 | Ferdinand I of the Two Sicilies and Maria Carolina of Austria | |
| Leopold III, Duke of Anhalt-Dessau | Princess Louise of Brandenburg-Schwedt | 25 July 1767 | Leopold I, Prince of Anhalt-Dessau and Anna Luise Föhse | |
| Leopold Frederick, Duke of Württemberg-Montbéliard | Sibylle of Württemberg | 22 November 1647 | Frederick I, Duke of Württemberg and Sibylla of Anhalt | |
| Leopold Wilhelm, Margrave of Baden-Baden | Countess Maria Franziska of Fürstenberg-Heiligenberg | 23 February 1666 | Johann Georg, Prince of Hohenzollern-Hechingen and Franziska of Salm-Neufville | |
| Louis of Cyprus | Charlotte, Queen of Cyprus | 7 October 1459 | Janus, King of Cyprus and Charlotte of Bourbon, Queen of Cyprus | |
| Louis I of Etruria | Maria Luisa, Duchess of Lucca | 5 August 1795 | Philip, Duke of Parma and Louise-Élisabeth of France | |
| Louis I, Grand Duke of Hesse | Princess Louise of Hesse-Darmstadt | 19 February 1777 | Louis VIII, Landgrave of Hesse-Darmstadt and Countess Charlotte of Hanau-Lichtenberg | |
| Louis I, Duke of Orléans | Valentina Visconti, Duchess of Orléans | 25 November 1386 | John II of France and Bonne of Luxembourg | |
| Louis II, Grand Duke of Hesse | Princess Wilhelmine of Baden | 19 June 1804 | Louis IX, Landgrave of Hesse-Darmstadt and Countess Palatine Caroline of Zweibrücken | |
| Louis VI, Landgrave of Hesse-Darmstadt | Maria Elisabeth of Holstein-Gottorp | 24 November 1650 | John George I, Elector of Saxony and Magdalene Sibylle of Prussia | |
| Louis XIV of France | Maria Theresa of Spain | 9 June 1660 | Henry IV of France and Marie de' Medici; Philip III of Spain and Margaret of Austria, Queen of Spain | |
| Louis Antoine, Duke of Angoulême | Marie Thérèse of France | 10 June 1799 | Louis, Dauphin of France and Maria Josepha of Saxony, Dauphine of France | |
| Louis Armand II, Prince of Conti | Louise Élisabeth de Bourbon | 9 July 1713 | Henri Jules, Prince of Condé and Anne Henriette of Bavaria | |
| Louis François Joseph, Prince of Conti | Princess Maria Fortunata d'Este | 7 February 1759 | Philippe II, Duke of Orléans and Françoise Marie de Bourbon | |
| Louis Henri, Duke of Bourbon | Marie Anne de Bourbon | 9 August 1713 | Henri Jules, Prince of Condé and Anne Henriette of Bavaria | |
| Ludovico Visconti | Violante Visconti | 18 April 1381 | Stefano Visconti and Valentina Doria | |
| Prince Ludwig of Bavaria | Princess Irmingard of Bavaria | 20 July 1950 | Ludwig III of Bavaria and Maria Theresa of Austria-Este | |
| Ludwig, Prince of Hohenlohe-Langenburg | Countess Eleanor of Nassau-Saarbrücken | 23 January 1723 | Henry Frederick, Count of Hohenlohe-Langenburg and Countess Juliana Dorothea of Castell-Remlingen; Gustav Adolph, Count of Nassau-Saarbrücken and Landgravine Eleonore Klara of Hohenlohe-Neuenstein | |
| Prince Ludwig Ferdinand of Bavaria | Infanta María de la Paz of Spain | 2 April 1883 | Infante Francisco de Paula of Spain and Princess Luisa Carlotta of the Two Sicilies | |
| Marcus Aurelius | Faustina the Younger | 13 May 145 | Marcus Annius Verus and Rupilia Faustina | |
| Marcus Claudius Marcellus | Julia the Elder | 25 BC | Gaius Octavius and Atia | |
| Matthias, Holy Roman Emperor | Anna of Tyrol | 4 December 1611 | Ferdinand I, Holy Roman Emperor and Anne of Bohemia and Hungary | |
| Maximilian I, Elector of Bavaria | Elisabeth of Lorraine | 9 February 1595 | Francis I, Duke of Lorraine and Christina of Denmark | |
| Maximilian II, Holy Roman Emperor | Maria of Austria, Holy Roman Empress | 13 September 1548 | Philip I of Castile and Joanna of Castile | |
| Maximilian III Joseph, Elector of Bavaria | Maria Anna Sophia of Saxony | 9 July 1747 | Joseph I, Holy Roman Emperor and Wilhelmine Amalie of Brunswick | |
| Prince Miguel, Duke of Braganza | Princess Maria Theresa of Löwenstein-Wertheim-Rosenberg | 8 November 1893 | Constantine, Hereditary Prince of Löwenstein-Wertheim-Rosenberg and Princess Agnes of Hohenlohe-Langenburg | |
| Napoléon Louis Bonaparte | Charlotte Bonaparte | 23 July 1826 | Carlo Buonaparte and Letizia Ramolino | |
| Nero Julius Caesar | Julia Livia | 20 | Nero Claudius Drusus and Antonia Minor | |
| Nicholas Francis, Duke of Lorraine | Claude Françoise de Lorraine | 18 February 1634 | Charles III, Duke of Lorraine and Claude of Valois | |
| Ordoño IV of León | Urraca Fernández | 958 | Sancho I of Pamplona and Toda of Pamplona | |
| Olav V of Norway | Princess Märtha of Sweden | 21 March 1929 | Frederick VIII of Denmark and Louise of Sweden | |
| Otto, Prince of Stolberg-Wernigerode | Princess Anna Reuss of Köstritz | 22 August 1863 | Henry, Count of Stolberg-Wernigerode and Princess Johanna of Schönburg-Waldenburg | |
| Duke Paul Frederick of Mecklenburg | Princess Marie of Windisch-Graetz | 5 May 1881 | Paul Frederick, Grand Duke of Mecklenburg-Schwerin and Alexandrine of Prussia, Grand Duchess of Mecklenburg-Schwerin | |
| Infante Pedro Carlos of Spain and Portugal | Infanta Maria Teresa of Braganza | 13 May 1810 | Maria I of Portugal and Peter III of Portugal | |
| Philibert I, Duke of Savoy | Bianca Maria Sforza | 6 January 1474 | Louis, Duke of Savoy and Anne of Cyprus | |
| Philip II of Spain | Maria Manuela, Princess of Portugal | 15 November 1543 | Philip I of Castile and Joanna of Castile; Manuel I of Portugal and Maria of Aragon, Queen of Portugal | |
| Philipp Reinhard, Count of Hanau-Münzenberg | Countess Palatine Magdalena Claudia of Zweibrücken-Birkenfeld-Bischweiler | 27 February 1689 | Christian I, Count Palatine of Birkenfeld-Bischweiler and Countess Palatine Magdalene Catherine of Zweibrücken | |
| Prince Philippe, Count of Paris | Princess Marie Isabelle of Orléans | 30 May 1864 | Louis Philippe I and Maria Amalia of Naples and Sicily | |
| Philippe I, Duke of Orléans | Henrietta of England | 31 March 1661 | Henry IV of France and Marie de' Medici | |
| Philippe II, Duke of Orléans | Françoise Marie de Bourbon | 18 February 1692 | Louis XIII of France and Anne of Austria | |
| Pietro de' Medici | Eleonora di Garzia di Toledo | April 1571 | Pedro de Toledo y Zúñiga and María Osorio y Pimentel, 2nd Marquise of Villafranca del Bierzo | |
| Archduke Rainer Ferdinand of Austria | Archduchess Maria Karoline of Austria | 21 February 1852 | Leopold II, Holy Roman Emperor and Maria Luisa of Spain | |
| Ramiro II of León | Adosinda Gutiérrez | | Hermenegildo Gutiérrez and Ermesenda Gatónez | |
| Prince Ranieri, Duke of Castro | Countess Maria Carolina Zamoyska | 12 September 1923 | Prince Francis, Count of Trapani and Archduchess Maria Isabella of Austria | |
| Ranuccio II Farnese, Duke of Parma | Isabella d'Este, Duchess of Parma | 18 February 1664 | Ranuccio I Farnese, Duke of Parma and Margherita Aldobrandini | |
| Ranuccio II Farnese, Duke of Parma | Maria d'Este | 1 October 1668 | Ranuccio I Farnese, Duke of Parma and Margherita Aldobrandini | |
| Prince Robert, Duke of Chartres | Princess Françoise of Orléans | 11 June 1863 | Louis Philippe I and Maria Amalia of Naples and Sicily | |
| Ruprecht of the Palatinate | Elisabeth of Bavaria | 10 February 1499 | Louis IX, Duke of Bavaria and Amalia of Saxony, Duchess of Bavaria | |
| Sancho II of Pamplona | Urraca Fernández | 962 | Sancho I of Pamplona and Toda of Pamplona | |
| Simon August, Count of Lippe-Detmold | Princess Polyxena Louise of Nassau-Weilburg | 24 August 1750 | George August, Count of Nassau-Idstein and Princess Henriette Dorothea of Oettingen | |
| Teodósio I, Duke of Braganza | Isabel de Lencastre | 25 June 1542 | Fernando II, Duke of Braganza and Isabel of Viseu | |
| Umberto I of Italy | Margherita of Savoy | 21 April 1868 | Charles Albert of Sardinia and Maria Theresa of Austria, Queen of Sardinia | |
| Victor Emmanuel II of Italy | Adelaide of Austria | 12 April 1842 | Charles Emmanuel, Prince of Carignano and Princess Maria Christina of Saxony | |
| Vincenzo I Gonzaga, Duke of Mantua | Eleanor de' Medici | 29 April 1584 | Ferdinand I, Holy Roman Emperor and Anne of Bohemia and Hungary | |
| Prince Wilhelm of Prussia | Princess Maria Anna of Hesse-Homburg | 10 January 1804 | Louis IX, Landgrave of Hesse-Darmstadt and Countess Palatine Caroline of Zweibrücken | |
| William, Landgrave of Hesse-Philippsthal | Princess Ulrika Eleonora of Hesse-Philippsthal-Barchfeld | 22 June 1755 | Philip, Landgrave of Hesse-Philippsthal and Catherine of Solms-Laubach | |
| Duke William of Mecklenburg-Schwerin | Princess Alexandrine of Prussia | 9 December 1865 | Frederick William III of Prussia and Louise of Mecklenburg-Strelitz | |
| William I of the Netherlands | Wilhelmine of Prussia, Queen of the Netherlands | 1 October 1791 | Prince Augustus William of Prussia and Duchess Luise of Brunswick-Wolfenbüttel | |
| William I of Württemberg | Catherine Pavlovna of Russia | 24 January 1816 | Frederick II Eugene, Duke of Württemberg and Princess Friederike of Brandenburg-Schwedt | |
| William I of Württemberg | Pauline Therese of Württemberg | 5 April 1820 | Frederick II Eugene, Duke of Württemberg and Princess Friederike of Brandenburg-Schwedt | |
| William I, Elector of Hesse | Princess Wilhelmina Caroline of Denmark | 1 September 1764 | George II of Great Britain and Caroline of Ansbach | |
| William I, Count of Solms-Braunfels | Maria Amalia of Nassau-Dillenburg | 22 August 1600 | William I, Count of Nassau-Siegen and Juliana of Stolberg | |
| William III of England | Mary II of England | 4 November 1677 | Charles I of England and Henrietta Maria of France | |
| William III of the Netherlands | Sophie of Württemberg | 18 June 1839 | Paul I of Russia and Sophie Dorothea of Württemberg | |
| William Ernest, Duke of Saxe-Weimar | Charlotte Marie of Saxe-Jena | 2 November 1683 | William, Duke of Saxe-Weimar and Eleonore Dorothea of Anhalt-Dessau | |
| Prince William Frederick, Duke of Gloucester and Edinburgh | Princess Mary, Duchess of Gloucester and Edinburgh | 22 July 1816 | Frederick, Prince of Wales and Princess Augusta of Saxe-Gotha | |
| William Frederick, Margrave of Brandenburg-Ansbach | Christiane Charlotte of Württemberg-Winnental | 28 July 1709 | Albert II, Margrave of Brandenburg-Ansbach and Sophie Margarete of Oettingen-Oettingen | |
| William Louis, Count of Nassau-Dillenburg | Countess Anna of Nassau | 25 November 1587 | William I, Count of Nassau-Siegen and Juliana of Stolberg | |
| Władysław IV Vasa | Cecilia Renata of Austria | 9 August 1637 | Charles II, Archduke of Austria and Maria Anna of Bavaria | |

== Royalty outside Europe ==
| Husband | Wife | Married | Shared grandparents | Ref(s) |
|---|---|---|---|---|
| Pengiran Anak Abdul 'Ali Yil-Kabier | Pengiran Anak Hamidah Jamalul Bulqiah | 17 April 2005 | Omar Ali Saifuddien III and Queen Damit of Brunei | |
| Abhakara Kiartivongse | Dibyasambandh | 28 February 1900 | Mongkut and Debsirindra | |
| Alexander of Judaea | Alexandra the Maccabee | | Alexander Jannaeus and Salome Alexandra | |
| Al-Hadi | Lubabah bint Ja'far | 784–85 CE | Al-Mansur and Arwa | |
| Moulay Ali Alaoui | Lalla Fatima Zohra | 16 August 1961 | Yusef of Morocco and Lalla Yaqut | |
| Al-Mamun | Umm Isa | 805 CE | al-Mahdi and al-Khayzuran | |
| Antiochus II Theos | Laodice I | 266 BC | Seleucus I Nicator and Apama | |
| Antiochus III the Great | Laodice III | 222 BC | Antiochus II Theos and Laodice I | |
| Antiochus VIII Grypus | Tryphaena | 125 BC | Ptolemy VI Philometor and Cleopatra II | |
| Antiochus VIII Grypus | Cleopatra Selene of Syria | 102 BC | Ptolemy VI Philometor and Cleopatra II | |
| Antiochus IX Cyzicenus | Cleopatra IV | | Ptolemy VI Philometor and Cleopatra II | |
| Antiochus IX Cyzicenus | Cleopatra Selene of Syria | | Ptolemy VI Philometor and Cleopatra II | |
| Ariarathes VI of Cappadocia | Laodice of Cappadocia | | Pharnaces I of Pontus and Nysa | |
| Ariifaaite | Pōmare IV | 5 December 1832 | Tamatoa IV and Tu-ra’i-ariʻi E-he-vahine | |
| Aristobulus of Chalcis | Salome | | Aristobulus IV and Berenice | |
| Aristobulus IV | Berenice | | Antipater the Idumaean and Cypros | |
| Atsunaga, Emperor Go-Suzaku | Princess Teishi | | Fujiwara no Michinaga and Minamoto no Rinshi | |
| Atsunaga, Emperor Go-Suzaku | Fujiwara no Nariko | | Fujiwara no Michinaga and Minamoto no Rinshi | |
| Pengiran Muda Bahar | Princess Azemah Ni'matul Bolkiah | 12 January 2023 | Omar Ali Saifuddien III and Queen Damit of Brunei | |
| Phra Buddha Loetla Nabhalai | Sri Suriyendra | 1801 | Thongdi, Prince Father and Daoreung | |
| Liu Che, Emperor Wu of Han | Empress Chen Jiao | | Emperor Wen of Han and Empress Dou | |
| Chikahito, Emperor Go-Reizei | Princess Shōshi | | Emperor Ichijō and Empress Shōshi; Fujiwara no Michinaga and Minamoto no Rinshi | |
| Chikahito, Emperor Go-Reizei | Fujiwara no Kanshi | | Fujiwara no Michinaga and Minamoto no Rinshi | |
| Darius | Artaynte | | Darius the Great and Atossa | |
| Fahd bin Salman Al Saud | Nouf bint Khalid bin Abdullah Al Abdul Rahman | | Ibn Saud and Hussa bint Ahmed Al Sudairi | |
| Faisal of Saudi Arabia | Al Jawhara bint Saud bin Abdulaziz Al Saud Al Kabir | October 1935 | Abdul Rahman bin Faisal bin Turki Al Saud and Sara bint Ahmed Al Sudairi | |
| Faisal bin Abdullah bin Mohammed Al Saud | Adila bint Abdullah Al Saud | | Ibn Saud and Fahda bint Asi Al Shuraim | |
| Faisal bin Fahd bin Abdulaziz Al Saud | Munira bint Sultan bin Abdulaziz Al Saud | | Ibn Saud and Hussa bint Ahmed Al Sudairi | |
| Faisal bin Saad bin Abdul Rahman | Qumash bint Abdulaziz Al Saud | | Abdul Rahman bin Faisal bin Turki Al Saud and Sara bint Ahmed Al Sudairi | |
| Faisal bin Saad bin Abdul Rahman | Sara bint Abdulaziz Al Saud | | Abdul Rahman bin Faisal bin Turki Al Saud and Sara bint Ahmed Al Sudairi | |
| Faisal bin Turki I Al Saud | Hassa bint Saud bin Abdulaziz Al Saud | | Ibn Saud and Wadha bint Muhammad bin 'Aqab Al Orair | |
| Ghazi of Iraq | Aliya bint Ali | 25 January 1934 | Hussein bin Ali, King of Hejaz and Abidiya bint Abdullah | |
| Gyeongjong of Goryeo | Queen Heonjeong | | Taejo of Goryeo and Queen Sinjeong | |
| Hamid Mirza | Mah Banu Khanum | 1946 | Mohammad Ali Shah Qajar and Malekeh Jahan | |
| Harun al-Rashid | Zubaidah bint Ja'far | 781–82 CE | Al-Mansur and Arwa | |
| Hassanal Bolkiah | Raja Isteri Pengiran Anak Hajah Saleha | 28 July 1965 | Pengiran Anak Abdul Rahman and Pengiran Fatima | |
| Herod Agrippa | Cypros | | Herod the Great and Mariamne I | |
| Konoe Hisatsugu | Onna-ni-no-miya | | Emperor Go-Yōzei and Konoe Sakiko | |
| Iyasada, Emperor Sanjō | Fujiwara no Kenshi | | Fujiwara no Kaneie and Fujiwara no Tokihime | |
| Jehoash of Judah | Jehoaddan | | Jehoram of Judah and Athaliah | |
| Joseph ben Joseph | Olympias | | Antipater the Idumaean and Cypros | |
| Kanehito, Emperor Ichijō | Empress Shōshi | | Fujiwara no Kaneie and Fujiwara no Tokihime | |
| Kanehito, Emperor Ichijō | Empress Teishi | | Fujiwara no Kaneie and Fujiwara no Tokihime | |
| Kangxi Emperor | Empress Xiaoyiren | | Tong Tulai and Lady Sumuru | |
| Khalid bin Abdullah bin Abdulaziz Al Saud | Noura bint Abdullah bin Muhammad bin Abdullah | | Ibn Saud and Fahda bint Asi Al Shuraim | |
| Khalid bin Hamad Al Khalifa | Hessa bint Mohammed bin Isa Al Khalifa | 8 July 2017 | Isa bin Salman Al Khalifa and Hessa bint Salman Al Khalifa | |
| Khalid bin Sultan Al Saud | Lulua bint Fahd | | Ibn Saud and Hussa bint Ahmed Al Sudairi | |
| Khalid bin Sultan Al Saud | Abeer bint Turki bin Abdulaziz | | Ibn Saud and Hussa bint Ahmed Al Sudairi | |
| Maktoum bin Rashid Al Maktoum | Alia bint Khalifa Al Maktoum | 12 March 1971 | Saeed bin Maktoum bin Hasher Al Maktoum and Sheikha Hessa bint Al Murr | |
| Mithridates III of Commagene | Iotapa | | Antiochus I of Commagene and Isias | |
| Michiyasu, Emperor Montoku | Fujiwara no Akirakeiko | | Fujiwara no Fuyutsugu and Fujiwara no Mitsuko | |
| Michiyasu, Emperor Montoku | Fujiwara no Takakiko | | Fujiwara no Fuyutsugu and Fujiwara no Mitsuko | |
| Prince Mohamed Bolkiah | Pengiran Anak Zariah | August 1970 | Pengiran Anak Abdul Rahman and Pengiran Fatima | |
| Mohammed Nadir Shah | Mah Parwar Begum | | Mohammad Yahya Khan and Hamdan Sultana Begum | |
| Pengiran Anak Mohammad Yusof | Princess Nor'ain of Brunei | 18 August 1967 | Pengiran Anak Abdul Rahman and Pengiran Fatima | |
| Mohammed Zahir Shah | Humaira Begum | 7 November 1931 | Muhammad Asif Khan and Murwarid Begum | |
| Mohammed bin Rashid Al Maktoum | Hind bint Maktoum Al Maktoum | 1979 | Saeed bin Maktoum bin Hasher Al Maktoum and Sheikha Hessa bint Al Murr | |
| Morihira, Emperor En'yū | Fujiwara no Senshi | | Fujiwara no Morosuke and Fujiwara no Seishi | |
| Morihira, Emperor En'yū | Fujiwara no Koshi | | Fujiwara no Morosuke and Fujiwara no Seishi | |
| Muhammad bin Abdulaziz Al Saud | Sara bint Saad bin Abdul Rahman Al Saud | | Abdul Rahman bin Faisal bin Turki Al Saud and Sara bint Ahmed Al Sudairi | |
| Muhammad bin Fahd Al Saud | Jawahir bint Nayef bin Abdulaziz Al Saud | | Ibn Saud and Hussa bint Ahmed Al Sudairi | |
| Muhammad bin Nayef | Reema bint Sultan | | Ibn Saud and Hussa bint Ahmed Al Sudairi | |
| Muhammad Azam Shah | Jahanzeb Banu Begum | 3 January 1669 | Shah Jahan and Mumtaz Mahal | |
| Mitsuhito, Emperor Shijō | Kujō Genshi | | Kujō Michiie and Sainonji Rinshi | |
| Munehito, Emperor Toba | Fujiwara no Tamako | | Fujiwara no Sanesue and Fujiwara no Mutsuko | |
| Norihira, Emperor Reizei | Princess Masako | | Emperor Daigo and Fujiwara no Onshi | |
| Norihira, Emperor Reizei | Fujiwara no Kaishi | | Fujiwara no Morosuke and Fujiwara no Seishi | |
| Norihira, Emperor Reizei | Fujiwara no Chōshi | | Fujiwara no Morosuke and Fujiwara no Seishi | |
| Takatsukasa Norihira | Princess Seishi | | Emperor Go-Yōzei and Konoe Sakiko | |
| Prince Osakabe | Princess Asuka | | Emperor Jomei and Empress Kōgyoku | |
| Prince Ōtomo | Princess Tōchi | | Emperor Jomei and Empress Kōgyoku | |
| Phasael II | Salampsio | | Antipater the Idumaean and Cypros | |
| Pōmare II | Tetuanui Tarovahine | March 1797 | Teu and Tetupaia i Hauiri | |
| Prajadhipok | Rambai Barni | August 1918 | Mongkut and Piyamavadi | |
| Purachatra Jayakara | Prabhavasit Narimol | 16 November 1904 | Mongkut and Debsirindra | |
| Salahuddin of Selangor | Raja Nur Saidatul-Ihsan | 1943 | Sulaiman of Selangor and Cik Puan Hasnah | |
| Salman of Saudi Arabia | Sultana bint Turki Al Sudairi | 1954 | Ahmed bin Mohammed Al Sudairi and Sharifa bint Ali bin Mohammed Al Suwaidi | |
| Salman bin Sultan Al Saud | Falwa bint Ahmed bin Abdulaziz Al Saud | | Ibn Saud and Hussa bint Ahmed Al Sudairi | |
| Xue Shao | Princess Taiping | | Emperor Taizong of Tang and Empress Zhangsun | |
| Prince Shiki | Princess Taki | | Emperor Jomei and Empress Kōgyoku | |
| Sipihr Shikoh | Zubdat-un-Nissa Begum | 30 January 1673 | Shah Jahan and Mumtaz Mahal | |
| Sultan Mahomed Shah, Aga Khan III | Shahzadi Begum | 2 November 1896 | Aga Khan I and Sarv-i Jahan Khanum | |
| Takahito, Emperor Go-Sanjō | Princess Kaoruko | | Emperor Ichijō and Empress Shōshi; Fujiwara no Michinaga and Minamoto no Rinshi | |
| Talal of Jordan | Zein al-Sharaf bint Jamil | 27 November 1934 | Amir Nasser Pasha and Dilber Khanum | |
| Taw Phaya | Phaya Rita | 4 May 1944 | Thibaw Min and Supayalat | |
| Prince Takechi | Princess Minabe | | Emperor Jomei and Empress Kōgyoku | |
| Teriʻihinoiatua Pōmare | Teriimaevarua III | 9 January 1884 | Pōmare IV and Ariifaaite | |
| Theyazin bin Haitham Al Said | Meyyan bint Shihab Al Said | 11 November 2021 | Tariq bin Taimur Al Said and Shawana bint Hamud Al Busaidiyah | |
| Thuwaini bin Said | Ghaliya bint Salim Al-Busaidiyah | | Sultan bin Ahmad and Sayyida Ghanneyeh bint Saif Al-Busaidi | |
| Vajiralongkorn | Soamsawali | 3 January 1977 | Nakkhatra Mangala and Bua Kitiyakara | |
| Xerxes I | Amestris | | Hystaspes and Rhodogune | |
| Yohito, Emperor Go-Uda | Princess Reishi | | Emperor Go-Saga and Saionji Kisshi | |
| Yuan Baoji, Emperor Wen of Western Wei | Empress Yifu | 525 | Emperor Xiaowen of Northern Wei and Consort Yuan | |
| Yugala Dighambara | Chalermkhetra Mangala | | Mongkut and Debsirindra | |
| Zaitian, Guangxu Emperor | Jingfen, Empress Dowager Longyu | 26 February 1889 | Huizheng and Lady Fuca | |

== Aristocracy ==
| Husband | Wife | Married | Shared grandparents | Ref(s) |
|---|---|---|---|---|
| Francisco de Borbón y de la Torre | Enriqueta de Borbón y Parade, 4th Duchess of Seville | 21 August 1907 | Infante Enrique, Duke of Seville and Elena María de Castellví y Shelly | |
| Edmund Boyle, 8th Earl of Cork | Isabella Henrietta Poyntz | 9 October 1795 | Kelland Courtenay and Hon. Elizabeth Montagu | |
| Lionel Boyle, 3rd Earl of Orrery | Mary Sackville | 23 February 1692 | Richard Sackville, 5th Earl of Dorset and Lady Frances Cranfield | |
| William Brodrick, 7th Viscount Midleton | The Hon. Harriet Brodrick | 31 March 1829 | George Brodrick, 3rd Viscount Midleton and Albinia Townshend | |
| Theobald Butler, 1st Viscount Butler of Tulleophelim | Lady Elizabeth Preston | February 1603 | James Butler, 9th Earl of Ormond and Lady Joan Fitzgerald | |
| Hon. John Byron | Sophia Trevanion | 8 September 1748 | William Berkeley, 4th Baron Berkeley of Stratton and Frances Temple | |
| Hon. William Byron | Juliana Elizabeth Byron | 1771 | William Byron, 4th Baron Byron and Hon. Frances Berkeley | |
| Frederick William Cadogan | Lady Adelaide Paget | 29 November 1851 | Charles Cadogan, 1st Earl Cadogan and Mary Churchill | |
| Walter Frederick Campbell | Lady Eleanor Charteris | 14 January 1820 | Walter Campbell of Shawfield and Eleanor Kerr | |
| George Cathcart | Lady Georgiana Greville | 12 May 1824 | Charles Cathcart, 9th Lord Cathcart and Jane Hamilton | |
| Lord Edward Cavendish | Emma Lascelles | 3 August 1865 | George Howard, 6th Earl of Carlisle and Lady Georgiana Cavendish | |
| Bernard Coleridge, 2nd Baron Coleridge | Mary Mackarness | 3 August 1876 | John Taylor Coleridge and Mary Buchanan | |
| Diego Colón de Toledo, 4th Admiral of the Indies | Felipa Colón de Toledo, 2nd Duchess of Veragua | | Diego Columbus and María de Toledo | |
| William Wirich, Count of Daun-Falkenstein | Elisabeth of Waldeck-Wildungen | 28 November 1634 | John VII, Count of Nassau-Siegen and Magdalene of Waldeck-Wildungen | |
| Henry de Nassau d'Auverquerque, 1st Earl of Grantham | Lady Henrietta Butler | 12 January 1697 | Louis of Nassau, Lord of De Lek and Beverweerd and Countess Isabella of Hornes | |
| David Dawnay | Lady Katharine de la Poer Beresford | 14 October 1926 | John Beresford, 5th Marquess of Waterford and Lady Blanche Somerset | |
| Henri de La Trémoille, 3rd Duke of Thouars | Marie de La Tour d'Auvergne | 18 February 1619 | William the Silent and Charlotte of Bourbon | |
| Christopher I, Burgrave and Count of Dohna-Schlodien | Frede (Frederica) Marie von Dohna | 18 November 1690 | Christopher von Dohna and Ursula of Solms-Braunfels | |
| Cospatrick Douglas-Home, 11th Earl of Home | Hon. Lucy Elizabeth Montagu-Scott | 4 December 1832 | Henry Scott, 3rd Duke of Buccleuch and Lady Elizabeth Montagu | |
| John Douglas-Scott-Montagu, 2nd Baron Montagu of Beaulieu | Lady Cecil Kerr | 4 June 1889 | Walter Montagu Douglas Scott, 5th Duke of Buccleuch and Lady Charlotte Thynne | |
| James Dutton, 3rd Baron Sherborne | Lady Elizabeth Howard | 22 June 1826 | James Dutton, 1st Baron Sherborne and Elizabeth Coke | |
| William FitzClarence, 2nd Earl of Munster | Wilhelmina Kennedy-Erskine | 17 April 1855 | William IV and Dorothea Jordan | |
| The Hon. Dudley Fortescue | Lady Camilla Wallop | 8 June 1852 | Hugh Fortescue, 1st Earl Fortescue and Hester Grenville | |
| Robert Fulke Greville | Louisa Cathcart, 2nd Countess of Mansfield | 19 October 1797 | Lord Archibald Hamilton and Lady Jane Hamilton | |
| Booth Grey | Lady Sophia Grey | 21 October 1809 | Harry Grey, 4th Earl of Stamford and Lady Mary Booth | |
| George Grey, 8th Baron Grey of Groby | Lady Katherine Charteris Wemyss | 20 December 1824 | Francis Charteris, Lord Elcho and Susan Keck | |
| Hugh Grosvenor, 1st Duke of Westminster | Lady Constance Leveson-Gower | 28 April 1852 | George Leveson-Gower, 1st Duke of Sutherland and Elizabeth Gordon, 19th Countess of Sutherland | |
| John Hamilton, 1st Marquess of Abercorn | Lady Cecil Hamilton | 4 March 1792 | James Hamilton, 7th Earl of Abercorn and Anne Plumer | |
| John Hamilton, 3rd Earl of Selkirk | Lady Anne Kennedy | 21 June 1694 | James Hamilton, 1st Duke of Hamilton and Margaret Feilding, Duchess of Hamilton | |
| George Harcourt, 2nd Earl Harcourt | Hon. Elizabeth Venables-Vernon | 26 September 1765 | Hon. Simon Harcourt and Elizabeth Evelyn | |
| Michael Hare, 2nd Viscount Blakenham | Marcia Persephone Hare | 12 January 1965 | Richard Hare, 4th Earl of Listowel and Freda Vanden-Bempde-Johnstone | |
| Charles Hepburn-Stuart-Forbes-Trefusis, 20th Baron Clinton | Harriet Williamina Hepburn-Forbes | 29 July 1858 | William Kerr, 6th Marquess of Lothian and Lady Harriet Scott | |
| Henry Herbert, 4th Earl of Carnarvon | Elizabeth Howard | 26 December 1878 | Lord Henry Howard-Molyneux-Howard and Elizabeth Long | |
| George Herbert, 11th Earl of Pembroke | Elizabeth Beauclerk | 8 April 1787 | Charles Spencer, 3rd Duke of Marlborough and Hon. Elizabeth Trevor | |
| John Holles, 1st Duke of Newcastle | Lady Margaret Cavendish | 1 March 1690 | William Pierrepont and Elizabeth Harries | |
| Henry Howard, 11th Earl of Suffolk | Catherine Graham | 5 March 1709 | William Howard and Elizabeth Dundas | |
| Francis Keith-Falconer, 8th Earl of Kintore | Louisa Madeleine Hawkins | 24 June 1851 | Francis Hawkins and Helen Dempster Burrington | |
| William Kerr, 2nd Marquess of Lothian | Lady Jean Campbell | June 1685 | Archibald Campbell, 1st Marquess of Argyll and Lady Margaret Douglas | |
| Robert King, 1st Viscount Lorton | Lady Frances Parsons | 9 December 1799 | Edward King, 1st Earl of Kingston and Jane Caulfeild | |
| Thomas Knox, 1st Earl of Ranfurly | The Hon. Diana Jane Pery | 2 June 1785 | John Vesey, 1st Baron Knapton and Elizabeth Brownlow | |
| Henry Labouchere, 1st Baron Taunton | Frances Baring | 10 April 1840 | Sir Francis Baring, 1st Baronet and Harriet Herring | |
| John Leslie-Melville, 9th Earl of Leven | Harriet Thornton | 15 September 1812 | John Thornton and Lucy Watson | |
| John Leslie-Melville, 9th Earl of Leven | Sophia Thornton | 23 April 1834 | John Thornton and Lucy Watson | |
| John Manners-Sutton | Anne Manners | April 1778 | John Manners, 3rd Duke of Rutland and The Hon. Bridget Sutton | |
| George Monckton-Arundell, 6th Viscount Galway | Henrietta Maria Milnes | 25 April 1838 | Robert Monckton-Arundell, 4th Viscount Galway and Elizabeth Mathew | |
| George Murray, 5th Earl of Dunmore | Lady Susan Hamilton | 3 August 1803 | Alexander Stewart, 6th Earl of Galloway and Lady Catherine Cochrane | |
| James Murray | Lady Catherine Stewart | 12 April 1751 | James Stewart, 5th Earl of Galloway and Lady Catherine Montgomerie | |
| John Murray, 3rd Duke of Atholl | Charlotte Murray, Duchess of Atholl | 23 October 1753 | John Murray, 1st Duke of Atholl and Lady Katherine Hamilton | |
| Henry Edward Napier | Caroline Bennet | 17 November 1823 | Charles Lennox, 2nd Duke of Richmond and Sarah Cadogan | |
| Baptist Noel, 3rd Earl of Gainsborough | Lady Dorothy Manners | 1706 | Baptist Noel, 3rd Viscount Campden and Lady Elizabeth Bertie | |
| Henry O'Brien, 7th Earl of Thomond | Lady Anne O'Brien | 1641 | Donogh O'Brien, 4th Earl of Thomond and Lady Elizabeth FitzGerald | |
| Murrough O'Brien, 1st Marquess of Thomond | Mary O'Brien, 3rd Countess of Orkney | 1753 | William O'Brien, 3rd Earl of Inchiquin and Mary Villiers | |
| William O'Brien, 4th Earl of Inchiquin | Anne Douglas-Hamilton, 2nd Countess of Orkney | 29 March 1720 | Sir Edward Villiers and Lady Frances Howard | |
| Lord George Paget | Agnes Charlotte Paget | 27 February 1854 | Henry Paget, 1st Earl of Uxbridge and Jane Champagné | |
| Henry Pelham-Clinton, 2nd Duke of Newcastle | Catherine Pelham | 16 October 1744 | Thomas Pelham, 1st Baron Pelham and Lady Grace Holles | |
| John Petty, 1st Earl of Shelburne | Mary FitzMaurice | 16 February 1734 | William FitzMaurice, 20th Baron Kerry and Constance Long | |
| Charles Ponsonby, 2nd Baron de Mauley | Lady Maria Ponsonby | 9 August 1838 | Frederick Ponsonby, 3rd Earl of Bessborough and Lady Henrietta Spencer | |
| Henry Reynolds-Moreton, 3rd Earl of Ducie | Julia Langston | 24 May 1849 | Thomas Reynolds-Moreton, 1st Earl of Ducie and Lady Frances Herbert | |
| Robert Rich, 3rd Earl of Warwick | Anne Cheeke | 5 October 1645 | Robert Rich, 1st Earl of Warwick and Lady Penelope Devereux | |
| Anselm Salomon von Rothschild | Charlotte Nathan Rothschild | 1826 | Mayer Amschel Rothschild and Guttle Schnapper | |
| Lionel de Rothschild | Charlotte von Rothschild | 15 June 1836 | Mayer Amschel Rothschild and Guttle Schnapper | |
| Mayer Carl von Rothschild | Louise von Rothschild | 6 April 1842 | Mayer Amschel Rothschild and Guttle Schnapper | |
| Nathan Rothschild, 1st Baron Rothschild | Baroness Emma von Rothschild | 16 April 1867 | Nathan Mayer Rothschild and Hannah Barent Cohen; Carl Mayer von Rothschild and Adelheid Herz | |
| Nathaniel de Rothschild | Charlotte de Rothschild | 17 August 1842 | Mayer Amschel Rothschild and Guttle Schnapper | |
| Edward Russell, 1st Earl of Orford | Lady Margaret Russell | 12 November 1691 | Francis Russell, 4th Earl of Bedford and Catherine Brydges | |
| Lord Wriothesley Russell | Elizabeth Russell | 23 June 1829 | Francis Russell, Marquess of Tavistock and Lady Elizabeth Keppel | |
| Granville Ryder | Lady Georgiana Somerset | 30 May 1825 | Granville Leveson-Gower, 1st Marquess of Stafford and Lady Susanna Stewart | |
| Lionel Sackville-West, 3rd Baron Sackville | Victoria Sackville-West, Baroness Sackville | 17 June 1890 | George Sackville-West, 5th Earl De La Warr and Elizabeth Sackville, 1st Baroness Buckhurst | |
| Pedro Sánchez de Tagle, 2nd Marquis of Altamira | Luisa Sánchez de Tagle | | Don Anselmo Sánchez de Tagle and Juliana de la Rasa Barreda | |
| Władysław Hieronim Sanguszko | Izabela Maria Lubomirska | 6 July 1829 | Józef Klemens Czartoryski and Dorota Barbara Jabłonowska | |
| John Scott, 4th Earl of Eldon | The Hon. Magdalen Fraser | 10 April 1934 | Simon Fraser, 13th Lord Lovat and Alice Maria Weld-Blundell | |
| Francisco Serrano, 1st Duke of la Torre | Antonia Domínguez y Borrell | 29 September 1850 | Miguel María Domínguez Guevara Vasconcellos y Albuquerque and Antonia De Guevara-Vasconcelos y Alburquerque | |
| Edward Smith-Stanley, 13th Earl of Derby | Charlotte Margaret Hornby | 30 June 1798 | James Smith-Stanley, Lord Strange and Lucy Smith | |
| John Henry Smyth | Lady Elizabeth FitzRoy | 18 April 1814 | Augustus FitzRoy, 3rd Duke of Grafton and Hon. Anne Liddell | |
| Lord Arthur John Henry Somerset | Hon. Elizabeth Boscawen | 23 June 1808 | Hon. Edward Boscawen and Frances Glanville | |
| John Spencer | Lady Elizabeth Spencer | 5 February 1790 | Charles Spencer, 3rd Duke of Marlborough and Hon. Elizabeth Trevor | |
| George Spencer-Churchill, 6th Duke of Marlborough | Lady Jane Stewart | 13 January 1819 | John Stewart, 7th Earl of Galloway and Anne Dashwood | |
| George Spencer-Churchill, 6th Duke of Marlborough | Jane Stewart | 18 October 1851 | John Stewart, 7th Earl of Galloway and Anne Dashwood | |
| James Stopford, 4th Earl of Courtown | Lady Charlotte Montagu-Scott | 4 July 1822 | Henry Scott, 3rd Duke of Buccleuch and Lady Elizabeth Montagu | |
| Henry Sturt, 1st Baron Alington | Lady Augusta Bingham | 10 September 1853 | Robert Brudenell, 6th Earl of Cardigan and Penelope Brudenell, Countess of Cardigan | |
| Ralph Tollemache | Caroline Tollemache | 15 February 1853 | William Tollemache, Lord Huntingtower and Catherine Gray, Lady Manners | |
| William Tollemache, Lord Huntingtower | Katherine Elizabeth Camilla Burke | 26 September 1851 | William Tollemache, Lord Huntingtower and Catherine Gray, Lady Manners | |
| Toyotomi Hideyori | Senhime | 1603 | Azai Nagamasa and Oichi | |
| William Vane, 1st Duke of Cleveland | Lady Catherine Powlett | 17 September 1787 | Robert Lowther and Katherine Pennington | |
| George Waldegrave, 4th Earl Waldegrave | Elizabeth Waldegrave, Countess Waldegrave | 5 May 1782 | James Waldegrave, 1st Earl Waldegrave and Mary Webb | |
| William Waldegrave, 9th Earl Waldegrave | Lady Mary Palmer | 5 August 1874 | William Waldegrave, 8th Earl Waldegrave and Elizabeth Whitbread | |
| Lewis Watson, 2nd Earl of Rockingham | Catherine Furnese | 10 April 1736 | Lewis Watson, 1st Earl of Rockingham and Catherine Sondes | |
| Hon. Edward Ward | Lady Arabella Crosbie | 15 February 1783 | John Bligh, 1st Earl of Darnley and Theodosia Bligh, 10th Baroness Clifton | |
| Charles Wentworth-Fitzwilliam, 5th Earl Fitzwilliam | Hon. Mary Dundas | 8 July 1806 | William Fitzwilliam, 3rd Earl Fitzwilliam and Lady Anne Watson-Wentworth | |
| Other Windsor, 5th Earl of Plymouth | Hon. Sarah Archer | 20 May 1778 | Thomas Archer, 1st Baron Archer and Catherine Tipping | |

== See also ==
- Avunculate marriage
- Consanguinity
- Cousin marriage
- Marriage
