= Fujiwara no Kanshi =

Fujiwara no Kanshi 藤原歓子

Empress consort of Japan
- Tenure: 1068–1074

Empress dowager of Japan
- Tenure: 1074–1102
- Born: 1021
- Died: 1102 (aged 80–81)
- Spouse: Emperor Go-Reizei
- House: Imperial House of Japan
- Father: Fujiwara no Norimichi
- Mother: Fujiwara no Kintō

Fujiwara no Kanshi (藤原歓子; 1021–1102), also known as Ono no Kōtaigō (小野皇太后) was an empress consort of Emperor Go-Reizei of Japan. Her given name can also be read Yoshiko.

== Biography ==
She was the third daughter of Fujiwara no Norimichi. Her mother was the eldest daughter of Fujiwara no Kintō. In 1024, when Kanshi was only four years old, her mother died.

=== Consort ===
In 1047, after the enthronement of Emperor Go-Reizei, Kanshi entered his court. In 1049, they had a son, but he was either stillborn or died shortly after birth.

After Fujiwara no Hiroko entered the court in 1050, Hiroko was proclaimed empress consort in spite of Kanshi's seniority, and Kanshi began to seclude herself in her estate. From 1051 onward, she lived with her brother Jōen, a monk, in Ono at the base of Mount Hiei, spending her days in Buddhist prayer.

According to the Eiga Monogatari, Kanshi was known as a small and graceful beauty, proficient with the biwa and at painting, particularly in the Tang style. Although she was the only one of Go-Reizei's wives who ever bore him a child, Princess Shōshi was protected by the emperor's grandmother Jōtōmon-in, and Fujiwara no Hiroko was the daughter of the long-established regent Fujiwara no Yorimichi, and so those two dominated the harem. Fortune never favored her until right before the death of her husband.

In 1068, with the Emperor on his deathbed, Kanshi was finally named kōgō. This came on top of the investitures of Princess Teishi as grand empress dowager, and of the Emperor's other wives Princess Shōshi and Fujiwara no Hiroko as kōtaigō and chūgū respectively. This meant that, for the first time, the Emperor now had three empresses consort at once: Shōshi, Hiroko, and Kanshi. On the same day, Fujiwara no Yorimichi yielded the position of kampaku to his younger brother Norimichi, Kanshi's father. Just two days later, Emperor Go-Reizei died, and with the opposition of his successor Emperor Go-Sanjō, the regent family went into decline.

=== Later life ===
In 1074, Kanshi gained the title of empress dowager, and in 1077 she became a nun. In 1102 she became sick, and died three months later in her mountain retreat in Ono at the age of 82.

A famous anecdote states that in 1091, late in Kanshi's life, as she was living out her remaining days at her retreat in Ono, the retired Emperor Shirakawa suddenly resolved to go snow-viewing and came by to visit. Hearing of this from an attendant, Kanshi stated that it would not do to make one who came for a snow-viewing come indoors, and attractively arranged some seats in the garden. Admiring her resourcefulness and the grace of her entertainment, the ex-emperor is said to have awarded her an estate in Mino province.

Japanese royalty
Preceded by Fujiwara no Hiroko	Empress consort of Japan; 1068–1074	Succeeded by Princess Kaoruko
Preceded by Fujiwara no Shigeko (granted title posthumously)	Empress dowager of Japan; 1074–1102	Succeeded by Fujiwara no Kenshi (granted title posthumously)
