= Fujiwara no Ishi =

Fujiwara no Ishi 藤原威子

Empress consort of Japan
- Tenure: November 16, 1018 – September 4, 1036
- Born: February 1, 1000
- Died: September 28, 1036 (aged 36)
- Spouse: Emperor Go-Ichijō
- Issue: Princess Shōshi; Princess Kaoruko
- House: Fujiwara clan (by birth); Imperial House of Japan (by marriage)
- Father: Fujiwara no Michinaga
- Mother: Minamoto no Michiko

Fujiwara no Ishi (藤原威子) (February 1, 1000–September 28, 1036) was the empress consort of Emperor Go-Ichijō of Japan.

== Biography ==
She was the third daughter of Fujiwara no Michinaga. At the manor, she was trained by her older brother, Yorimichi, to be the empress.

In 1018, at the age of nineteen, she married her ten-year-old nephew the Emperor and became Empress (Chugu), and thus the third of her sisters to become Empresses in succession, all in marriages arranged by their father the regent. Shoshi was the Grand Empress Dowager, Kenshi was the Empress Dowager, she was the Empress and her younger sister, Kishi was the Crown Princess. Kenshi and Kishi died soon, and these tragedies leave deep wounds on her family. She was reportedly embarrassed to marry the emperor because she was nine years his senior, and because he was her nephew. However, the marriage was arranged mainly for matters of politics and status, and she was expected to fulfill a ceremonial role. Even her brothers were reportedly surprised when the emperor chose to consummate the marriage, and it resulted in two daughters.

Issue

- Imperial Princess Akiko/Shōshi (章子内親王) (Nijō-In, 二条院) (1026–1105), Empress (chūgū) to Emperor Go-Reizei
- Imperial Princess Kaoruko/Keishi (馨子内親王) (1029–1093), Empress (chūgū) to Emperor Go-Sanjō

On September 4, the same year of Emperor Go-Ichijō's passing, she took tonsure as a Buddhist nun. She died two days later at the age of 36.

== Notes ==
Japanese royalty
Preceded by Fujiwara no Kenshi	Empress consort of Japan; 1018–1036	Succeeded by Princess Teishi
