= Fujiwara no Hiroko =

Empress consort of Japan
- Tenure: 1051–1069

Empress dowager of Japan
- Tenure: 1069–1074
- Born: 1036
- Died: 1127 (aged 90–91); Uji
- Spouse: Emperor Go-Reizei
- House: Imperial House of Japan
- Father: Fujiwara no Yorimichi
- Mother: Fujiwara no Gishi

Fujiwara no Hiroko (藤原寛子; 1036–1127), also known as Shijō no Miya (四条宮), was an empress consort of Emperor Go-Reizei. She was the eldest daughter of Fujiwara no Yorimichi and Fujiwara no Gishi. Fujiwara no Morozane was her brother by the same mother.

== Biography ==
At the time, the matrilineal bloodline was very important in Japanese noble society. Hiroko's mother Gishi's hazy background might have put her at a disadvantage, but to her father she was a long-awaited daughter.

=== Empress ===
Especially after the early death of her adopted sister Fujiwara no Genshi in 1039, Yorimichi expected Hiroko to give birth to an imperial prince, and so sent her to the court of Emperor Go-Reizei in 1050. A year later, in 1051, she became kōgō. Normally, the existing imperial wife Princess Shōshi would have taken the position, but Shōshi remained in the position of chūgū by her own preference. With her father's powerful protection, Hiroko maintained a flashy palace and held poetry competitions. However, despite her father's great expectations and the Emperor's affection, Hiroko proved unable to bear children. In 1068, Fujiwara no Kanshi became a kōgō, and Hiroko took the position of chūgū. After Emperor Go-Reizei's death in the same year, Hiroko became a nun.

=== Later life ===
By her later years in the early 12th century, the golden age of the Sekkan system was past. However, Hiroko's connection to its central figures, including her father Yorimichi and her aunt Fujiwara no Shōshi, earned her respect from her family as a remnant of that tradition.

Fujiwara no Hiroko died in her secondary residence in Uji in 1127, at the age of 91. She was the longest-living empress dowager of Japan before Empress Nagako breaking the record in 1995.

== Notes ==
Japanese royalty
Preceded by Princess Shōshi	Empress consort of Japan; 1051–1069	Succeeded by Fujiwara no Kanshi
Preceded by Princess Shōshi	Empress dowager of Japan; 1069–1074	Succeeded by Fujiwara no Shigeko (granted title posthumously)
