= Fujiwara no Yoshiko =

Fujiwara no Yoshiko was (or may have been) the name of several women in Japan in the Heian and Kamakura periods:

- Fujiwara no Kenshi (Sanjō) (c.994–1027), consort of Emperor Sanjō
- Fujiwara no Kanshi (1021–1102), consort of Emperor Go-Reizei
- Fujiwara no Kisshi (1225–1292), consort of Emperor Go-Saga
