= Kōhei =

Period of Japanese history (1058–1065 CE)

Kōhei (康平) was a Japanese era (年号, nengō; literally "year name") after Tengi and before Jiryaku. This period spanned the years from August 1058 through August 1065. The reigning emperor was Go-Reizei-tennō (後冷泉天皇).

== Change of era ==
- 1058 Kōhei gannen (康平元年) : The new era name was created to mark an event or series of events. The previous era ended and the new one commenced in Tengi 6, on the 29th day of the 8th month of 1058.

== Events of the Kōhei era ==
- 1060 (Kōhei 3, 27th day of the 11th month): A broom star was observed in the south for seven nights.

== Notes ==
Preceded by Tengi	Era or nengō Kōhei; 1058–1065	Succeeded by Jiryaku
