= Princess Shōshi (1027–1105) =

Shōshi

Empress consort of Japan
- Tenure: 1046–1068

Empress dowager of Japan
- Tenure: 1068–1069

Grand empress dowager of Japan
- Tenure: 1069–1105
- Born: 19 January 1027
- Died: 26 October 1105 (aged 78)
- Burial: Bodaijuin no Misasagi (菩提樹院陵) (Kyoto)
- Spouse: Emperor Go-Reizei
- House: Imperial House of Japan
- Father: Emperor Go-Ichijō
- Mother: Fujiwara no Ishi

Princess Shōshi (章子内親王, Shōshi naishinnō; 19 January 1027 – 26 October 1105), also known as Nijō-in (二条院), was an empress consort of Japan. She was the consort of her cousin Emperor Go-Reizei. She was the eldest daughter of Emperor Go-Ichijō and Fujiwara no Ishi, and the sister of Princess Kaoruko.

== Biography ==
Shōshi was proclaimed a princess shortly after her birth. Emperor Go-Ichijō had hoped for a son, but as his first child, Shōshi was much loved by both of her parents. She is said to have been a docile and beautiful princess. In 1030, along with her chakko (着袴) ceremony, she was conferred the rank of jusangū, first rank (准三宮・一品). In 1036, both of her parents died one after another, leaving her orphaned at a young age. She matured under the patronage of her grandmother, Jōtōmon-in.

=== Consort ===
After the death of Fujiwara no Michinaga, his sons used the imperial harem as a stage for political competition. With Fujiwara no Yorimichi's daughter still very young, it is thought that Shōshi may have been used as a sort of compromise candidate due to Jōtōmon-in's connection with Michinaga's family. In 1037, undergoing the rite of chakumo (着裳), she entered the court of her cousin, then-crown prince Chikahito, the future Emperor Go-Reizei, as crown princess.

In 1045, she became a court lady as Chikahito ascended to the throne, and in 1046, Shōshi assumed the rank of chūgū. The Eiga Monogatari records that later, when Yorimichi's daughter Hiroko joined the court, Princess Shōshi preferred to remain in the rank of chūgū, instead of becoming kōgō as was usual. This may have been a response to an incident in which the previous emperor Go-Suzaku's chūgū Princess Teishi, Shōshi's cousin, was pushed into the position of kōgō by the entry of Yorimichi's adopted daughter Genshi as chūgū and wound up alienated from the court. Even so, the naturally calm Shōshi expressed no dissatisfaction as her husband the emperor favored his other wives, and thus maintained a peaceful relationship with Yorimichi's faction. She never bore any children.

=== Later life ===
In 1068, Go-Reizei died, and in 1069, Shōshi cut her hair to become a nun. She assumed the rank of Grand Empress Dowager, and in 1074 became known as Nijō-in by imperial proclamation. She died in 1105, at age 80.

Princess Shōshi's mausoleum, along with her father's, is at Bodaijuin no Misasagi in Kyoto.

Japanese royalty
Preceded by Fujiwara no Genshi	Empress consort of Japan; 1046–1068	Succeeded by Fujiwara no Hiroko
Preceded by Princess Teishi	Empress dowager of Japan; 1068–1069	Succeeded by Fujiwara no Hiroko
Preceded by Princess Teishi	Grand empress dowager of Japan; 1069–1105	Succeeded by Princess Reishi
