= Jiryaku =

Period of Japanese history (1065–1069 CE)

Jiryaku (治暦) was a Japanese era name (年号, nengō; lit. "year name") after Kōhei and before Enkyū. This period spanned the years from August 1065 through April 1069. The reigning emperors were Go-Reizei-tennō (後冷泉天皇) and Go-Sanjō-tennō (後三条天皇).

== Change of Era ==
- 1065 Jiryaku gannen (治暦元年): The new era name was created to mark an event or series of events. The previous era ended and the new one commenced in Kōhei 8, 2nd day of the 8th month of 1065.

== Events of the Jiryaku Era ==
- April 3, 1066 (Jiryaku 2, 6th day of the 3rd month): Halley's comet appeared in the east at first light.
- 1068 (Jiryaku 4, 14th day of the 8th month): Ceremonies for starting construction on rebuilding the Coronation Hall, which had been destroyed by fire.
- 1068 (Jiryaku 4, 19th day of the 4th month): In the 4th year of Emperor Go-Reizei's reign (後冷泉天皇4年), he died at age 44; and the succession (senso) was received by his son. Shortly thereafter, Emperor Go-Sanjo is said to have acceded to the throne (sokui).

== Notes ==
Preceded by Kōhei	Era or nengō Jiryaku; 1065–1069	Succeeded by Enkyū
