= Princess Teishi =

Teishi

Empress consort of Japan
- Tenure: 1037–1051

Empress dowager of Japan
- Tenure: 1051–1068

Grand empress dowager of Japan
- Tenure: 1068–1094
- Born: August 15, 1013
- Died: February 3, 1094 (aged 80)
- Spouse: Emperor Go-Suzaku (m. 1027; died 1045)
- Issue: Princess Nagako; Princess Kenshi; Emperor Go-Sanjō
- House: Imperial House of Japan
- Father: Emperor Sanjō
- Mother: Fujiwara no Kenshi

Princess Teishi (禎子内親王, Teishi Naishinnō; August 15, 1013 – February 3, 1094), also known as Yōmeimon-in (陽明門院), was an empress consort of Emperor Go-Suzaku of Japan. She wielded major influence during the reign of her son, Emperor Go Sanjo (1068-1073), but she was de facto ruler from 1073 to 1094, during the early reign of Emperor Shirakawa.

== Biography ==
She was the third daughter of Emperor Sanjō and the mother of Emperor Go-Sanjō. In 1023, she had her coming of age ceremony, and was elevated to the title of First Princess. In 1027, she married her cousin, the Crown Prince. Reportedly, she cried miserably at her wedding because she didn’t want to marry the prince. Not long after, her mother, Empress Dowager Kenshi, died, but Grand Empress Dowager Shoshi cared for her. She was also adored by the powerful chief minister Michinaga. Once she gave birth to Prince Takahito in 1032, it helped to secure the Crown Princess's position. During her tenure as crown princess, she was her husband’s only wife, which was rare at that time. It seems that they became an affectionate couple.

=== Empress ===
In 1036, when her husband became Emperor, she was made his Secondary Empress, and promoted to Principal Empress the following year. In 1037, however, Fujiwara no Genshi, daughter of Fujiwara no Yorimichi, was made Secondary Empress and became the Emperors favorite, and Teishi was no longer allowed to enter the Inner Imperial Palace. This soured relations between Teishi and Yorimichi. In 1039, Geishi died, and Teishi was allowed back to the Imperial Palace, which she originally refused, but finally she returned to the palace in 1042. At that time, she was the sole empress but Norimichi wanted to make his own daughter, Consort Seishi empress but this was prevented by Empress Teishi’s faction. Despite being empress, Consort Senshi was the most favored consort of the emperor. But the Crown Prince Chikahito was the official stepson of Teishi and she raised him in the past so her position was secured.

=== Later life ===
In 1045, her husband died. Teishi was given the title of Empress Dowager. But her relationship with her stepson became tense, and shortly after enthronement, Emperor Go Suzaku forbade her mother to see her daughter who was involved in a scandal at that time. As Empress Dowager, her biggest concern was to ensure the succession of her son, Crown Prince Takahito. Regent Yorimichi humiliated him constantly and the regent had considerable influence on the emperor. So Teishi started to organize a political faction with high ranked nobility to protect and support the crown prince. In the meantime, Yorimichi arranged for her daughter, Hiroko to become Empress in 1051, with the intention of creating a new heir who could replace Teishi’s son. But Hiroko didn’t become pregnant, so Teishi’s son remained the crown prince.

In 1068, her son succeeded to the throne, and Teishi became Grand Empress Dowager with full power, as Shoshi gave her all privileges to Teishi. The new policy was the ending of Sekkan-e (when a regent rules instead of the emperor) but as a compromise Norimichi was appointed regent, thus Teishi finally removed Yorimichi from office. Teishi raised her grandchildren born by Princess Moshi (the deceased wife of Emperor Go-Sanjo) including the future Emperor Shirakawa.

The marriage of Emperor Horikawa and Princess Tokushi was Teishi’s idea, to strengthen imperial ties. She organized a poetry contest in 1093. In the same year, she arranged for her granddaughter, Princess Tokushi to become Empress.

Yōmeimon-in.

Issue

- Imperial Prince Takahito (尊仁親王) (Emperor Go-Sanjō) (1034–1073)
- Imperial Princess Nagako/Ryōshi (良子内親王) (1029–1077) - Saiō at Ise Shrine 1036–1045 (Ippon-Jusangū, 一品准三宮)
- Imperial Princess Kenshi (娟子内親王) (1032–1103) - Saiin at Kamo Shrine 1036–1045, and later married to Minamoto no Toshifusa (源俊房)

== Notes ==
Japanese royalty
Preceded by Fujiwara no Ishi	Empress consort of Japan; 1037–1045	Succeeded by Fujiwara no Genshi
Preceded by Fujiwara no Yoshiko (granted title posthumously)	Empress dowager of Japan; 1051–1068	Succeeded by Princess Shōshi
Preceded by Fujiwara no Shōshi	Grand empress dowager of Japan; 1068–1094	Succeeded by Princess Shōshi
