= Fujiwara no Genshi =

Empress consort of Japan
- Tenure: 1037–1039
- Born: August 24, 1016
- Died: September 19, 1039 (aged 23)
- Spouse: Emperor Go-Suzaku (m. 1037)
- Issue: Princess Yūshi; Princess Baishi
- House: Imperial House of Japan
- Father: Prince Atsuyasu

Fujiwara no Genshi (藤原 嫄子; August 24, 1016 – September 19, 1039), born Princess Genshi (嫄子女王), was an empress consort (chūgū) of Emperor Go-Suzaku of Japan. She was the adopted daughter of Fujiwara no Yorimichi, and biological daughter of Imperial Prince Atsuyasu (敦康親王).

== Biography ==
Genshi's father Atsuyasu died in 1018. Her mother was the younger sister of Fujiwara no Yorimichi's official wife, Princess Takahime, and so the daughterless Yorimichi adopted her.

In 1036, she acted as a substitute court lady in the purification ceremony at Emperor Go-Suzaku's first niiname-sai harvest festival. The next year, she entered his court as a court lady, and received the rank of shō shi-i no ge (正四位下). Two months later she was made chūgū, displacing the existing empress consort Princess Teishi to kōgō and souring relations between Teishi and Yorimichi. Favored by the Emperor, Genshi bore him two girls, but died in childbirth at the age of 23 without giving birth to a prince.

According to the records of Ise Shrine (太神宮諸雑事記, daijingū shozō-kiji), when Genshi was bathing ten days after giving birth, there was a great storm. Amidst the lightning and thunder and heavy rain, Genshi died on the spot. At the time, there was a rumor that the Fujiwara family god of Kasuga-taisha was angered that Genshi had been made Empress through adoption into the Fujiwara clan, despite blood ties to the Minamoto clan.

== Issue ==
- Imperial Princess Yūshi/Sukeko (祐子内親王) (1038–1105) – (Sanpon-Jusangū, 三品准三宮)
- Imperial Princess Baishi (禖子内親王) (Rokujō Saiin, 六条斎院) (1039–1096) – Saiin at Kamo Shrine 1046–1058

Japanese royalty
Preceded by Princess Teishi	Empress consort of Japan; 1037–1039	Succeeded by Princess Shōshi
