= Emperor Go-Reizei =

Emperor of Japan from 1045 to 1068

Emperor Go-Reizei; 後冷泉天皇
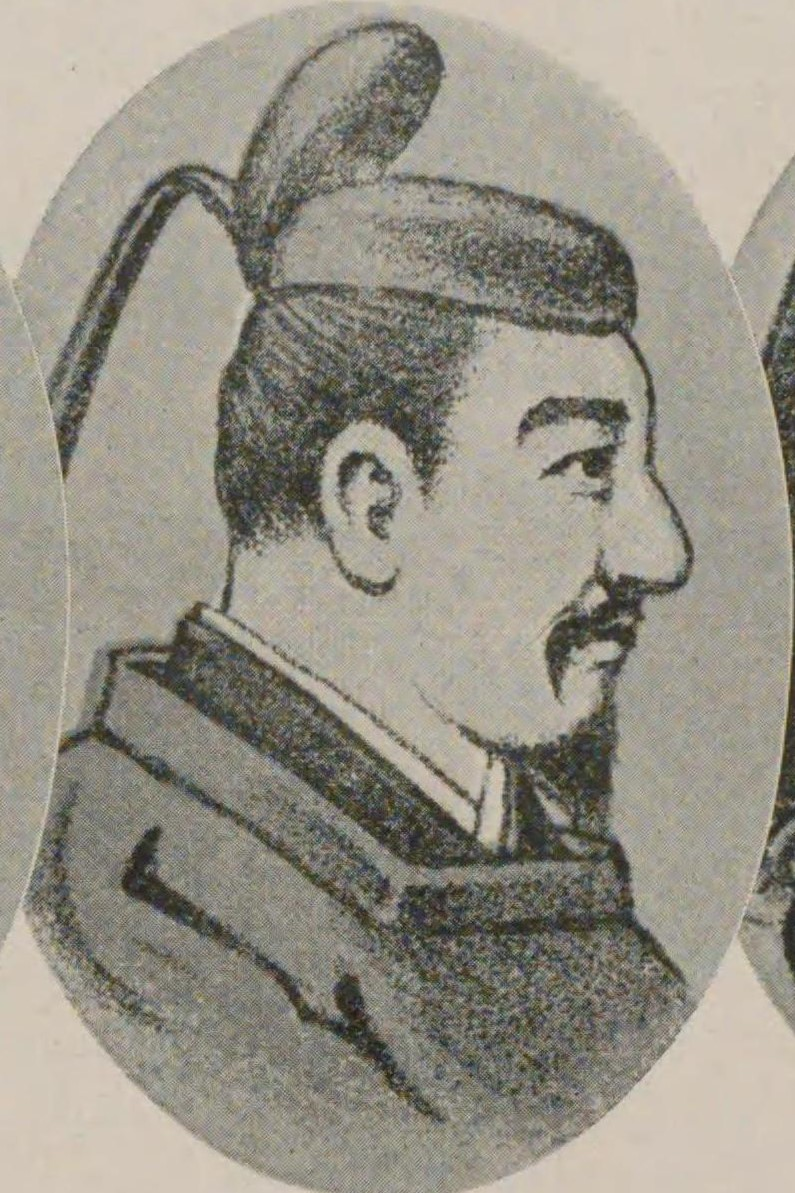

Emperor of Japan
- Reign: February 5, 1045 – May 22, 1068
- Enthronement: April 27, 1045
- Predecessor: Go-Suzaku
- Successor: Go-Sanjō
- Born: August 28, 1025; Heian Kyō (Kyōto)
- Died: May 22, 1068 (aged 42); Kaya no In (高陽院), Heian Kyō (Kyōto)
- Burial: Enkyo-ji no misasagi (円教寺陵) (Kyoto)
- Spouse: Shōshi (m. 1037) Fujiwara no Kanshi (m. 1047) Fujiwara no Hiroko (m. 1050)
Posthumous name
- Tsuigō: Emperor Go-Reizei (後冷泉院 or 後冷泉天皇)
- House: Imperial House of Japan
- Father: Emperor Go-Suzaku
- Mother: Fujiwara no Kishi

Emperor Go-Reizei (後冷泉天皇, Go-Reizei-tennō; August 28, 1025 – May 22, 1068) was the 70th emperor of Japan, according to the traditional order of succession.

Go-Reizei's reign spanned the years 1045–1068.

This 11th century sovereign was named after the 10th century Emperor Reizei and go- (後), translates literally as "later"; and thus, he is sometimes called the "Later Emperor Reizei". The Japanese word "go" has also been translated to mean the "second one"; and in some older sources, this emperor may be identified as "Reizei, the second", or as "Reizei II".

== Biography ==
Before his ascension to the Chrysanthemum Throne, his personal name (imina) was Chikahito-shinnō (親仁親王). He was the eldest son of Emperor Go-Suzaku. His mother was Fujiwara no Kishi (藤原嬉子), formerly Naishi-no kami, daughter of Fujiwara no Michinaga. Go-Reizei had three Empresses and no Imperial sons or daughters.

== Events of Go-Reizei's life ==
Decorative emblems (kiri) of the Hosokawa clan are found at Ryōan-ji. Go-Reizei is amongst six other emperors entombed near what had been the residence of Hosokawa Katsumoto before the Ōnin War.

When Emperor Go-Suzaku abdicated on February 5, 1045, his eldest son received the succession (‘‘senso’’) on the same day. Emperor Go-Reizei formally acceded to the throne (‘‘sokui’’) shortly after, and the era name was changed the following year to mark the beginning of his reign. His father Go-Suzaku died at the age of 37 on February 7, 1045, of unknown causes. The one major event in Go-Reizei's life occurred in the year 1051, when Abe no Sadatō and Munetō instigated a rebellion that became known as the Zenkunen War (1051–1062). In response, Minamoto no Yoriyoshi is appointed governor of Mutsu and he is named chinjufu shōgun. He is given these titles and powers so that he will be able to restore peace in the north. Yoriyoshi would have been the first to receive this specific shogunal title, although his grandfather (Minamoto no Tsunemoto) had been seitō fuku-shōgun (assistant commander for pacification of the east). Go-Reizei later died on May 22, 1068, at the age of 44 leaving no direct heirs to the throne. He was succeeded by his father's second son Takahito-shinnō aka Emperor Go-Sanjō.

The actual site of Go-Reizei's grave is known. This emperor is traditionally venerated at a memorial Shinto shrine (misasagi) though at Kyoto. The Imperial Household Agency designates this location as Go-Reizei's mausoleum. It is formally named Enkyo-ji no misasagi. Go-Reizei is buried amongst the "Seven Imperial Tombs" at Ryōan-ji Temple in Kyoto. The mound which commemorates the Hosokawa Emperor Go-Reizei is today named Shu-zan. The emperor's burial place would have been quite humble in the period after Go-Reizei died. These tombs reached their present state as a result of the 19th century restoration of imperial sepulchers (misasagi) which were ordered by Emperor Meiji.

=== Kugyō ===
Kugyō (公卿) is a collective term for the very few most powerful men attached to the court of the Emperor of Japan in pre-Meiji eras. Even during those years in which the court's actual influence outside the palace walls was minimal, the hierarchic organization persisted.

In general, this elite group included only three to four men at a time. These were hereditary courtiers whose experience and background would have brought them to the pinnacle of a life's career. During Go-Reizei's reign, this apex of the Daijō-kan included:

- Kampaku, Fujiwara Yorimichi, 992–1074.
- Kampaku, Fujiwara Norimichi, 997–1075.
- Daijō-daijin, Fujiwara Yorimichi.
- Sadaijin, Fujiwara Norimichi.
- Sadaijin
- Udaijin, Fujiwara Sanesuke, 957–1046.
- Udaijin, Fujiwara Yorimune, 993–1065.
- Udaijin, Fujiwara Morozane, 1042–1101.
- Nadaijin, Minamoto Morofusa, 1009–1077.
- Dainagon

== Eras of Go-Reizei's reign ==
The years of Go-Reizei's reign are more specifically identified by more than one era name or nengō.

- Kantoku (1044–1046)
- Eishō (1046–1053)
- Tengi (1053–1058)
- Kōhei (1058–1065)
- Jiryaku (1065–1069)

== Empresses and consorts ==
- Empress (Chūgū): Imperial Princess Shōshi (章子内親王, 1027–1105) later Nijō-in (二条院), Emperor Go-Ichijo’s daughter.
- Empress (Kōgō): Fujiwara no Hiroko (藤原寛子; 1036–1127) later Shijō no Miya (四条宮), Fujiwara no Yorimichi‘s daughter
- Empress (Kōgō): Fujiwara no Kanshi (藤原歓子; 1021–1102) later Ono-no-Kōtaigō (小野皇太后), Fujiwara no Norimichi‘s daughter
  - First Son (1049)
- Consort: Sugawara family's daughter
  - Second son: Takashina Tameyuki (高階為行; 1059–1107)

== Ancestry ==
Ancestors of Emperor Go-Reizei

8. Emperor En'yū (959-991)
4. Emperor Ichijō (980-1011)
9. Fujiwara no Senshi (962-1002)
2. Emperor Go-Suzaku (1009-1045)
10. Fujiwara no Michinaga (966-1028)(=6)
5. Empress Shōshi (988-1074)
11.Minamoto no Rinshi (964-1053)(=7)
1. Emperor Go-Reizei
12. Fujiwara no Kaneie (929-990)
6. Fujiwara no Michinaga (966-1028)(=10)
13. Fujiwara no Tokihime (d. 980)
3. Fujiwara no Yoshiko (1007-1025)
14. Minamoto no Masanobu (920-993)
7. Minamoto no Rinshi (964-1053)(=11)
15. Fujiwara no Bokushi (931-1016)

== Notes ==
Japanese Imperial kamon — a stylized chrysanthemum blossom

== See also ==
- Emperor of Japan
- List of Emperors of Japan
- Imperial cult

Regnal titles
Preceded by Emperor Go-Suzaku	Emperor of Japan: Go-Reizei; 1045–1068	Succeeded by Emperor Go-Sanjō
