= Emperor Go-Suzaku =

Emperor of Japan from 1036 to 1045

Emperor Go-Suzaku 後朱雀天皇
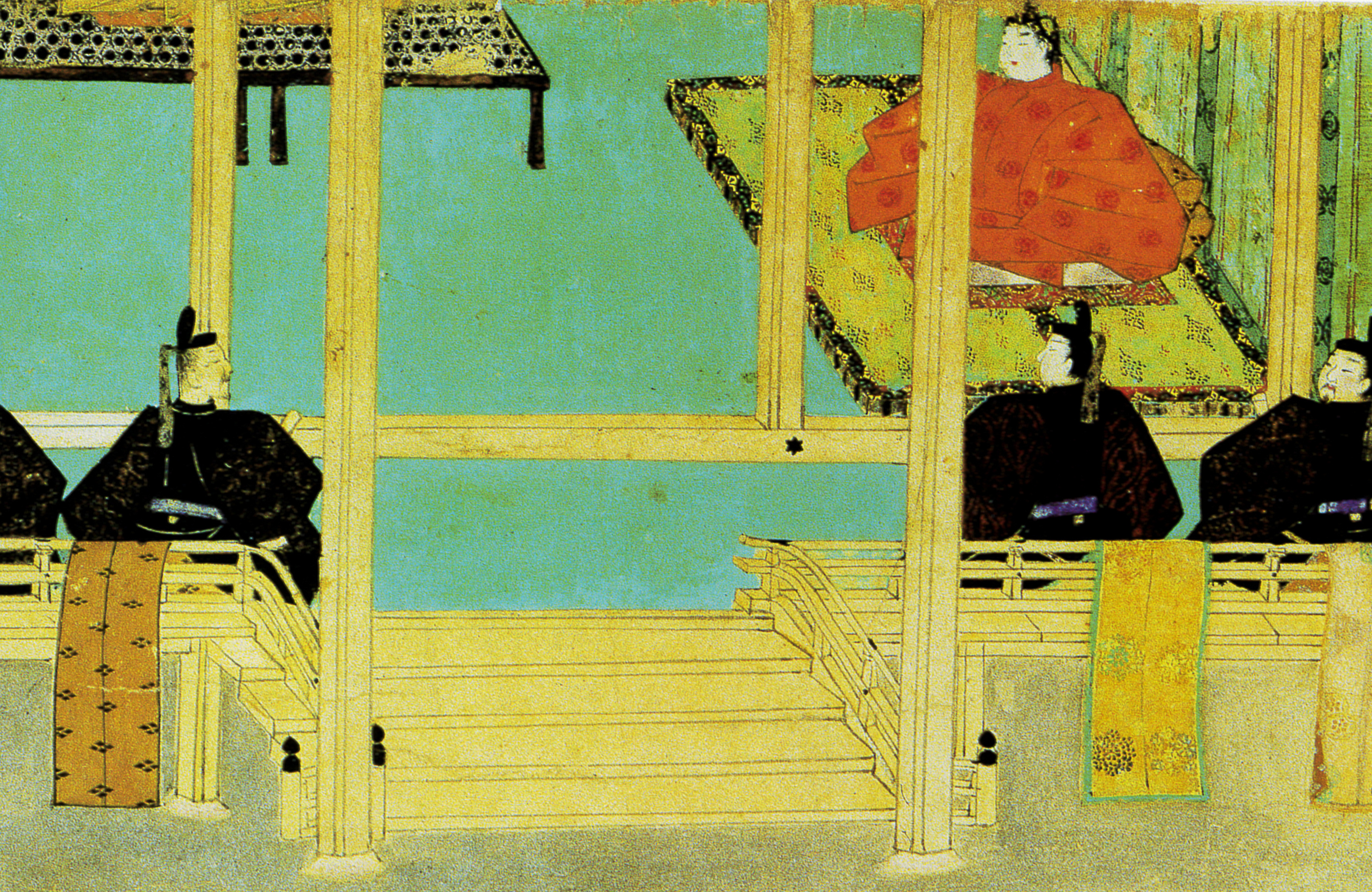
- Emperor Go-Suzaku (in red)

Emperor of Japan
- Reign: May 15, 1036 – February 5, 1045
- Enthronement: August 4, 1036
- Predecessor: Go-Ichijō
- Successor: Go-Reizei
- Born: 14 December 1009; Tsuchimikado Tei (土御門邸), Heian Kyō (Kyōto)
- Died: 7 February 1045 (aged 35); Higashi-sanjō Tei (東三条第), Heian Kyō (Kyōto)
- Burial: Enjō-ji no misasagi (円乗寺陵) (Kyōto)
- Spouse: Teishi (m. 1027) Fujiwara no Genshi (m. 1037; died 1039)
- Issue: Emperor Go-Reizei; Princess Ryōshi; Princess Kenshi; Emperor Go-Sanjō; Princess Yūshi; Princess Baishi; Princess Seishi
Posthumous name
- Tsuigō: Emperor Go-Suzaku (後朱雀院 or 後朱雀天皇)
- House: Imperial House of Japan
- Father: Emperor Ichijō
- Mother: Fujiwara no Shōshi

Emperor Go-Suzaku (後朱雀天皇, Go-Suzaku-tennō; December 14, 1009 – February 7, 1045) was the 69th emperor of Japan, according to the traditional order of succession.

Go-Suzaku's reign spanned the years from 1036 through 1045.

This 11th-century sovereign was named after the 10th-century Emperor Suzaku and go- (後), translates literally as "later;" and thus, he is sometimes called the "Later Emperor Suzaku". The Japanese word "go" has also been translated to mean the "second one;" and in some older sources, this emperor may be identified as "Suzaku, the second" or as "Suzaku II."

== Biography ==
Before his ascension to the Chrysanthemum Throne, his personal name (his imina) was Atsunaga-shinnō (敦良親王).

His father was Emperor Ichijō. His mother was Fujiwara no Akiko/Shōshi (藤原彰子), the daughter of Fujiwara no Michinaga (藤原道長). He was the younger brother and heir to Emperor Go-Ichijō.

Go-Suzaku had five Empresses and seven Imperial children.

== Events of Go-Suzaku's life ==
- May 15, 1036 (Chōgen 9, 17th day of the 4th month) : In the 9th year of Emperor Go-Ichijō's reign (後一条天皇九年), he died; and the succession (‘‘senso’’) was received by his younger brother.
- 1036 (Chōgen 9, 7th month): Emperor Go-Suzaku is said to have acceded to the throne (‘‘sokui’’).
- February 5, 1045 (Kantoku 2, 16th day of the 1st month): Emperor Go-Suzaku abdicated.
- February 7, 1045 (Kantoku 2, 18th day of the 1st month): The former-Emperor Go-Suzaku ordained as a Buddhist monk and died the same day at the age of 37. His reign has lasted nine years—five in the nengō Chōryaku, four in Chōkyu, and 2 in Kantoku.

Decorative emblems (kiri) of the Hosokawa clan are found at Ryōan-ji. Go-Suzaku is amongst six other emperors entombed near what had been the residence of Hosokawa Katsumoto before the Ōnin War.

The actual site of Go-Suzaku's grave is unknown. This emperor is traditionally venerated at a memorial Shinto shrine (misasagi) at Kyoto.

The Imperial Household Agency designates this location as Go-Suzaku's mausoleum. It is formally named Enjō-ji no misasagi.

Go-Suzaku is buried amongst the "Seven Imperial Tombs" at Ryōan-ji Temple in Kyoto.

The specific mound which commemorates the Hosokawa Emperor Go-Suzaku is today named Shu-zan.

The emperor's burial place would have been quite humble in the period after Go-Suzaku died.

These tombs reached their present state as a result of the 19th century restoration of imperial sepulchers (misasagi) which were ordered by Emperor Meiji.

The final resting place of Emperor Go-Suzaku's consort, Teishi Nai-shinnō (1013–1094), is here as well.

=== Kugyō ===
Kugyō (公卿) is a collective term for the very few most powerful men attached to the court of the Emperor of Japan in pre-Meiji eras. Even during those years in which the court's actual influence outside the palace walls was minimal, the hierarchic organization persisted.

In general, this elite group included only three to four men at a time. These were hereditary courtiers whose experience and background would have brought them to the pinnacle of a life's career. During Go-Suzaku's reign, this apex of the Daijō-kan included:

- Sadaijin, Fujiwara Yorimichi, 992–1074.
- Udaijin, Fujiwara Sanesuke, 957–1046.
- Nadaijin, Fujiwara Norimichi, 997–1075.
- Dainagon

== Eras of Go-Suzaku's reign ==
The years of Go-Suzaku's reign are more specifically identified by more than one era name or nengō.

- Chōgen (1028–1037)
- Chōryaku (1037–1040)
- Chōkyū (1040–1044)
- Kantoku (1044–1046)

== Consorts and children ==
- Crown Princess (died before Emperor's accession): Fujiwara no Yoshiko (藤原嬉子; 1007-1025), Fujiwara no Michinaga‘s 6th daughter
  - First Son: Imperial Prince Chikahito (親仁親王) later Emperor Go-Reizei
- Empress (Kōgō): Imperial Princess Teishi (禎子内親王; 1013–1094) later Yōmeimon’in (陽明門院), Emperor Sanjō‘s 3rd daughter
  - First Daughter: Imperial Princess Nagako/Ryōshi (良子内親王, 1029–1077) – Saiō at Ise Shrine 1036–1045 (Ippon-Jusangū, 一品准三宮)
  - Second daughter: Imperial Princess Yoshiko/Kenshi (娟子内親王, 1032–1103) – Saiin at Kamo Shrine 1036–1045, later married Minamoto Toshifusa
  - Second Son: Imperial Prince Takahito (尊仁親王) later Emperor Go-Sanjo
- Empress (Chūgū): Fujiwara no Genshi (藤原嫄子; 1016–1039), Imperial Prince Atsuyasu's daughter and Fujiwara no Yorimichi‘s adopted daughter
  - Third Daughter: Imperial Princess Sukeko/Yūshi (祐子内親王; 1038–1105) – (Sanpon-Jusangū, 三品准三宮)
  - Fourth Daughter: Imperial Princess Miwako/Baishi (禖子内親王; 1039–1096) (Rokujō Saiin, 六条斎院) – Saiin at Kamo Shrine 1046–1058
- Consort (Nyōgo): Fujiwara no Nariko/Seishi (藤原生子; 1014–1068), Fujiwara no Norimichi‘s eldest daughter
- Consort (Nyōgo): Fujiwara no Nobuko/Enshi (藤原延子; 1016–1095), Fujiwara no Yorimune‘s 2nd daughter
  - Fifth Daughter: Imperial Princess Masako/Seishi (正子内親王; 1045–1114) (Oshinokōji-Saiin, 押小路斎院) – Saiin at Kamo Shrine 1058–1069

== Ancestry ==
Ancestors of Emperor Go-Suzaku

8. Emperor Murakami (926-967)
4. Emperor En'yū (959-991)
9. Fujiwara no Anshi (927-964)
2. Emperor Ichijō (980-1011)
10. Fujiwara no Kaneie (929-990) (=12)
5. Fujiwara no Senshi (962-1002)
11. Fujiwara no Tokihime (d. 980) (=13)
1. Emperor Go-Suzaku
12. Fujiwara no Kaneie (929-990) (=10)
6. Fujiwara no Michinaga (966-1028)
13. Fujiwara no Tokihime (d. 980) (=11)
3. Empress Shōshi (988-1074)
14. Minamoto no Masanobu (920-993)
7. Minamoto no Rinshi (964-1053)
15. Fujiwara no Bokushi (931-1016)

== Notes ==
Japanese Imperial kamon — a stylized chrysanthemum blossom

== See also ==
- Emperor of Japan
- List of Emperors of Japan
- Imperial cult

Regnal titles
Preceded by Emperor Go-Ichijō	Emperor of Japan: Go-Suzaku; 1036–1045	Succeeded by Emperor Go-Reizei
