= Fujiwara no Yorimichi =

Japanese court noble

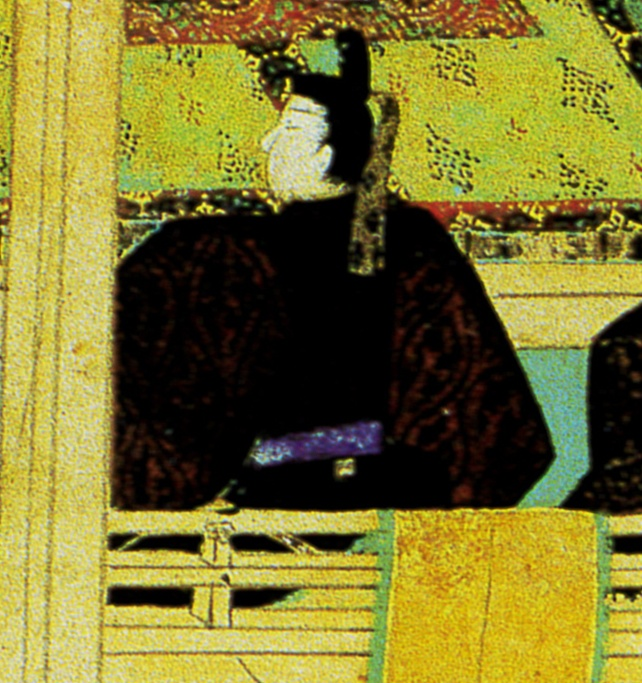
Fujiwara Yorimichi

Fujiwara no Yorimichi (藤原 頼通) (992–1074) was a Japanese court noble. He succeeded his father Michinaga to the position of Sesshō in 1017, and then went on to become Kampaku from 1020 until 1068. In both these positions, he acted as Regent to the Emperor, as many of his ancestors and descendants did; the Fujiwara clan had nearly exclusive control over the regency positions for over 200 years. Prior to succeeding to the position of Regent, Yorimichi had held the title of Naidaijin (Minister of the Center/Palace Minister, second rank range), the lowest level of state ministers. By edict, he was raised above his colleagues, to the title of Ichi no Hito, or First Subject. In addition to the reason of direct succession from his father, this edict was presumably necessary to allow Yorimichi to become Sesshō.

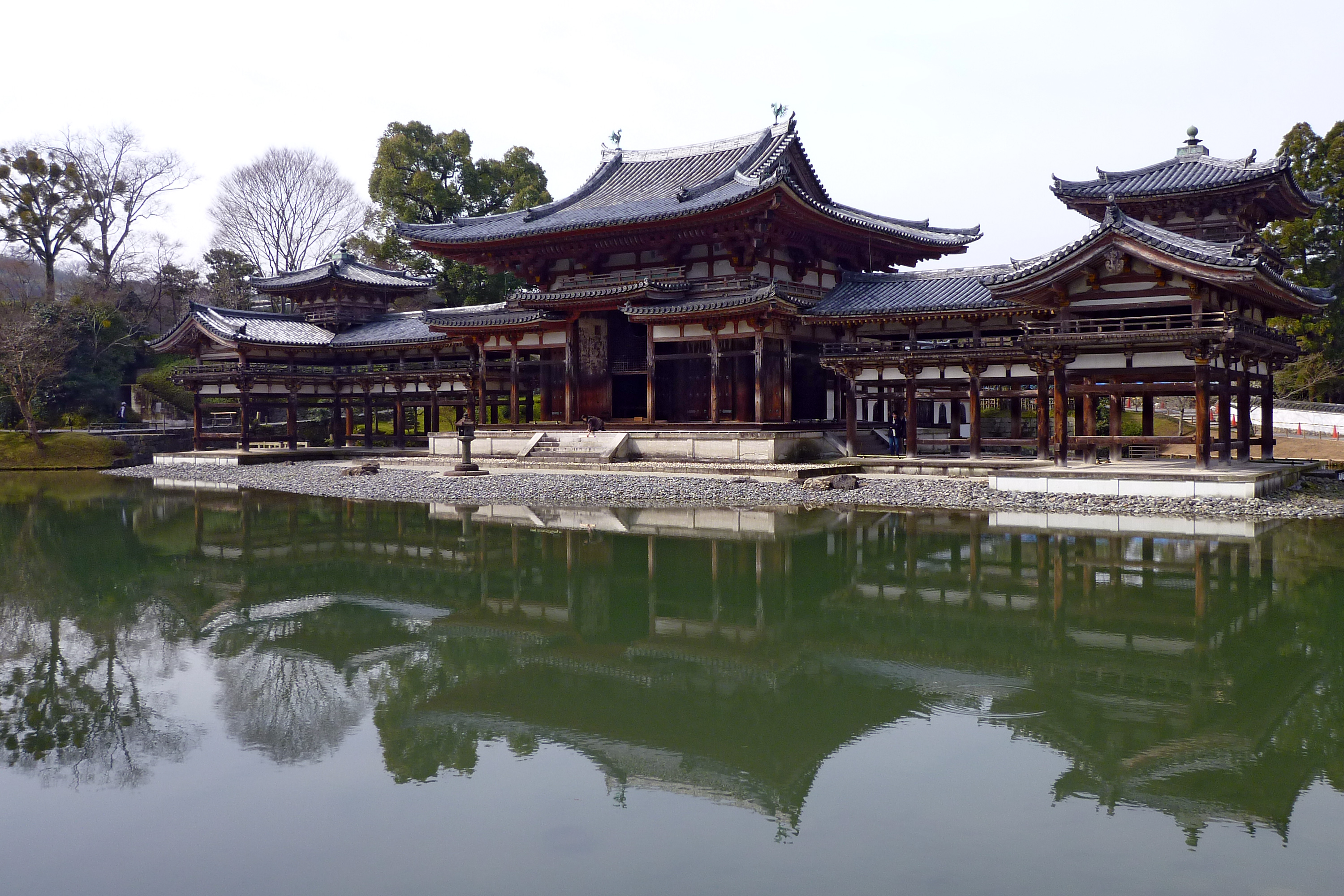
Byodoin phoenix hall

He is also known as the founder of Byōdō-in phoenix hall, located in Uji.

In 1072, he ordained as a Buddhist monk and took the Dharma name Rengekaku (蓮華覚), later changed to Jakukaku (寂覚).

== Marriages and children ==
- Princess Takahime, daughter of Imperial Prince Tomohira (son of Emperor Murakami) and Princess Nakahime; married 1009; no children, but they adopted 2 daughters:
  - Princess Genshi (Motoko), (1016–1039), daughter of Imperial prince Atsuyasu (eldest son of Emperor Ichijō) and Princess Naka no Kimi (Takahime's younger sister); Empress of Emperor Go-Suzaku
  - Fujiwara no Kanshi (Hiroko), (1036–1121), daughter of Yorimichi by Fujiwara no Gishi
- A daughter of Minamoto no Norisada (a grandson of Emperor Murakami):
  - Fujiwara no Michifusa (1024–1044)
- Fujiwara no Gishi (Masako), (died 1053) daughter of Fujiwara no Yorinari (a son of Imperial Prince Tomohira and Princess Nakahime, adopted by Fujiwara no Koresuke) and a daughter of Fujiwara no Korenori; she was then a niece of Princess Takahime:
  - Priest Kakuen (1031–1098)
  - Fujiwara no Kanshi (Hiroko), (1036–1121); adopted by Princess Takahime; Empress of Emperor Go-Reizei
  - Fujiwara no Morozane (1042–1101)
  - Fujiwara no Tadatsuna (died 1084)
