= Emperor Go-Sanjō =

Emperor of Japan from 1068 to 1073

Emperor Go-Sanjō 後三条天皇
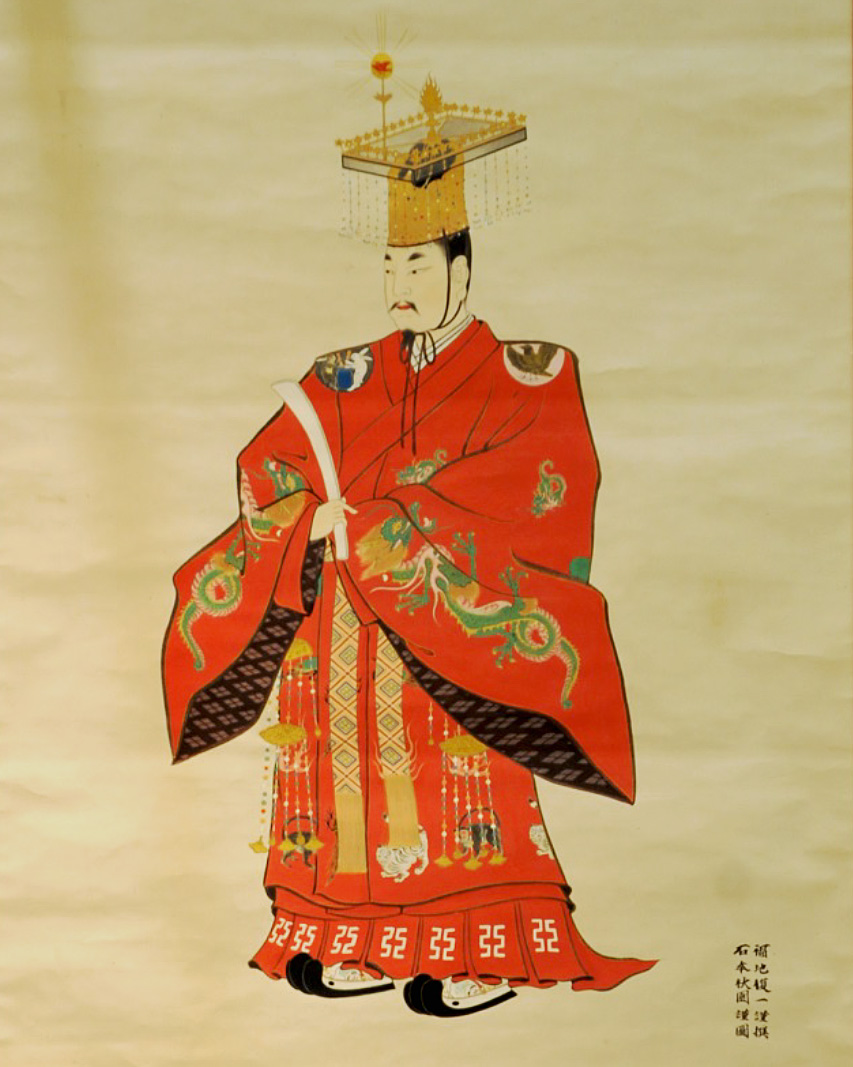
- Emperor Go-Sanjō in Kon'e ceremonial dress

Emperor of Japan
- Reign: May 22, 1068 – January 18, 1073
- Enthronement: August 21, 1068
- Predecessor: Go-Reizei
- Successor: Shirakawa
- Born: Takahito (尊仁、たかひと); September 3, 1034; Heian-kyō (Present: Kyoto, Japan)
- Died: June 15, 1073 (aged 38); Heian-kyō (Present: Kyoto, Japan)
- Burial: Ensō-ji no misasagi (圓宗寺陵) (Kyoto)
- Spouse: Kaoruko (m. 1051)
- Issue: Princess Toshiko; Emperor Shirakawa; Princess Toshiko; Princess Kako; Princess Tokushi; Prince Sanehito; Prince Sukehito
Names
- Takahito (尊仁、たかひと)
Posthumous name
- Tsuigō: Emperor Go-Sanjō (後三条院 or 後三条天皇)
- House: Imperial House of Japan
- Father: Emperor Go-Suzaku
- Mother: Teishi

Emperor Go-Sanjō (後三条天皇, Go-Sanjō-tennō; September 3, 1034 – June 15, 1073) was the 71st emperor of Japan, according to the traditional order of succession. His given name was Takahito (尊仁).

Go-Sanjō's reign spanned the years from 1068 through 1073.

This 11th century sovereign was named after his grandfather Emperor Sanjō and go- (後), translates literally as "later;" and thus, he is sometimes called the "Later Emperor Sanjō", or, in some older sources, may be identified as "Sanjō, the second" or as "Sanjō II."

It was during, and due to, Go-Sanjo's reign that the Fujiwara grip on power was broken; following Go-Sanjo's rule, their power continued to wane until 1150, when any semblance of their power disappeared.

== Biography ==
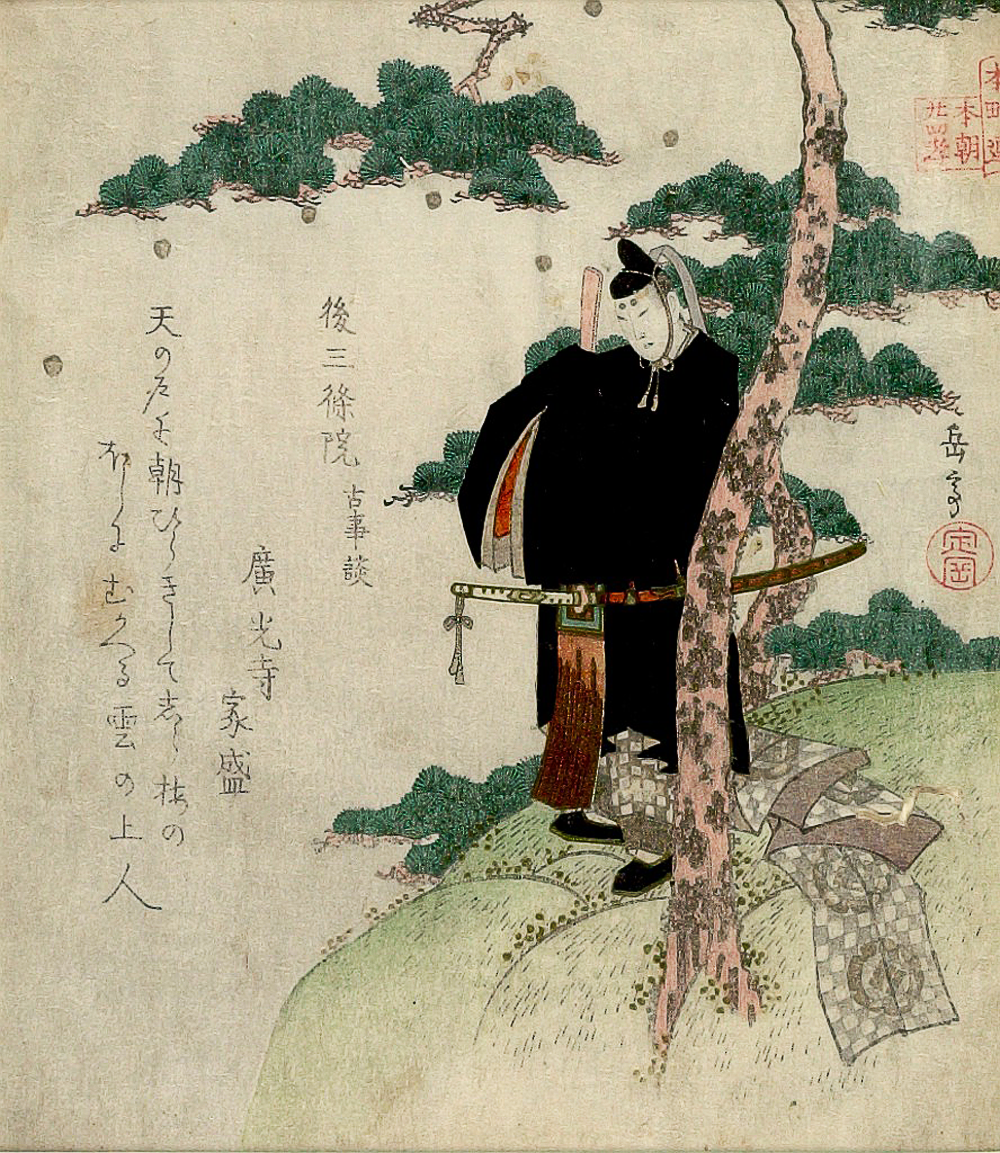
Retired Emperor Go-Sanjo, Ukiyo-e

Before his ascension to the Chrysanthemum Throne, his personal name (諱, imina) was Takahito-shinnō (尊仁親王, たかひとしんのう).

Takahito-shinnō was the second son of Emperor Go-Suzaku. His mother was Empress (kōgō) Sadako (禎子内親王), the third daughter of Emperor Sanjō, making him the first Emperor in 170 years (since Emperor Uda) whose mother was not of Fujiwara descent paternally. His father and mother were grandchildren of Fujiwara no Michinaga maternally. The Empress mother of the future Emperor Go-Sanjō was also known as Teishi, and a Yōmei-mon In (1012–94). His lack of connection with the Fujiwara meant he owed them no special loyalty—meaning that he could afford to oppose them.

== Events of Go-Sanjō's life ==
Because Prince Takahito was not of Fujiwara descent, the Kampaku, Fujiwara no Yorimichi neglected him, but Emperor Go-Suzaku decreed that upon his elder brother Chikahito's enthronement (as Emperor Go-Reizei), that Takahito would become the heir (kōtaitei). As Emperor Go-Reizei had no children of his own, upon his death, Takahito became emperor.

- May 22, 1068 (Jiryaku 4, 19th day of the 4th month): In the 4th year of Emperor Go-Reizei's reign (後冷泉天皇四年), he died at age 44; and the succession (senso) was received by his younger half-brother. Shortly thereafter, Emperor Go-Sanjo is said to have acceded to the throne (sokui).

Yorimichi's younger brother Norimichi became kampaku, but Go-Sanjō was determined to rule personally.

- 1069 (Enkyū 1): Go-Sanjō issued the Enkyū Shōen Regulation Decree (Enkyū is the name of the era in which the decree was issued); and the emperor called for the establishment of a government office to certify Shōen records.
- 1070 (Enkyū 2): Go-Sanjō ordered a preliminary system of laws and a bureaucracy for regulating silk.
- 1072 (Enkyū 4): As the Ritsuryō system of centralized authority had largely failed by this time, Go-Sanjō became interested in strengthening the finances of the Imperial Household.
- January 18, 1073 (Enkyū 4, 8th day of the 12th month): In the 6th year of Emperor Go-Sanjō's reign (桓武天皇六年), the emperor abdicated in favor of his son, and the succession (senso) was received by his son. Shortly thereafter, Emperor Shirakawa is said to have acceded to the throne (sokui).
- May 11, 1073 (Enkyū 5, 21st day of the 4th month): Go-Sanjō entered the Buddhist priesthood; and his new priestly name became Kongō-gyō.
- June 15, 1073 (Enkyū 5, 7th day of the 5th month): The former-Emperor Go-Sanjō died at the age of 40.

Decorative emblems (kiri) of the Hosokawa clan are found at Ryoan-ji. Go-Sanjo is amongst six other emperors entombed near what had been the residence of Hosokawa Katsumoto before the Ōnin War.

Go-Sanjō is buried amongst the "Seven Imperial Tombs" at Ryōan-ji in Kyoto.

The actual site of Go-Sanjō's grave is known. This emperor is traditionally venerated at a memorial Shinto shrine (misasagi) at Kyoto.

The Imperial Household Agency designates this location as Go-Sanjō's mausoleum. It is formally named Yensō-ji no misasagi.

The mound which commemorates the Hosokawa Emperor Go-Sanjō is today named Shu-zan. The emperor's burial place would have been quite humble in the period after Go-Sanjō died.

These tombs reached their present state as a result of the 19th century restoration of imperial sepulchers (misasagi) which were ordered by Emperor Meiji.

=== Kugyō ===
Kugyō (公卿) is a collective term for the very few most powerful men attached to the court of the Emperor of Japan in pre-Meiji eras. Even during those years in which the court's actual influence outside the palace walls was minimal, the hierarchic organization persisted.

In general, this elite group included only three to four men at a time. These were hereditary courtiers whose experience and background would have brought them to the pinnacle of a life's career. During Go-Sanjō's reign, this apex of the Daijō-kan included:

- Kampaku, Fujiwara Norimichi (997–1075).
- Daijō-daijin, Fujiwara Norimichi.
- Sadaijin, Fujiwara Morozone, 1042–1101.
- Udaijin, Minamoto no Morofusa
- Naidaijin
- Dainagon

== Eras of Go-Sanjō's reign ==
The years of Go-Sanjō's reign are more specifically identified by more than one era name or nengō.

- Jiryaku (1065–1069)
- Enkyū (1069–1074)

== Consorts ==
Go-Sanjō had three consorts.

- Empress (Chugū): Imperial Princess Kaoruko (馨子内親王) later Saiin-no Kogo (西院皇后), Emperor Go-Ichijō‘s daughter
- Consort: Fujiwara Shigeko (藤原茂子; d.1062), Fujiwara Kinnari‘s daughter and Fujiwara Yoshinobu‘s adopted daughter
  - First Daughter: Imperial Princess Satoko (聡子内親王; 1050-1131)
  - First son: Imperial Prince Sadahito (貞仁親王) later Emperor Shirakawa
  - Second Daughter: Imperial Princess Toshiko (俊子内親王; 1056-1132)
  - Third Daughter: Imperial Princess Yoshiko (佳子内親王; 1057-1130)
  - Fourth Daughter: Imperial Princess Tokushi (篤子内親王; 1060–1114) married Emperor Horikawa
- Consort: Minamoto Motoko (源基子; 1047-1134), Minamoto Motohira‘s daughter
  - Second son: Imperial Prince Sanehito (実仁親王; 1071-1085), a descendant of the Minamoto clan - Go-Sanjō Genji.
  - Third son: Imperial Prince Sukehito (輔仁親王; 1073-1119), a descendant of the Minamoto clan - Go-Sanjō Genji.
- Consort: Fujiwara Akiko (藤原昭子), Fujiwara Yorimune’s daughter
- Lady-in-waiting: Taira Chikako (平親子), Taira Tsunakuni’s daughter
  - Son: Fujiwara Arisuke (藤原有佐; d.1131), adopted by Fujiwara no Akitsuna

== Ancestry ==
Ancestors of Emperor Go-Sanjō

8. Emperor En'yū (959-991)
4. Emperor Ichijō (980-1011)
9. Fujiwara no Senshi (962-1002)
2. Emperor Go-Suzaku (1009-1045)
10. Fujiwara no Michinaga (966-1028) (=14)
5. Empress Shōshi (988-1074)
11.Minamoto no Rinshi (964-1053) (=15)
1. Emperor Go-Sanjō
12. Emperor Reizei (950-1011)
6. Emperor Sanjō (976-1017)
13. Fujiwara no Chōshi (954-982)
3. Princess Teishi (1013-1094)
14. Fujiwara no Michinaga (966-1028) (=10)
7. Fujiwara no Kenshi (994-1027)
15. Minamoto no Rinshi (964-1053) (=11)

== Notes ==
Japanese Imperial kamon — a stylized chrysanthemum blossom

== See also ==
- Emperor of Japan
- List of Emperors of Japan
- Imperial cult
- Minamoto clan
- Emperor Go-Reizei
- Emperor Shirakawa

Regnal titles
| Preceded by Emperor Go-Reizei | Emperor of Japan: Go-Sanjō; 1068–1073 | Succeeded by Emperor Shirakawa |
