= Dear Radiance =

- Promotional poster
- Written by: Shizuka Ōishi
- Directed by: Yuki Nakajima and others
- Starring: Yuriko Yoshitaka; Tasuku Emoto; Haru Kuroki; Arata Iura; Yō Yoshida; Mitsuki Takahata; Reo Tamaoki; Shohei Miura; Ryo Ryusei; Keita Machida; Daichi Watanabe; Akihisa Shiono; Ai Mikami; First Summer Uika; Katsuya Maiguma; Ryūji Akiyama; Yūsuke Santamaria; Kuranosuke Sasaki; Gorō Kishitani; Yasunori Danta
- Narrated by: Toshie Itō
- Composer: Yumi Tōno
- Country of origin: Japan
- Original language: Japanese
- No. of episodes: 48

Production
- Running time: 45 minutes

Original release
- Network: NHK
- Release: January 7 – December 15, 2024

Dear Radiance (光る君へ, Hikaru Kimi e) is a Japanese historical drama television series starring Yuriko Yoshitaka as Murasaki Shikibu. The series is the 63rd NHK taiga drama.

== Cast ==
=== Starring role ===
- Yuriko Yoshitaka as Murasaki Shikibu. In the series, she is called Mahiro.
  - Miyuko Ochii as young Mahiro

=== Her family ===
- Gorō Kishitani as Fujiwara no Tametoki, Mahiro's father
- Ryōko Kuninaka as Chiyaha, Mahiro's mother
- Mahiro Takasugi as Fujiwara no Nobunori, Mahiro's brother
  - Kōki Yuda as Tarō (young Nobunori)
- Kuranosuke Sasaki as Fujiwara no Nobutaka, Mahiro's husband
- Sara Minami as Fujiwara no Katako (Daini no Sanmi), Mahiro's daughter
- Tarō Yabe as Otomaru
- Seijun Nobukawa as Ito

=== Michinaga's family ===
- Tasuku Emoto as Fujiwara no Michinaga
  - Kousei Kimura as young Michinaga
- Yasunori Danta as Fujiwara no Kaneie, Michinaga's father
- Kotono Mitsuishi as Tokihime, Michinaga's mother
- Arata Iura as Fujiwara no Michitaka, Michinaga's brother
- Yuka Itaya as Takashina no Takako, Michitaka's wife
- Yusuke Kamiji as Fujiwara no Michitsuna, Michinaga's half brother
- Naomi Zaizen as Fujiwara no Yasuko, Michitsuna's mother
- Reo Tamaoki as Fujiwara no Michikane, Michitsuna's brother
- Yō Yoshida as Fujiwara no Akiko (Senshi), Michinaga's sister.
- Mitsuki Takahata as Fujiwara no Sadako, Michitaka's daughter
  - Tampopo Nakamura as young Sadako (around 12 years old)
  - Himari Kimura as young Sadako (around 8 years old)
- Keisuke Watanabe as Fujiwara no Yorimichi, Michinaga's eldest son
- Shohei Miura as Fujiwara no Korechika, Michitaka's eldest son
- Ruka Matsuda as Minamoto no Ikuko, Korechika's wife
- Yume Takeuchi as Fujiwara no Mitsuko
- Ryo Ryusei as Fujiwara no Takaie, Michitaka's second son
- Kumi Takiuchi as Minamoto no Akiko, Michinaga's another wife
- Chikara Honda as Mozuhiko
- Mitsuomi Takahashi as Fujiwara no Yoshichika, Michinaga's cousin
- Ichirōta Miyagawa as Fujiwara no Akimitsu, Michinaga's cousin
- Takayuki Sakoi as Taira no Korenaka
- Anna Kurasawa as Fujiwara no Kiyoko
- Kaisei Kamimura as Fujiwara no Yorimune
- Masaki Himekomatsu as Fujiwara no Norimichi
- Saku Momose as Fujiwara no Akinobu
- Yūtarō Furutachi as Fujiwara no Michitō
- Ryutarou Akimoto as Fujiwara no Yoshinobu
- Nanami Taki as Fujiwara no Yoshiko
- Yūdai Toyoda as Fujiwara no Nagaie

=== Uda Genji ===
- Haru Kuroki as Minamoto no Tomoko, Michinaga's legal wife
- Tōru Masuoka as Minamoto no Masanobu, Tomoko's father
- Mako Ishino as Fujiwara no Mutsuko, Tomoko's 's mother

=== Michinaga's colleagues ===
- Ryūji Akiyama as Fujiwara no Sanesuke
- Keita Machida as Fujiwara no Kintō
- Satoshi Kanada as Fujiwara no Tadanobu
- Daichi Watanabe as Fujiwara no Yukinari
- Daisuke Honda as Minamoto no Toshikata
- Jun Hashizume as Fujiwara no Yoritada
- Masanobu Sakata as Fujiwara no Tamemitsu
- Ryujin Suzuki as Minamoto no Shigenobu
- Yoshihiro Kurita as Fujiwara no Fuminori

=== Emperors and their families ===
- Bandō Minosuke II as Emperor En'yū, the 64th emperor
- Kanata Hongō as Emperor Kazan, the 65th emperor
  - Shunta Itō as Prince Morosada (young Kazan)
- Akihisa Shiono as Emperor Ichijō, the 66th emperor
  - Hinata Hiiragi as young Emperor Ichijō (around 12 years old)
  - Haru Takagi as Prince Yasuhito (young Ichijō, around 10 years old)
- Kataoka Sennosuke as Prince Atsuyasu
  - Kai Watanabe as young Atsuyasu
- Tatsunari Kimura as Emperor Sanjō, the 67th emperor
- Sakura Inoue as Fujiwara no Yoshiko
- Shizuka Nakamura as Fujiwara no Nobuko
- Seia Yasuda as Fujiwara no Motoko
- Aki Asakura as Fujiwara no Sukeko
- Tatsumi Asa as Prince Atsuakira
- Hinako Tanaka as Queen Takahime
- Yukino Kaizu as Princess Nagako
- Hinata Takano as Emperor Go-Ichijō, the 68th emperor
  - Ise Hashimoto as Prince Atsuhira (young Go-Ichijō, around 12 years old)
  - Ren Ishizuka as Prince Atsuhira (young Go-Ichijō, around 8 years old)
  - Aoi Hamada as Prince Atsuhira (young Go-Ichijō, around 5 years old)

=== Empress Akiko and the women who serve her ===
- Ai Mikami as Empress Akiko (Shōshi), Michinaga's daughter and Emperor Ichijō's wife
- Rika Izumi as Izumi Shikibu
- Kinako Kobayashi as Miya no Senji
- Rena Mashita as Dainagon no Kimi
- Kaori Seto as Saishō no Kimi
- Natsu Fukui as Koshōshō no Kimi
- Rio Kanno as Saemon no Naishi
- Ui as Uma-no-Chūjō no Kimi

=== Song dynasty ===
- Haogo (Koji Yano) as Zhu Rencong
- Kouhei Matsushita as Zhou Ming

=== Others ===
- First Summer Uika as Sei Shōnagon. In the series, she is called Kikyō.
- Hiroshi Ōmori as Kiyohara no Motosuke, Kikyō's father
- Kaname Ouki as Akazome Emon
- Yūsuke Santamaria as Abe no Haruakira, a.k.a. Abe no Seimei
- Daiki as Sumaru
- Katsuya Maiguma as Naohide
- Masumi Nomura as Sawa
- San'yūtei Koyūza as Eshi, a painter
- Kayo Noro as Nui
- Kanro Morita as Minamoto no Kunimori
- Atsumi Tanezaki as cockatoo voice
- Takamasa Tamaki as Minamoto no Mitsumasa
- Yu Tokui as Ōno Kunikatsu
- Junpei Yasui as Mikuni no Wakamaro
- Takenori Kaneko as Hayanari
- Kento Ogura as Tsunekata
- Kentarō Itō as Sōjumaru
- Miyu Yagyu as Toshiko, Kintō's wife
- Shoichiro Akaboshi as Jōchō
- Ryuhei Watabe as Kyōri
- Ozuno Nakamura as Taira no Muneyori
- Masashi Taniguchi as Ōe no Masahira
- Chinami Nishimura (Note: Cameo appearance due to collaboration project with the anime Ojarumaru.) as a Myōbu
- Nao Kosaka as Saiin no Chūjō
- Yū Kamio as Taira no Tamekata
- Sakura Kiryu as Sugawara no Takasue's daughter
- Aina Yamada as Fujiwara no Nobuko
- Masayuki Deai as Fujiwara no Tomochika
- Kenji Matsuda as Fujiwara no Suketaka
- Shinji Asakura as Ōkura no Taneki
- Kenta Uchino as Taira no Muneyuki
- Kunihiro Suda as Takarabe no Hironobu
- Norihito Kaneko as Ōga no Morimiya
- Biyori Moriya as Fun'ya no Tadamitsu
- Tyson Ohya as Jōkaku
- Shohei Ueki as Minamoto no Michikata

== TV schedule ==
Episode	Title	Directed by	Original airdate	Rating
1	"Yakusoku no Tsuki" (約束の月)	Yuki Nakajima	January 7, 2024	12.7%
2	"Meguriai" (めぐりあい)	Yuki Nakajima	January 14, 2024	12.0%
3	"Nazo no Otoko" (謎の男)	Yuki Nakajima	January 21, 2024	12.4%
4	"Gosechi no Maihime" (五節の舞姫)	Yoshiharu Sasaki	January 28, 2024	11.3%
5	"Kokuhaku" (告白)	Satoru Nakaizumi	February 4, 2024	11.7%
6	"Futari no Saijo" (二人の才女)	Rintarō Mayuzumi	February 11, 2024	11.0%
7	"Okashiki Kotokoso" (おかしきことこそ)	Yuki Nakajima	February 18, 2024	10.9%
8	"Manekarezaru Mono" (招かれざる者)	Yoshiharu Sasaki	February 25, 2024	10.8%
9	"Tōku no Kuni" (遠くの国)	Satoru Nakaizumi	March 3, 2024	11.2%
10	"Tsukiyo no Inbō" (月夜の陰謀)	Rintarō Mayuzumi	March 10, 2024	10.3%
11	"Madou Kokoro" (まどう心)	Yuki Nakajima	March 17, 2024	11.4%
12	"Omoi no Hate" (思いの果て)	Yoshiharu Sasaki	March 24, 2024	10.6%
13	"Susumubeki Michi" (進むべき道)	Satoru Nakaizumi	March 31, 2024	10.9%
14	"Hoshi Ochite Nao" (星落ちてなお)	Rintarō Mayuzumi	April 7, 2024	10.8%
15	"Ogoreru Mono-tachi" (おごれる者たち)	Yuki Nakajima	April 14, 2024	10.7%
16	"Hana no Kage" (華の影)	Eisuke Hara	April 21, 2024	10.5%
17	"Utsuroi" (うつろい)	Yoshiharu Sasaki	April 28, 2024	10.1%
18	"Kiro" (岐路)	Satoru Nakaizumi	May 5, 2024	9.4%
19	"Hanatareta Ya" (放たれた矢)	Rintarō Mayuzumi	May 12, 2024	10.8%
20	"Nozomi no Saki ni" (望みの先に)	Yuki Nakajima	May 19, 2024	11.2%
21	"Tabidachi" (旅立ち)	Eisuke Hara	May 26, 2024	10.7%
22	"Echizen no Deai" (越前の出会い)	Yoshiharu Sasaki	June 2, 2024	10.7%
23	"Yuki no Mau Koro" (雪の舞うころ)	Satoru Nakaizumi	June 9, 2024	11.4%
24	"Wasure'enu Hito" (忘れえぬ人)	Yūki Sahara	June 16, 2024	10.7%
25	"Ketsui" (決意)	Yuki Nakajima	June 23, 2024	10.1%
26	"Ikenie no Hime" (いけにえの姫)	Rintarō Mayuzumi	June 30, 2024	10.9%
27	"Shukuen no Inochi" (宿縁の命)	Yoshiharu Sasaki	July 14, 2024	11.0%
28	"Ittei-Nikō" (一帝二后)	Satoru Nakaizumi	July 21, 2024	11.1%
29	"Haha toshite" (母として)	Yūki Sahara	July 28, 2024	10.0%
30	"Tsunagaru Kotonoha" (つながる言の葉)	Yuki Nakajima	August 4, 2024	10.3%
31	"Tsuki no Shita de" (月の下で)	Yuki Nakajima	August 18, 2024	10.3%
32	"Tagatame ni Kaku" (誰がために書く)	Rintarō Mayuzumi	August 25, 2024	11.2%
33	"Shikibu Tanjō" (式部誕生)	Yoshiharu Sasaki	September 1, 2024	10.4%
34	"Mezame" (目覚め)	Hitoshi Matsumoto	September 8, 2024	11.2%
35	"Chūgū no Namida" (中宮の涙)	Satoru Nakaizumi	September 15, 2024	10.3%
36	"Machinozomareta Hi" (待ち望まれた日)	Yōji Tanaka	September 22, 2024	10.5%
37	"Hamon" (波紋)	Yuki Nakajima	September 29, 2024	10.7%
38	"Mabushiki Yami" (まぶしき闇)	Rintarō Mayuzumi	October 6, 2024	11.2%
39	"Todaenu Kizuna" (とだえぬ絆)	Yoshiharu Sasaki	October 13, 2024	10.2%
40	"Kimi o Okite" (君を置きて)	Hitoshi Matsumoto	October 20, 2024	9.8%
41	"Yuragi" (揺らぎ)	Yōji Tanaka	October 27, 2024	9.5%
42	"Kawabe no Chikai" (川辺の誓い)	Yuki Nakajima	November 3, 2024	9.1%
43	"Kagayaki no Nochi ni" (輝きののちに)	Akihiro Watanabe	November 10, 2024	10.3%
44	"Mochizuki no Yoru" (望月の夜)	Rintarō Mayuzumi	November 17, 2024	10.2%
45	"Habataki" (はばたき)	Yoshiharu Sasaki	November 24, 2024	10.1%
46	"Toi no Nyūkō" (刀伊の入寇)	Yuki Nakajima	December 1, 2024	9.7%
47	"Kanashiku tomo" (哀しくとも)	Yōji Tanaka	December 8, 2024	10.0%
48	"Monogatari no Saki ni" (物語の先に)	Yuki Nakajima	December 15, 2024	11.0%
Average rating 10.7% - Rating is based on Japanese Video Research (Kantō region).

=== Omnibus ===
Episode	Title	Original airdate	Original airtime
1	"Ichi no Maki" (一の巻, Part 1)	December 29, 2024	12:05 - 13:00
2	"Ni no Maki" (二の巻, Part 2)	December 29, 2024	13:05 - 13:48
3	"San no Maki" (三の巻, Part 3)	December 29, 2024	13:48 - 14:31
4	"Yon no Maki" (四の巻, Part 4)	December 29, 2024	14:31 - 15:15
5	"Go no Maki" (五の巻, Part 5)	December 29, 2024	15:20 - 16:03
