= The Diary of Lady Murasaki =

Early 11th C. Japanese written work

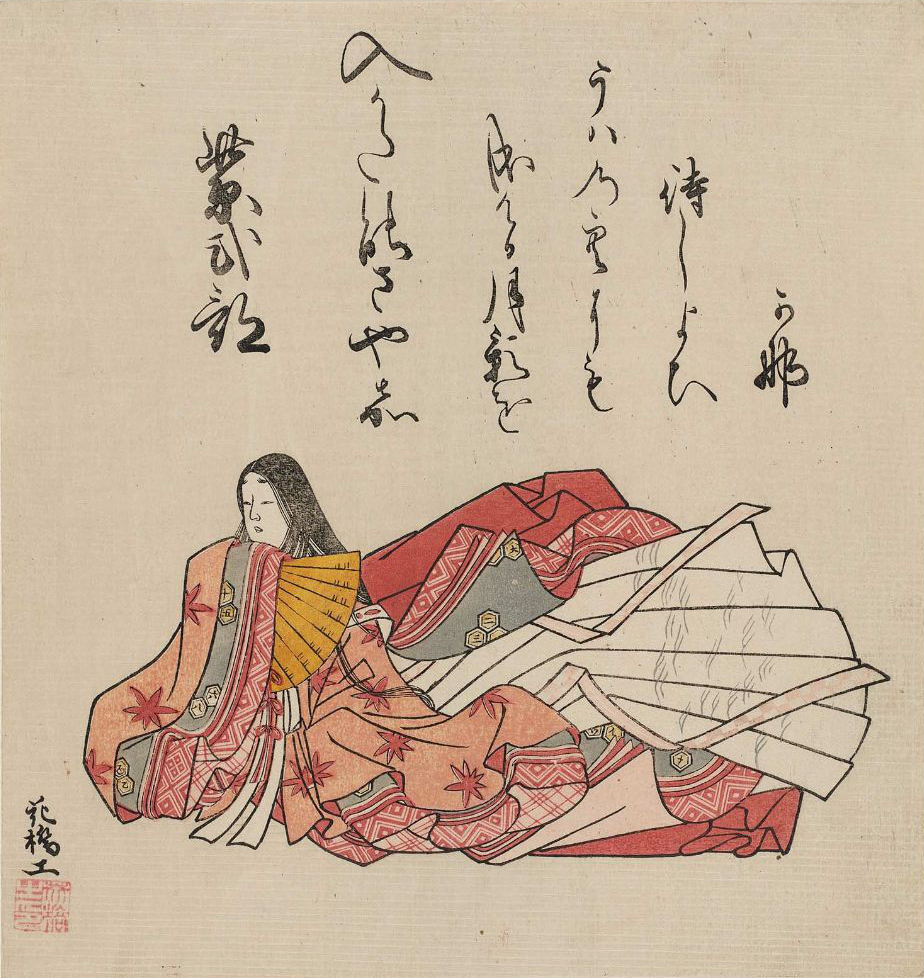
Murasaki Shikibu wrote her diary at the Heian imperial court between c. 1008 – c. 1010. She is depicted here in a c. 1765 nishiki-e by Komatsuken.

The Diary of Lady Murasaki (紫式部日記, Murasaki Shikibu Nikki) is the title given to a collection of diary fragments written by the 11th-century Japanese Heian era lady-in-waiting and writer Murasaki Shikibu. It is written in kana, then a newly-developed writing system for vernacular Japanese, more common among women, who were generally unschooled in Chinese. Unlike modern diaries or journals, 10th-century Heian diaries tend to emphasize important events more than ordinary day-to-day life and do not follow a strict chronological order. The work includes vignettes, waka poems, and an epistolary section written in the form of a long letter.

The diary was probably written between 1008 and 1010 when Murasaki was in service at the imperial court. The largest portion details the birth of Empress Shōshi's (Akiko) children. Shorter vignettes describe interactions among imperial ladies-in-waiting and other court writers, such as Izumi Shikibu, Akazome Emon and Sei Shōnagon. Murasaki includes her observations and opinions throughout, bringing to the work a sense of life at the early 11th century Heian court, lacking in other literature or chronicles of the era.

A Japanese picture scroll, the Murasaki Shikibu Nikki Emaki, was produced during the Kamakura period (1185–1333), and the fragments of the diary serve as the basis for three important translations to English in the 20th century.

== Background ==
At the peak of the Heian period, from the late 10th to early 11th century, as Japan sought to establish a unique national culture of its own it saw the genesis of early Japanese classical literature, which to a large part emerged from women's court literature. Through the rise and use of kana, aristocratic women court writers formed a foundation for classical court literature, according to Haruo Shirane. Kokin Wakashū's first imperial waka collection, published c. 905, set the foundation for court literature. Up to this point, Japanese literature was written in Chinese – traditionally the language of men in the public sphere. It was in the literature of the imperial court that the gradual shift toward the vernacular kana writing system was most evident, and where waka poetry became immensely popular. As Shirane explains: "Waka became integral to the everyday life of the aristocracy, functioning as a form of elevated dialogue and the primary means of communication between the sexes, who usually were physically segregated from each other."

By the early 11th century new genres of women's court literature were appearing in the form of diaries and poetic stories. Women, relegated to the private sphere, quickly embraced the use of kana, unlike men who still conducted business in Chinese. Women's writing showed a marked difference from men's, more personal and introspective in nature. Thus written Japanese was developed by women who used the language as a form of self-expression and, as Japanese literature scholar Richard Bowring says, by women who undertook the process of building "a flexible written style out of a language that had only previously existed in a spoken form".

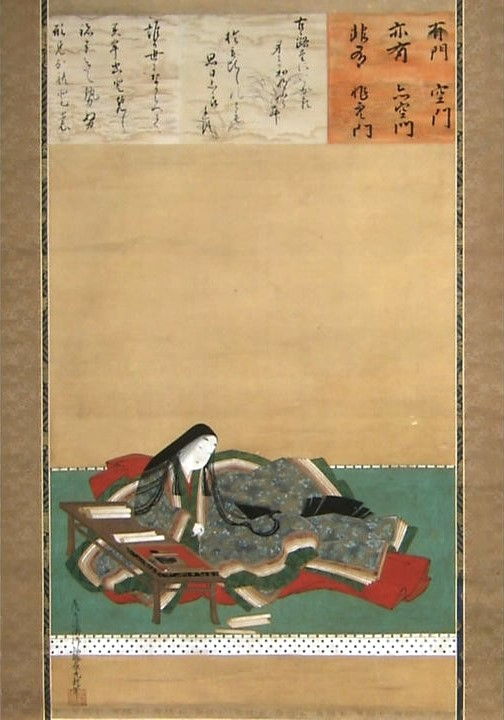
Murasaki Shikibu, depicted by Tosa Mitsuoki, from his illustrations of The Tale of Genji (17th century)

Emperor Ichijō's court, dominated by the powerful Fujiwara clan, was the seat of two rival imperial empresses, Teishi and Shōshi, each with ladies-in-waiting who were proficient writers producing works honoring their mistresses and the Fujiwara clan. The three most noteworthy Heian-era diaries in the genre of Nikki Bungaku – Murasaki's The Diary of Lady Murasaki, Sei Shōnagon's The Pillow Book and Izumi Shikibu's Izumi Shikibu Nikki – came from the empresses' courts. Murasaki's diary covers a discrete period, most likely from 1008 to 1010. Only short and fragmentary pieces of the diary survive and its importance lies, in part, in the revelations about the author, about whom most of the known biographical facts come from it and from her c. 1014 short poetry collection, the Murasaki Shikibu shū (or Poetic Memoirs).

Murasaki's given name is unknown. Women were often identified by their rank or that of a husband or another close male relative. "Murasaki" was given to her at court, from a character in The Tale of Genji; "Shikibu" denotes her father's rank at the Ministry of Ceremonial Affairs (Shikibu-shō). A member of a minor branch of the Fujiwara clan, her father was a scholar of Chinese literature who educated both his children in classical Chinese, although educating a female child was exceedingly uncommon.

Around 998 Murasaki married Fujiwara no Nobutaka (1001); she gave birth to a daughter in 999. Two years later her husband died. Scholars are unsure when she started writing the novel (monogatari) The Tale of Genji, but she was certainly writing after she was widowed, perhaps in a state of grief. In her diary she describes her feelings after her husband's death: "I felt depressed and confused. For some years I had existed from day to day in listless fashion [...] doing little more than registering the passage of time [...] The thought of my continuing loneliness was quite unbearable". On the strength of her reputation as an author, Murasaki entered service with Shōshi at court, almost certainly at the request of Shōshi's father, Fujiwara no Michinaga, perhaps as an incentive to continue adding chapters to The Tale of Genji. She began writing her diary after entering imperial service.

== Diary ==
The diary consists of a number of vignettes containing lengthy description of Shōshi's (known as Akiko)'s eldest son Prince Atsuhira's birth, and an epistolary section. Set at the imperial court in Kyoto, it opens with these words: "As autumn advances, the Tsuchimikado mansion looks unutterably beautiful. Every branch on every tree by the lake and each tuft of grass on the banks of the stream takes on its own particular color, which is then intensified by the evening light."

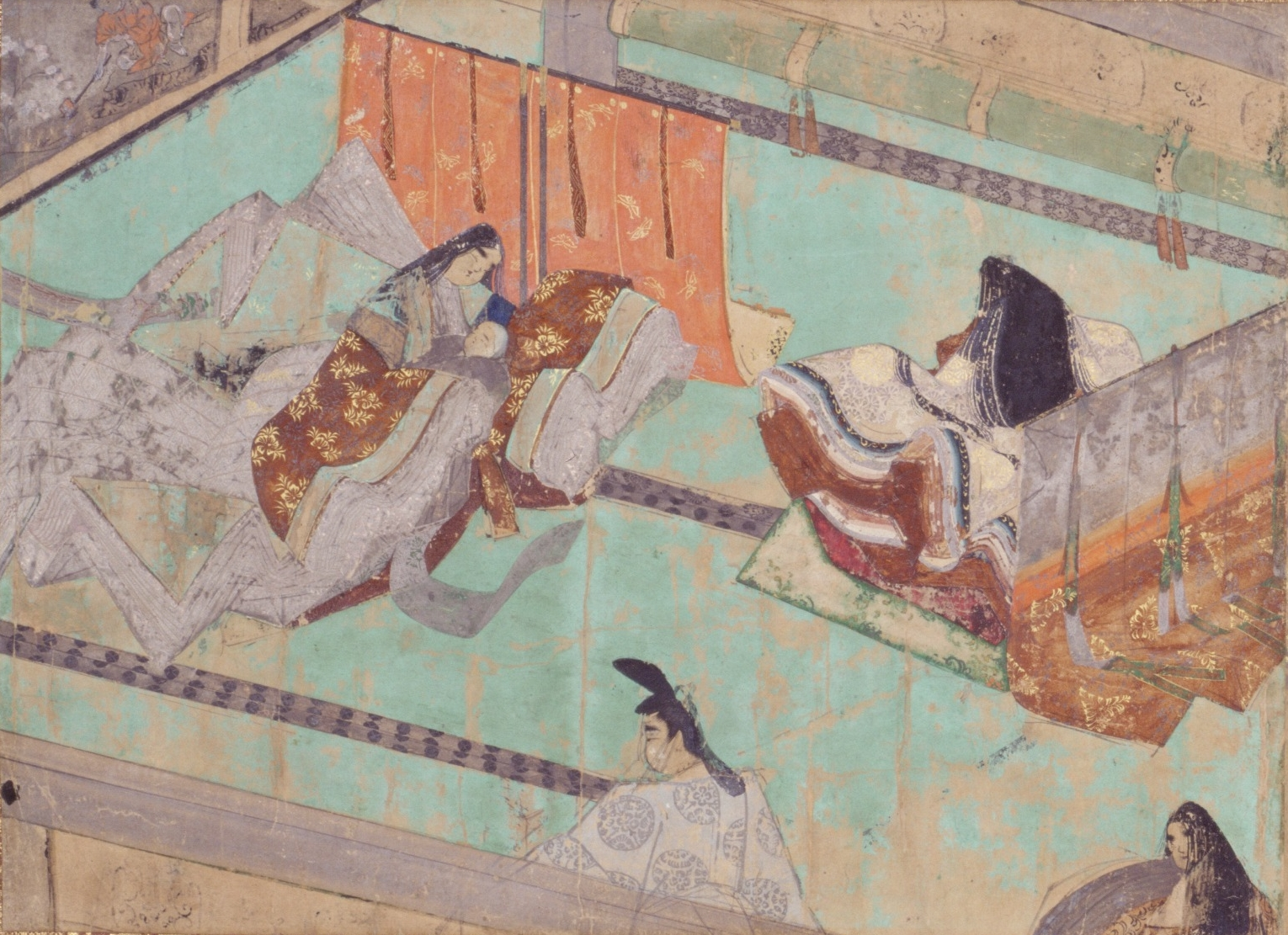
The 50th day celebration of the birth of Prince Atsuhira-shinnō (later Emperor Go-Ichijō). Fujiwara no Michinaga is in the foreground offering mochi. The figure to his right might be Murasaki Shikibu, c. 13th century.

The opening vignettes are followed by short accounts of the events surrounding Shōshi's pregnancy. She begins with a description of the Empress's removal from the Imperial palace to her father's house, the various celebrations and rituals that took place during the pregnancy, and the eventual childbirth with its associated rites in celebration of the successful delivery of a male heir. These passages include specific readings of sutras and other Buddhist rituals associated with childbirth.

Several passages account Murasaki's dissatisfaction with court life. She describes feelings of helplessness, her sense of inadequacy compared to higher-ranked Fujiwara clan relatives and courtiers, and the pervasive loneliness after her husband's death. In doing so, she adds a sense of self to the diary entries.

The diary includes autobiographical snippets about Murasaki's life before she entered imperial service, such as a childhood anecdote about how she learned Chinese:

When my brother Nobunori [...] was a young boy learning the Chinese classics, I was in the habit of listening with him and I became unusually proficient at understanding those passages that he found too difficult to grasp and memorize. Father, a most learned man, was always regretting the fact: 'Just my luck!' he would say. 'What a pity she was not born a man!'

Some textual fragments may not have survived. Bowring believes the work is difficult to define, that piecing it together is puzzling. He sees four discrete sections, beginning with the dated descriptions of the birth, followed by two undated sections of introspective vignettes, and a final dated section in chronological order. This "strange arrangement", as he calls it, might be the result of stitching together a series of incomplete sources or fragments. The diary's text was used as a source for the Eiga Monogatari – a laudatory work about Michinaga and the Fujiwara clan, written or compiled in the 11th century – with entire sections copied verbatim from Murasaki's work. Yet the textual differences between the two suggests the Eiga Monogatari author had access to a different, perhaps more complete text of the diary than has survived. Bowring questions whether the current structure is original to Murasaki, and the degree to which it has been rearranged or rewritten since she authored it.

=== Fujiwara dynasty ===
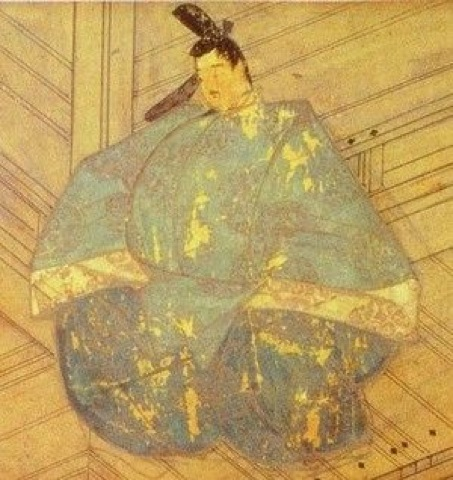
Fujiwara no Michinaga, shown here in a 13th-century illustration of the diary.

Unlike the imaginary courts of Murasaki's romantic novel The Tale of Genji, the descriptions in the diary of imperial court life are starkly realistic. The ideal "shining prince" Genji of her novel contrasts sharply with Michinaga and his crass nature; he embarrasses his wife and daughter with his drunken behavior, and his flirtations toward Murasaki make her uncomfortable. She writes about waking in the morning to find him lurking in the garden outside her window, and the ensuing exchange of waka:

Dew is still on the ground but His Excellency is already out in the garden [...] he peers in over the top of the curtain frame [...] [and] makes me conscious of my own disheveled appearance, and so when he presses me for a poem I use it as an excuse to move to where my inkstone is kept.

Whether the two were intimate is a question scholars have been unable to determine.

Although the diary's sections about the birth of Shōshi's son were meant as a tribute to Michinaga, he is revealed as overly controlling. The child's birth was of enormous importance to Michinaga, who nine years earlier brought his daughter to court as a concubine to Emperor Ichijō; Shōshi's quick ascendence to Empress and status as a mother to the heir consolidated her father's power. The child's birth and its lengthy descriptions, "marked the final tightening of Michinaga's velvet-gloved strangle-hold on imperial succession through his masterful manipulation of marriage politics."

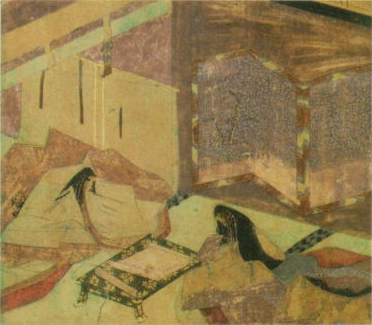
Empress Shōshi and Murasaki reading Bai Juyi's poems in Chinese. From the Murasaki Shikibu Nikki Emaki, 13th century.

Michinaga dominated the child's father and attending priests throughout the birth ceremonies. After the birth, he visited twice daily, whereas the Emperor only made a single short imperial visit to his son. Murasaki chronicles each of Michinaga's ceremonial visits, as well as the lavish ceremony held 16 days after the birth. These include intricate descriptions of the ladies and their court attire:

Saemon no Naishi [...] was wearing a plain yellow-green jacket, a train shading at the hem, and a sash and waistbands with raised embroidery in orange and white checked silk. Her mantle had five cuffs of white lined with dark red, and her crimson gown was of beaten silk.

Shōshi appears to have been serious and studious, a royal who expected decorum from her ladies-in-waiting – which often created difficulties at a fractious court. When she asked Murasaki for lessons in Chinese, she insisted they be conducted in secret. Murasaki explained that "because [Shōshi] evinced a desire to know more about such things, to keep it secret we carefully chose times when the other women would not be present, and, from the summer before last, I started giving her informal lessons on the two volumes of 'New Ballads'. I hid this fact from others, as did Her Majesty".

=== Court life ===
Some of the diary's passages are unflinching in exposing the behavior at the imperial court, particularly that of drunken courtiers who seduced the ladies-in-waiting. As Keene describes it, the court was a place where the courtiers were "drunken men who make obscene jokes and paw at women". Murasaki complained about drunk courtiers and princes who behaved badly, such as the incident when at a banquet court poet Fujiwara no Kintō joined a group of women asking whether Murasaki was present – alluding to the character in The Tale of Genji. Murasaki retorted that none of the novel's characters lived at this tawdry and unpleasant court, so unlike the court in her novel. She left the banquet when "Counsellor Takai [...] started pulling at Lady Hyōbu's robes and singing dreadful songs, but His Excellency said nothing. I realized that it was bound to be a terribly drunken affair this evening, so [...] Lady Saishō and I decided to retire."

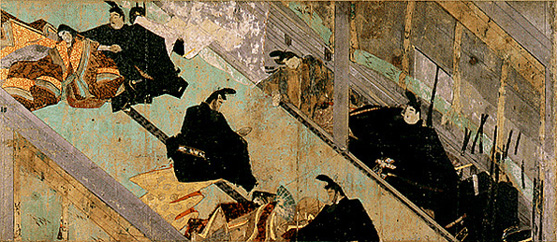
Drunk, disarranged, and disordered Heian courtiers seen here joking and flirting with ladies-in-waiting. Handscroll (emakimono), color on paper. Fujita Art Museum, Osaka, Japan.

There are anecdotes about drunken revelries and courtly scandals concerning women who, because of behavior or age, were forced to leave imperial service. Murasaki suggests that the court women were weak-willed, uneducated, and inexperienced with men.

The women lived in semi-seclusion in curtained areas or screened spaces without privacy. Men were allowed to enter the women's space at any time. When the Imperial palace burned down in 1005 the court was itinerant for the following years, depending on Michinaga for housing. Murasaki lived at his Biwa mansion, the Tsuchimikado mansion, or Emperor Ichijō's mansion, where there was little space. Ladies-in-waiting had to sleep on thin futons rolled out on bare wood floors in a room often created by curtaining off a space. The dwellings were slightly raised and opened to the Japanese garden, affording little privacy. Bowring explains how vulnerable the women were to men watching them: "A man standing outside in the garden looking in [...] his eyes would have been roughly level with the skirts of the woman inside."

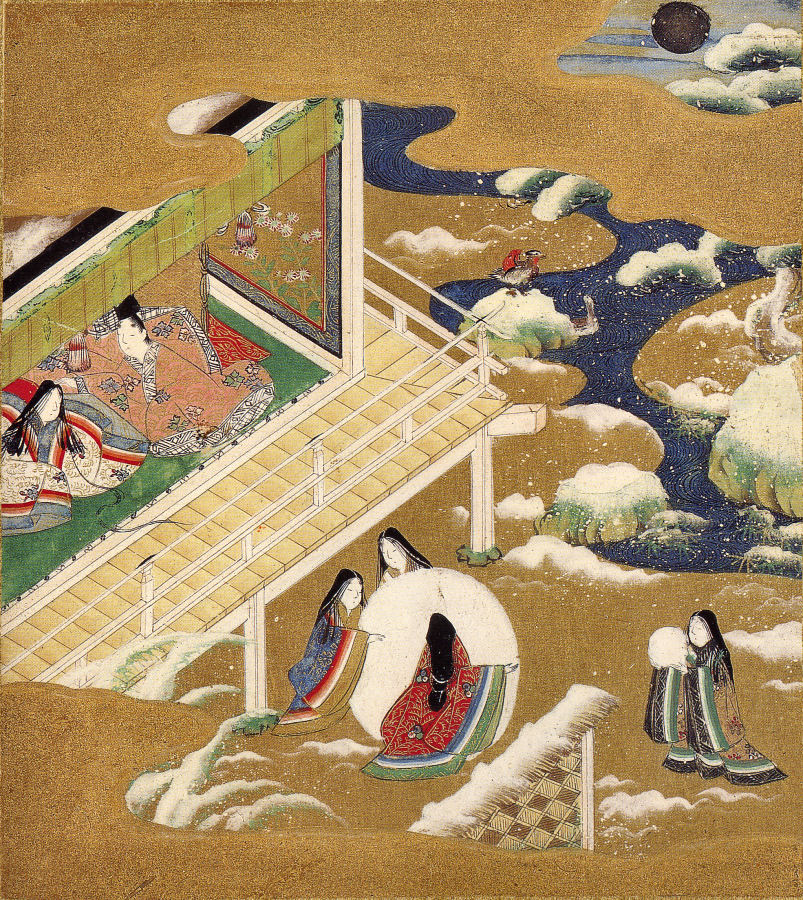
Heian-era imperial ladies-in-waiting in the garden beneath a woman's chamber. (Tosa Mitsuoki, c. late 17th century)

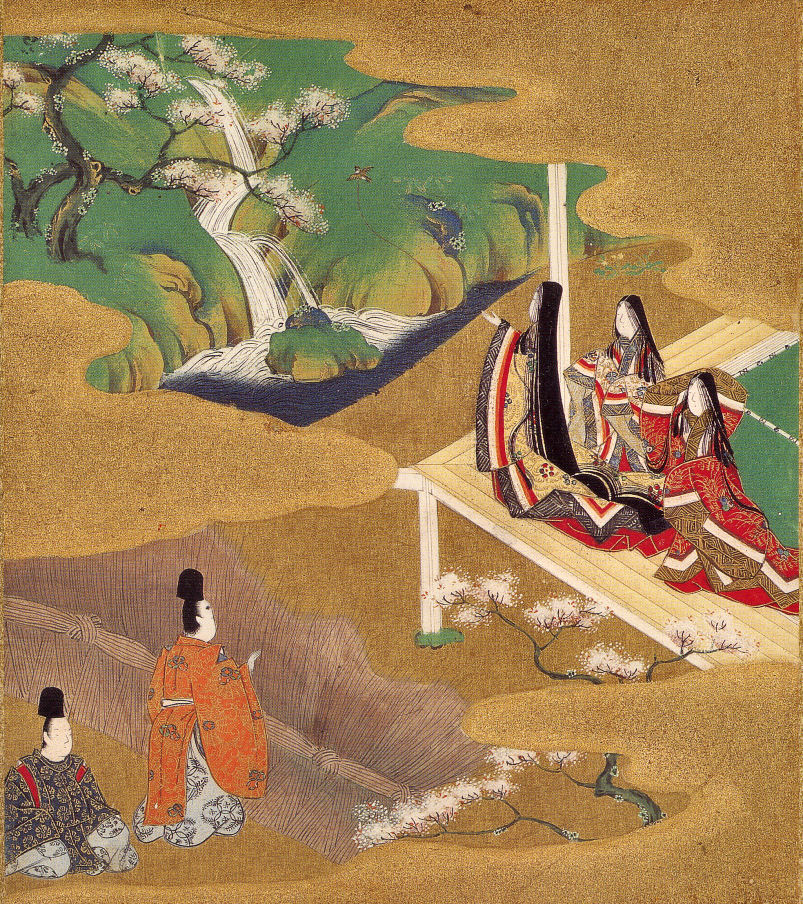
Heian-era courtiers and ladies-in-waiting with ankle-length hair, wearing multilayered jūnihitoe. (Tosa Mitsuoki, c. late 17th century)

The houses were cold and drafty in the winter, with few braziers available to the women whose multilayered jūnihitoe kept them warm, of which there are detailed descriptions in the work. Heian-period noble women dressed in six or seven garments, each layered over the next, some with multiple linings in differing hues and color combinations. The description of the clothing the ladies-in-waiting wore at an imperial event shows the importance of fashions, the arrangement of their layers, as well as Murasaki's keen observational eye:

The younger women wore jackets with five cuffs of various colors: white on the outside with dark red on yellow-green, white with just one green lining, and pale red shading to dark with one white layer interposed. They were the most intelligently arranged.

Combining layers of garments, each with multiple linings, to arrive at harmonic color combinations known as kasane no irome assumed an almost ritual fascination to the women. It required attention, and achieving an individual stylistic aesthetic was important. Colour combinations were referred to using names reflecting their season of wear, and though they took inspiration from nature, did not aim to faithfully reproduce its colours, instead aiming for an evocation of the season. Murasaki chronicles the significance of making a mistake at a courtly function when two women failed in a perfect color combination: "That day all the women had done their utmost to dress well, but [...] two of them showed a want of taste when it came to the color combinations at their sleeves [...] [in] full view of the courtiers and senior nobles."

=== Ladies-in-waiting ===
Murasaki suffered overwhelming loneliness, had her own concerns about ageing, and was not happy living at court. She became withdrawn, writing that perhaps the other women considered her stupid, shy or both: "Do they really look on me as such a dull thing, I wonder? But I am what I am [...] [Shōshi] too has often remarked that she thought I was not the kind of person with whom one could ever relax [...] I am perversely stand-offish; if only I can avoid putting off those for whom I have genuine respect." Keene speculates that as a writer who required solitude Murasaki's loneliness may have been "the loneliness of the artist who craves companionship but also rejects it". He points out she had "exceptional powers of discernment" and probably alienated the other women, about 15 or 16 of whom she describes in her diary. Although she adds praise for each woman, her criticism is more memorable because she saw through and described their flaws.

Her insights did not endear her to the other women at a court where intrigue, drama and scheming was the norm, yet for a novelist it was crucial. He believes that she needed to be aloof so as to be able to continue writing, but equally that she was intensely private, a woman who "chose not to reveal her true qualities" except to those who earned her trust and respect, as Shōshi had.

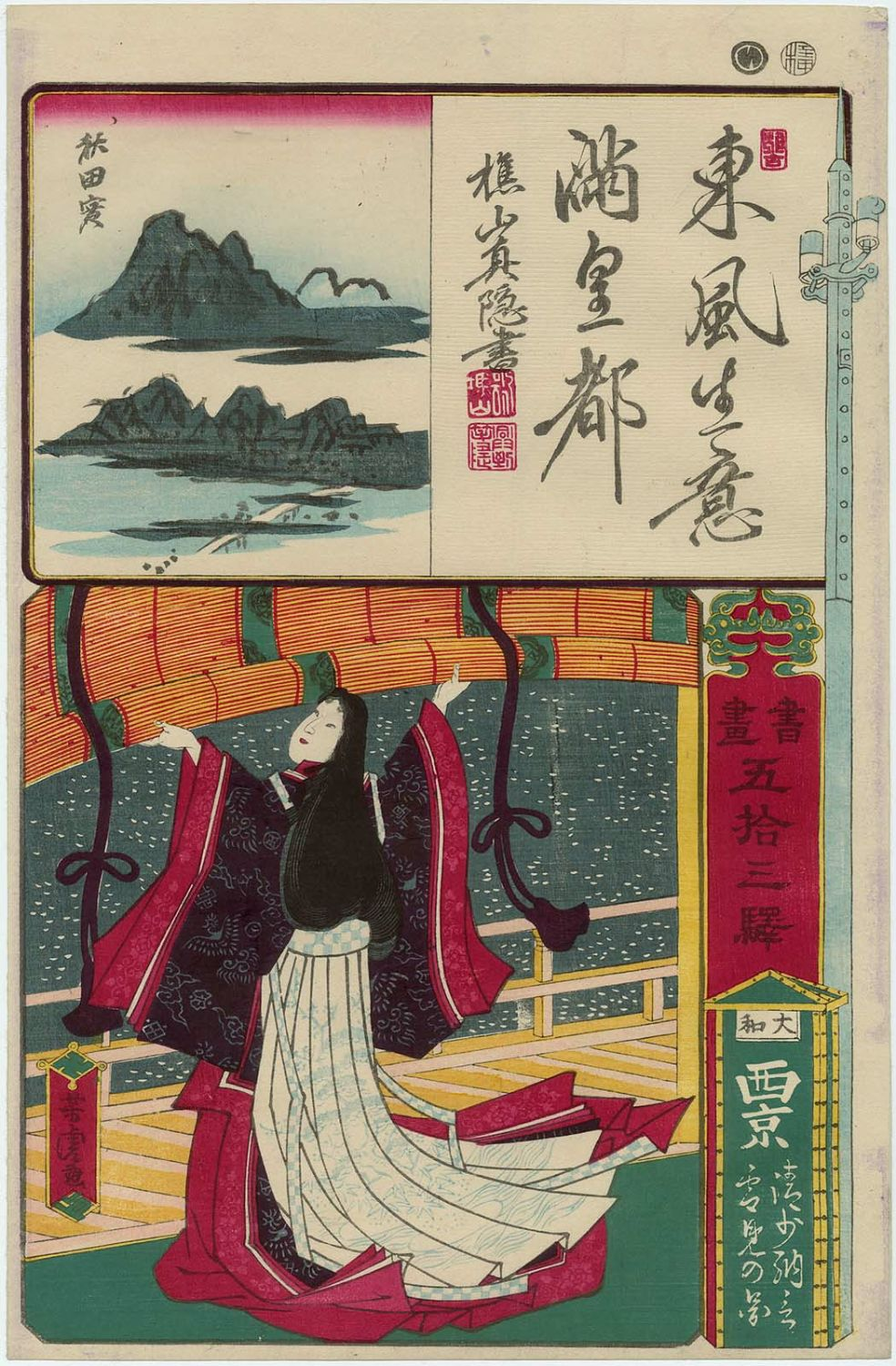
Sei Shōnagon depicted gazing at the snow, ukiyo-e print by Utagawa Yoshitora (1872)

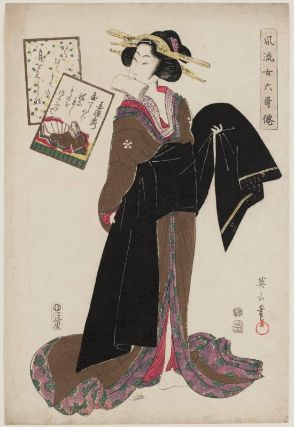
Rival poet Akazome Emon depicted in an 1811 ukiyo-e

The diary includes descriptions of other ladies-in-waiting who were writers, most notably Sei Shōnagon, who had been in service to Shōshi's rival and co-empress, Empress Teishi (Sadako). The two courts were competitive; both introduced educated ladies-in-waiting to their respective circles and encouraged rivalry among the women writers. Shōnagon probably left court after Empress Teishi's death in 1006, and it is possible the two never met, yet Murasaki was quite aware of Shōnagon's writing style and her character. She disparages Shōnagon in her diary:

Sei Shōnagon, for instance, was dreadfully conceited. She thought herself so clever and littered her writing with Chinese characters; but if you examined them closely, they left a great deal to be desired. Those who think of themselves of being superior to everyone else in this way will inevitably suffer and come to a bad end.

Murasaki is also critical of the two other women writers at Shōshi's court – poet Izumi Shikibu, and Akazome Emon who authored a monogatari. Of Izumi's writing and poetry she says:

Now someone who did carry on a fascinating correspondence is Izumi Shikibu. She does have a rather unsavoury side to her character but has a talent for tossing off letters with ease and seems to make the most banal statement sound special [...] she can produce poems at will and always manages to include some clever phrase that catches the attention. Yet, she [...] never really comes up to scratch [...] I cannot think of her as a poet of the highest rank.

=== The diary and The Tale of Genji ===
Murasaki's The Tale of Genji is barely mentioned in the diary. She writes the Emperor had the story read to him, and that colored papers and calligraphers had been selected for transcriptions of the manuscript – done by court women. In one anecdote she tells of Michinaga sneaking into her room to help himself to a copy of the manuscript. There are parallels between the later chapters of Genji and the diary. According to Genji scholar Shirane, the scene in the diary which describes Ichijo's imperial procession to Michinaga's mansion in 1008 corresponds closely to an imperial procession in chapter 33 ("Wisteria Leaves") of The Tale of Genji. Shirane believes the similarities suggest portions of Genji may have been written during the period Murasaki was in imperial service and wrote the diary.

== Style and genre ==
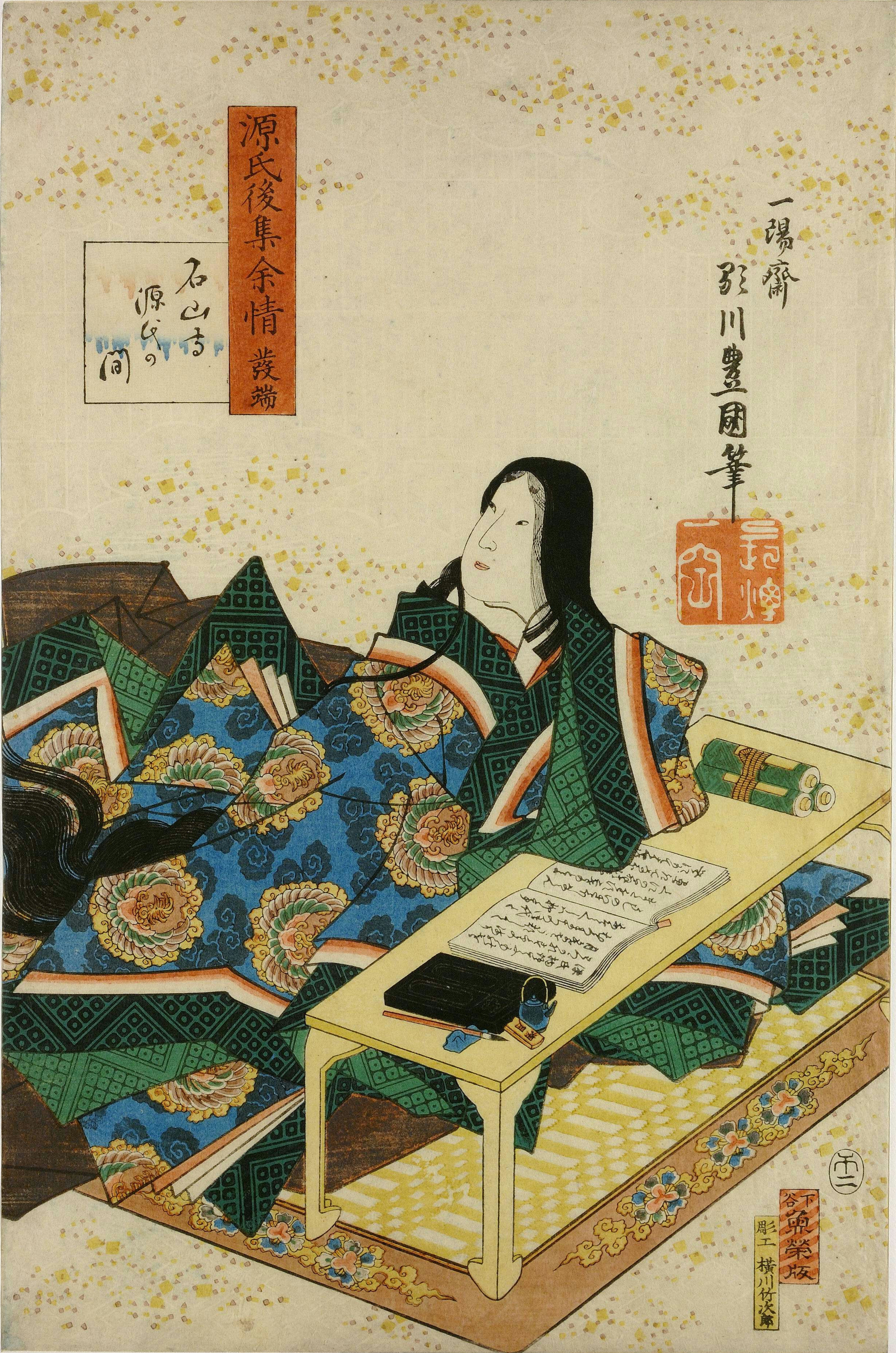
Murasaki at her desk, shown in a 19th-century ukiyo-e.

Heian-era diaries resemble autobiographical memoirs more than a diary in the modern sense. The author of a Heian-era diary (a nikki bungaku) would decide what to include, expand, or exclude. Time was treated in a similar manner – a nikki might include long entries for a single event while other events were omitted. The nikki was considered a form of literature, often not written by the subject, almost always written in third-person, and sometimes included elements of fiction or history. These diaries are a repository of knowledge about the Imperial Heian court, considered highly important in Japanese literature, although many have not survived in a complete state. The format typically included waka poetry, (Note: Waka are always 31 syllables with a measure of 5/7 or 7/5 syllables. In the diary, Murasaki used the so-called short form consisting of a measure of 5/7/5/7/7 syllables. See Bowring, xix) meant to convey information to the readers, as seen in Murasaki's descriptions of court ceremonies.

Few if any dates are included in Murasaki's diary and her working habits are not chronicled. It should not be compared to a modern 'writer's notebook', according to Keene. Although it chronicles public events, the inclusion of self-reflective passages is a unique and important part of the work, adding a human aspect unavailable in official accounts. According to Keene, the author is revealed as a woman with great perception and self-awareness, yet a person who is withdrawn with few friends. She is unflinching in her criticism of aristocratic courtiers, seeing beyond superficial facades to their inner core, a quality Keene says is helpful for a novelist but less useful in the closed society she inhabited.

Bowring believes the work contains three styles, each distinct from the other. The first is the matter-of-fact chronicle of events, a chronicle which otherwise would typically have been written in Chinese. The second style is found in the author's self-reflective analysis. He considers the author's self-reflections the best that have survived from the period, noting that Murasaki's mastery of introspective style, still rare in Japanese, reflects her contributions to the development of written Japanese in that she conquered the limits of an inflexible language and writing system. The epistolary section represents the third style, a newly developed trend. Bowring sees this as the weakest portion of the work, a section where she fails to break free of the rhythms of spoken language. He explains that the rhythms of spoken language assumes the presence of an audience, is often ungrammatical, relies on "eye contact, shared experiences and particular relationships [to] provide a background which allows speech to be at times fragmentary and even allusive". In contrast, written language must compensate for "the gap between the producer and receiver of the message". She may have been experimenting with the new style of writing, either producing a fictional letter or writing a real letter, but he writes that at the end of the section the writing is weaker, "degenerating into [...] disjointed rhythms that are characteristic of speech."

== Translations ==
In 1920, Annie Shepley Omori and Kochi Doi published Diaries of Court Ladies of Old Japan; this book combined their translation of Murasaki's diary with Izumi Shikibu's (The Izumi Shikibu nikki) and with the Sarashina nikki. Their translation had an introduction by Amy Lowell.

Richard Bowring published a translation in 1982, which contains a "lively and provocative" analysis.

In 2024, anthropologist Erick DuPree published a new English translation of The Diary of Murasaki Shikibu, accompanied by cultural and literary analysis informed by anthropological scholarship.

== 13th-century handscroll ==
In the 13th century, a handscroll of the diary was produced, the Murasaki Shikibu Nikki Emaki. The scroll, meant to be read from left to right, consists of calligraphy illustrated with paintings. Writing in "The House-bound Heart", Japanese scholar Penelope Mason explains that in an emakimono or emaki, a narrative reaches its full potential through the combination of the writer's and the painter's art. About 20 percent of the scroll has survived; based on the existing fragments, the images would have closely followed the text of the diary.

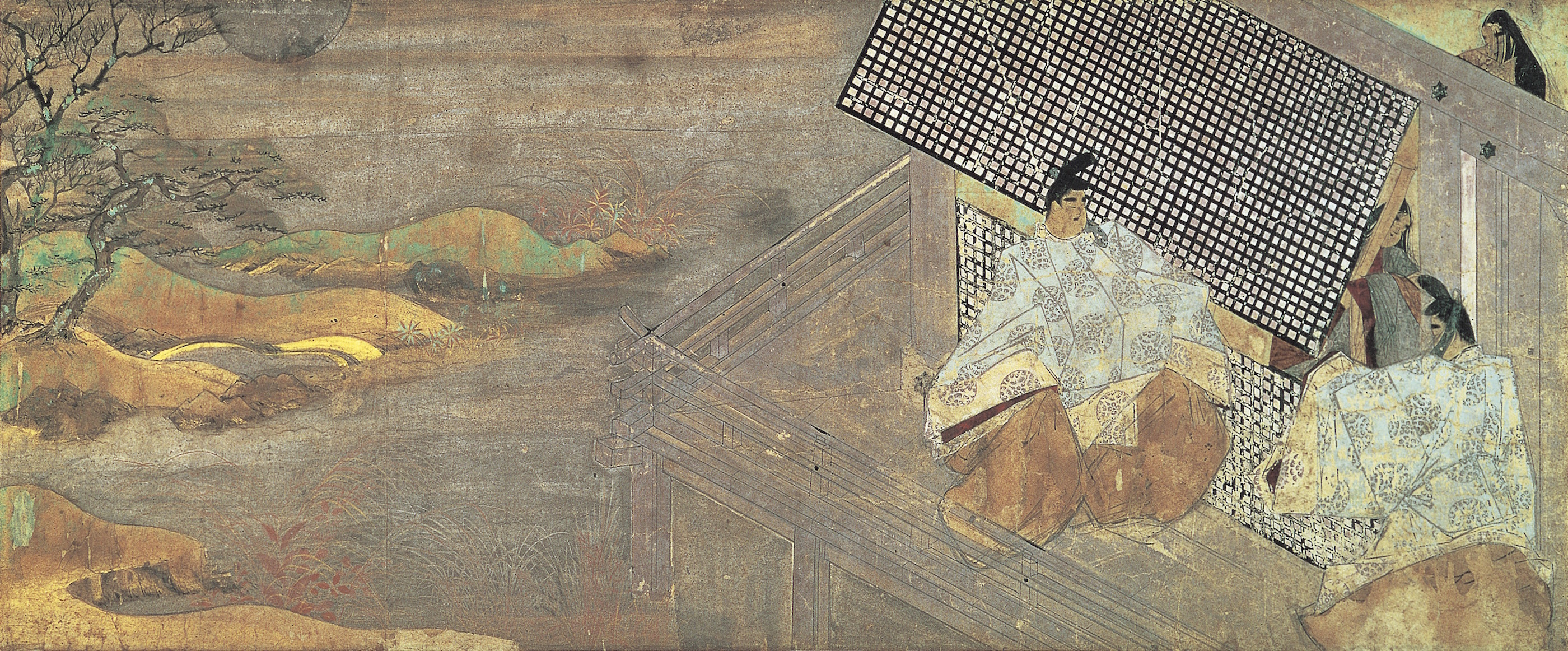
13th-century emakimono painting showing a scene of two courtiers trying to gain entrance to the women's quarters. Murasaki is barely visible on the right. The work is a National Treasure of Japan, held at the Gotoh Museum.

The illustrations in the emaki follow the late-Heian and early Kamakura period convention of Hikime kagibana ('line-eye and hook-nose') in which individual facial expressions are omitted. Also typical of the period is the style of fukimuki yatai ('blown-off roof') depictions of interiors which seem to be visualized from above looking downward into a space. According to Mason, the interior scenes of human figures are juxtaposed against empty exterior gardens; the characters are 'house-bound'.

In the diary Murasaki writes of love, hate and loneliness, feelings which make the illustrations, according to Mason, of the "finest extant examples of prose-poetry narrative illustrations from the period". Mason finds the illustration of two young courtiers opening the lattice blinds to enter the women's quarters particularly poignant, because Murasaki tries to hold the lattice shut against their advances. The image shows that the architecture and the men who keep her away from the freedom of the garden to the right.

The scroll was discovered in 1920 in five segments by Morikawa Kanichirō (森川勘一郎). The Gotoh Museum holds segments one, two and four; the Tokyo National Museum holds the third segment; the fifth remains in a private collection. The portions of the emakimono held at the Gotoh museum have been designated as National Treasures of Japan.

== Gallery ==
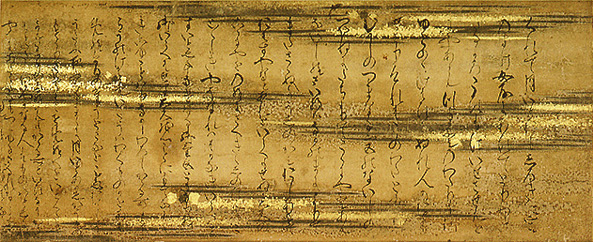
Leaf from the diary with calligraphy attributed to Kujō Yoshitsune, held at Gotoh Museum.

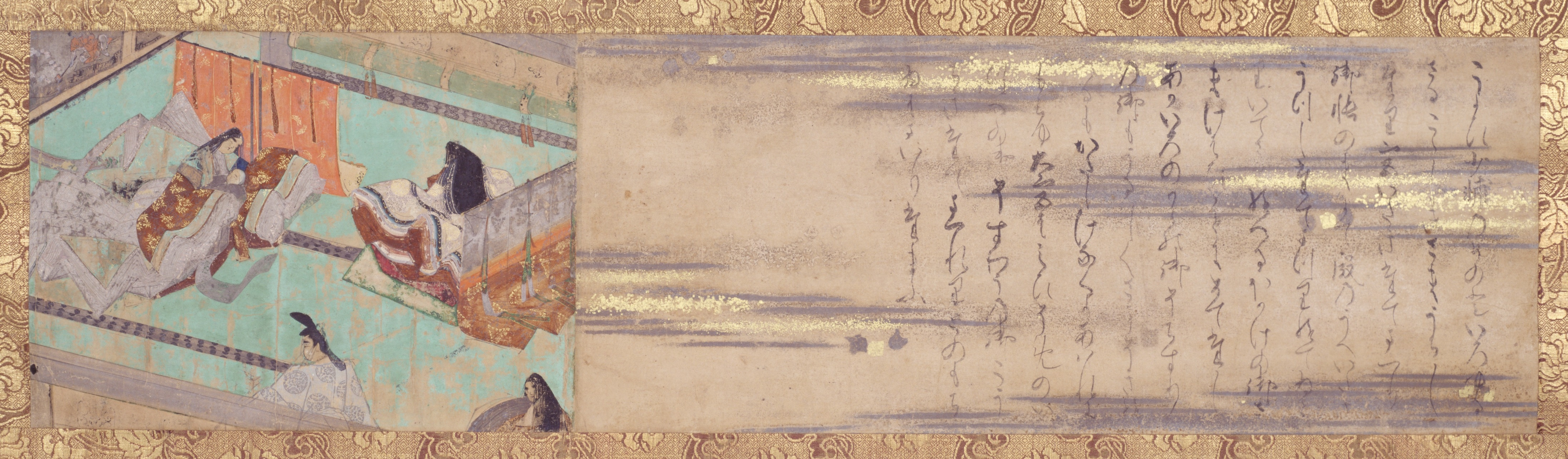
Fragment of the emaki showing, on the left, an illustration of Shoshi with her newborn son, and on the right the text written in calligraphy.
