= Fujiwara no Norimichi =

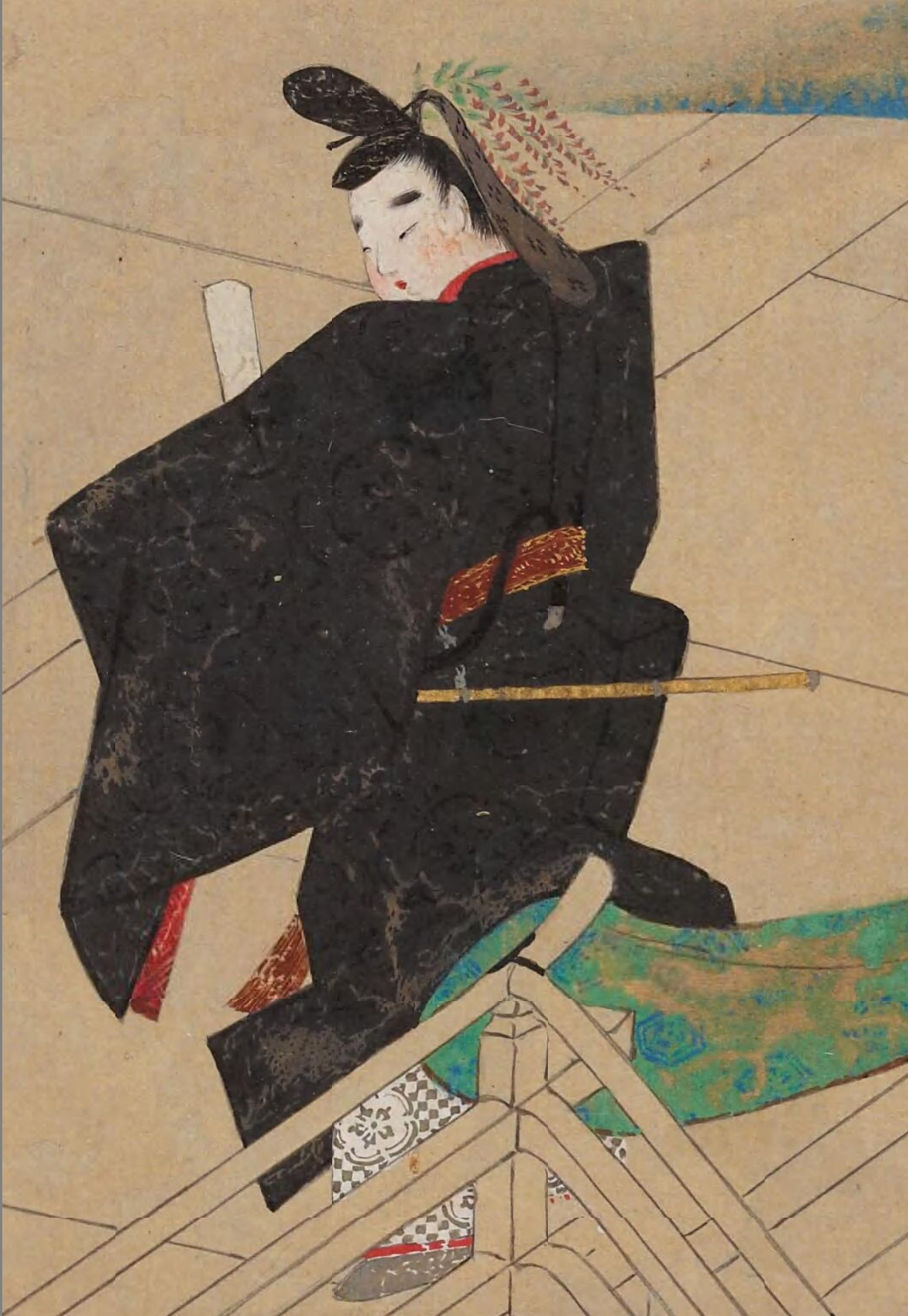

Tōshi no Chōja
- In office 22 January 1065 – 6 November 1075
- Preceded by: Fujiwara no Yorimichi
- Succeeded by: Fujiwara no Morozane

Naidaijin
- In office 4 September 1021 – 24 August 1047
- Preceded by: Fujiwara no Yorimichi
- Succeeded by: Fujiwara no Yorimune

Minister of the Right
- In office 24 August 1047 – 15 August 1060
- Preceded by: Fujiwara no Sanesuke
- Succeeded by: Fujiwara no Yorimune

Minister of the Left
- In office 15 August 1061 – 1 June 1069
- Preceded by: Fujiwara no Yorimichi
- Succeeded by: Fujiwara no Morozane

Kampaku
- In office 20 May 1068 – 6 November 1075
- Preceded by: Fujiwara no Yorimichi
- Succeeded by: Fujiwara no Morozane

Daijō-daijin
- In office 6 April 1070 – 6 September 1071
- Preceded by: Fujiwara no Yorimichi
- Succeeded by: Fujiwara no Nobunaga

Personal details
- Born: 29 July 996
- Died: 6 November 1075 (aged 79)
- Spouse(s): Princess Shishi; Koshikibu no Naishi
- Children: Fujiwara no Kanshi
- Parent(s): Fujiwara no Michinaga; Minamoto no Rinshi
- Relatives: Emperor Go-Reizei (son-in-law)

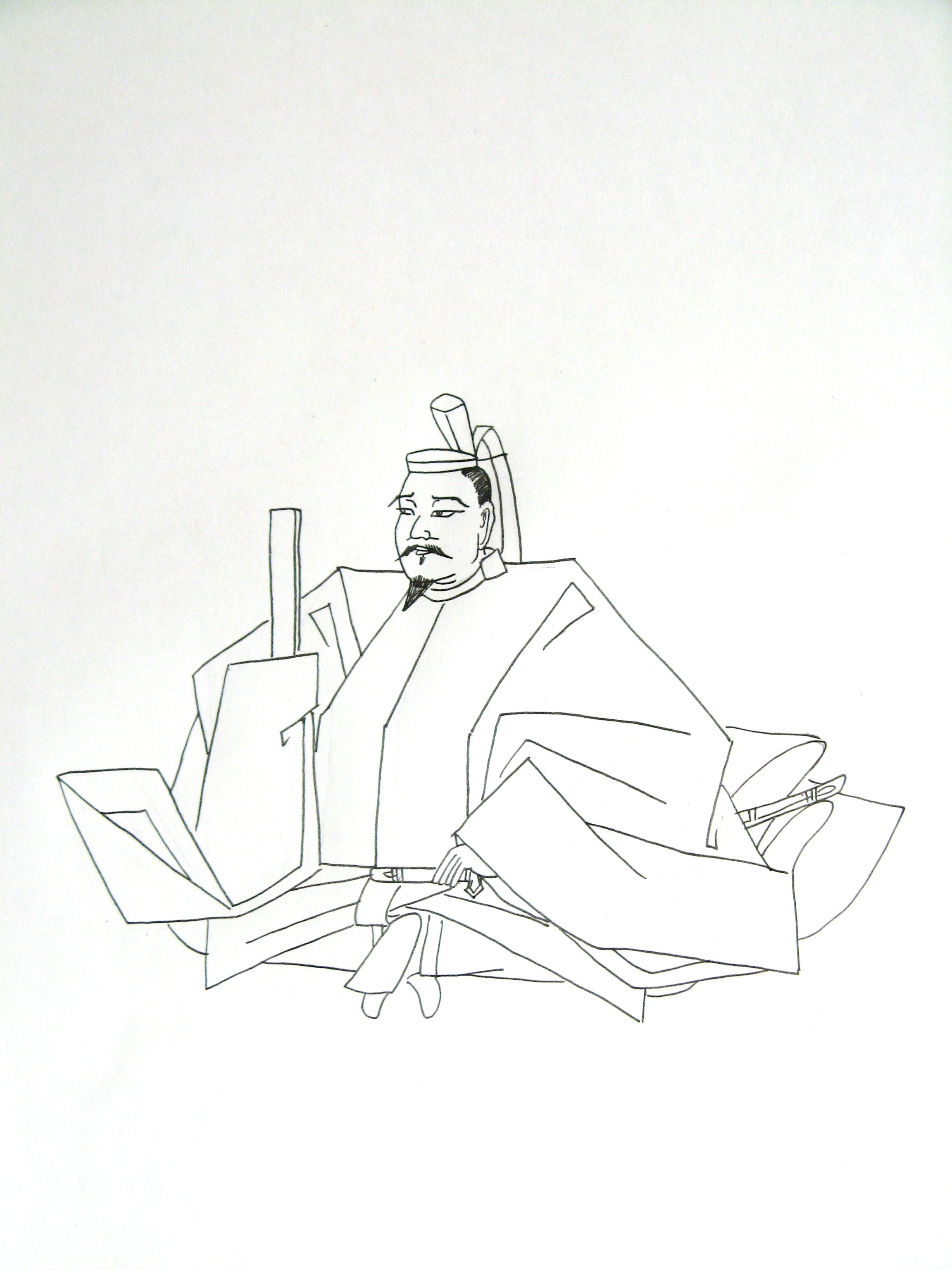
Fujiwara Norimichi.JPG

Fujiwara no Norimichi (藤原 教通; July 29, 996 – November 6, 1075), fifth son of Michinaga, was a kugyo of the Heian period. His mother was Minamoto no Rinshi (源 倫子), daughter of Minamoto no Masanobu. Regent Yorimichi, Empress Shōshi (consort of Emperor Ichijō), Empress Kenshi (consort of Emperor Sanjō) were his brother and sisters from the same mother. In 1068, the year when his daughter married Emperor Go-Reizei, he took the position of Kampaku, regent. He, however, lost the power when Emperor Go-Sanjo, who was not a relative of the Fujiwara clan, assumed the throne. This contributed to the later decline of the Fujiwara clan.

== Marriages and children ==
In 1012, he was married to a daughter of Fujiwara no Kinto by a daughter of Prince Akihira (son of Emperor Murakami), (1000–1024).

- Seishi (or Nariko) (生子) (1014–1068), - married to Emperor Go-Suzaku in 1039
- Shinshi (or Saneko) (真子) (1016–1087) - Naishi-no-kami 1042–1087
- Nobuie (信家) (1018–1061) - adopted by his uncle Yorimichi
- Michimoto (通基) (1021–1041)
- Kanshi (or Yoshiko) (歓子) (1021–1102) - Empress of Emperor Go-Reizei
- Nobunaga (信長) (1022–1094) - Daijō Daijin
- Jōkaku (静覚) (1025–1083) - provisional Major Bishop, Head priest of Gedatsu-ji (temple)

In 1026, he was married to Imperial Princess Shishi (禔子内親王) (1003–1048), daughter of Emperor Sanjō by Fujiwara no Seishi. From this marriage he had no children.

In 1051, he was married to Princess Senshi (嫥子女王) (1005–1074), the third daughter of Imperial Prince Tomohira (son of Emperor Murakami). From this marriage he had no children.

He was familiar with Koshikibu no Naishi (小式部内侍) (real name is unknown) (died 1025), daughter of Tachibana no Michisada and Lady Izumi Shikibu.

- Jōen (静円) (1016–1074) - provisional Archbishop
