= Fujiwara no Nobunaga =

Fujiwara no Nobunaga (藤原 信長; 1022 – October 14, 1094), third son of Norimichi, was a kugyo (Japanese noble) of the Heian period. His mother was a daughter of Fujiwara no Kintō. Although his father Norimichi was regent of Emperor Go-Sanjo and Emperor Shirakawa, Nobunaga could not become regent. After Norimichi's death, the position of regent was passed down the line of Yorimichi, the first son of Fujiwara no Michinaga. He became Daijō Daijin in 1080, but his order of precedence was next to Nobunaga's cousin regent Fujiwara no Morozane.
