= Hōjō-ji =

Coordinates: 35°01′20″N 135°46′06″E

Hōjō-ji (法成寺) was a Buddhist temple in Kyoto which was, for a time, one of the highest temples in Japanese Buddhism. The temple was built around the year 1017, by Fujiwara no Michinaga of the Fujiwara clan. The dedication of its Golden Hall in 1022 is detailed in the historical epic Eiga Monogatari. The Emperor Go-Ichijō attended the ceremony, and so every effort was made to ensure the ceremony was as lavish and perfect as possible.

According to the Eiga Monogatari, the Golden Hall's pillars rested on masonry supports in the shape of elephants, the roof tiles and doors were gilded and silvered, and the foundations were of rock crystal. The interior of the hall was decorated lavishly with gold, silver, lapis lazuli, and jewels of all kinds, as well as a series of images and murals detailing the life of the historical Buddha, and a central image of the Vairocana Buddha.

The temple was destroyed by fire in 1053 and not rebuilt.
