= Helen Craig McCullough =

American translator and Japanologist (1918–1998)

Helen Craig McCullough (February 17, 1918 – April 6, 1998) was an American academic, translator and Japanologist. She is best known for her 1988 translation of The Tale of the Heike.

== Early life ==
McCullough was born in California. She graduated from the University of California, Berkeley in 1939 with a degree in political science. Early in World War II, she studied Japanese at the U.S. Navy’s Language School in Boulder, Colorado. In 1950, she returned to Berkeley where she earned an MA and PhD. She married fellow Berkeley graduate student William H. McCullough.

== Career ==
McCullough was a scholar of classical Japanese poetry and prose. She was a lecturer at Stanford, where her husband William was on the faculty (1964-1969). In 1969, she and William both joined the Department of Oriental Languages at Berkeley, her alma mater, where she began as lecturer and later received tenure as Professor of Oriental Languages in 1975.

== Selected works ==
McCullough’s scholarly publications included 11 volumes of studies and translations. Her publications included the study Brocade by Night: 'Kokin Wakashu' and the Court Style in Japanese Classical Poetry and translations of major works of Japanese literature:

- Taiheiki a Chronicle of Medieval Japan
- Yoshitsune A 15th Century Japanese Chronicle
- The Tale of the Heike
- Kokin Wakashu: The First Imperial Anthology of Japanese Poetry
- Tales of Ise: Lyrical Episodes from 10th Century Japan (Ariwara no Narihira)
- Okagami, the Great Mirror: Fujiwara Michinaga (966-1027 and His Times : a Study and Translation)
- A Tale of Flowering Fortunes: Annals of Japan; Aristocratic Life. with William H. McCullough. Stanford University Press. 1980. ISBN 0804710392.; ISBN 9780804710398 (2 vols.) -- the Eiga Monogatari

== Honors ==
Her honors included several visiting professorships and a Medal of Honor from the Japanese government.
