= Fujiwara no Seishi =

Empress consort of Japan
- Tenure: 1012–1016
- Born: 972
- Died: April 25, 1025 (aged 52–53)
- Spouse: Emperor Sanjō
- Issue: Prince Atsuakira; Prince Atsunori; Prince Atsuhira; Princess Tōshi; Princess Shishi; Prince Moroakira
- House: Imperial House of Japan
- Father: Fujiwara no Naritoki

Fujiwara no Seishi (藤原娍子) (972–1025) was the consort of Emperor Sanjō of Japan.

== Biography ==
She was the first daughter of Fujiwara no Naritoki (藤原済時). Her father was the cousin of the regent Fujiwara no Michinaga.

She was arranged to marry the future Emperor one year after his succession. The Emperor already had an Empress, Fujiwara no Kenshi, who was the daughter of the regent Michinaga and cousin of Seishi. However, Fujiwara no Michinaga had introduced the custom of the Emperor having two Empresses: one called Chugu, and the other called Kogo. Fujiwara no Michinaga agreed for Fujiwara no Seishi to be given the title of Empress (as Kogo), but he demonstrated that Seishi was to have lower rank than his daughter in practice by making sure that virtually no one attended the ceremony in which Seishi was made Empress. When the courtiers were summoned to the elevation ceremony of the second Empress, they laughed at the messengers and gathered at the apartments of the Empress Kenshi instead.

Empress Seishi was reportedly well liked by the Emperor, but she was overshadowed at court by Empress Kenshi, and never managed to exert any influence. She became a nun in 1019, one year after her husband's abdication.

== Issue ==
- Imperial Prince Atsuakira (敦明親王) (994–1051), Emperor Go-Ichijō's Crown Prince; later, Ko-ichijō In (小一条院)
- Imperial Prince Atsunori (敦儀親王) (997–1054)
- Imperial Prince Atsuhira (敦平親王) (999–1049)
- Imperial Princess Tōshi (real pronunciation is unknown) (当子内親王) (1001–1023), 37th Saiō in Grand Shrine of Ise) 1012–1016
- Imperial Princess Shishi (real pronunciation is unknown) (禔子内親王) (1003–1048), spouse of Fujiwara no Norimichi (藤原教通)
- Imperial Prince Moroakira (師明親王) (1005–1085), lay priest under the name Seishin (性信) (second head priest of Ninna-ji Temple, 仁和寺)

== Notes ==
Japanese royalty
Preceded by Fujiwara no Shōshi	Empress consort of Japan; 1012–1016	Succeeded by Fujiwara no Kenshi
