= Koshikibu no Naishi =

Japanese poet (c. 999–1025)

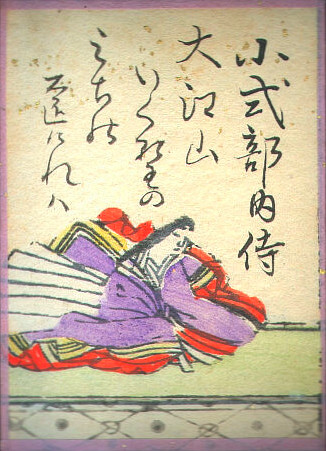
Koshikibu no Naishi, from the Ogura Hyakunin Isshu.

Koshikibu no Naishi (小式部内侍, c. 999 – November 1025) was a Japanese waka poet of the early eleventh century. One of her poems was included in the Ogura Hyakunin Isshu.

== Biography ==
She was the daughter of Izumi Shikibu and Tachibana no Michisada (橘道貞), the governor of Mutsu.

Starting around 1009, she joined her mother in serving Empress Shōshi.

A target of many suitors, she eventually married Fujiwara no Kiminari (藤原公成). They had a child, but she died thereafter, still in her late twenties.

== Poetry ==
Four of her poems were included in imperial anthologies such as the Goshūi Wakashū and the Kin'yō Wakashū.

=== Ōe-yama ===
The following poem by her was included as No. 60 in Fujiwara no Teika's Ogura Hyakunin Isshu:

Japanese text	Romanized Japanese	English translation
大江山 いく野の道の 遠ければ まだふみも見ず 天の橋立	Ōe-yama ikuno no michi no tookereba mada fumi mo mizu ama no hashidate	How could my mother help me write this poem? I have neither been to Ōe Mountain nor Ikuno nor have any letters come from her in a place so far away it's called— The Bridge to Heaven.

== In later literature ==
Numerous anecdotes about her were incorporated into later treatises on poetry (歌論書, karonsho) and setsuwa collections.

An otogizōshi, Koshikibu, was also written.

== Bibliography ==
- Keene, Donald (1999). A History of Japanese Literature, Vol. 1: Seeds in the Heart — Japanese Literature from Earliest Times to the Late Sixteenth Century. New York: Columbia University Press. ISBN 978-0-231-11441-7.
- McMillan, Peter. 2010 (1st ed. 2008). One Hundred Poets, One Poem Each. New York: Columbia University Press. ISBN 9780231143998
- Suzuki Hideo, Yamaguchi Shin'ichi, Yoda Yasushi. 2009 (1st ed. 1997). Genshoku: Ogura Hyakunin Isshu. Tokyo: Bun'eidō.
