= Izumi Shikibu =

Japanese poet

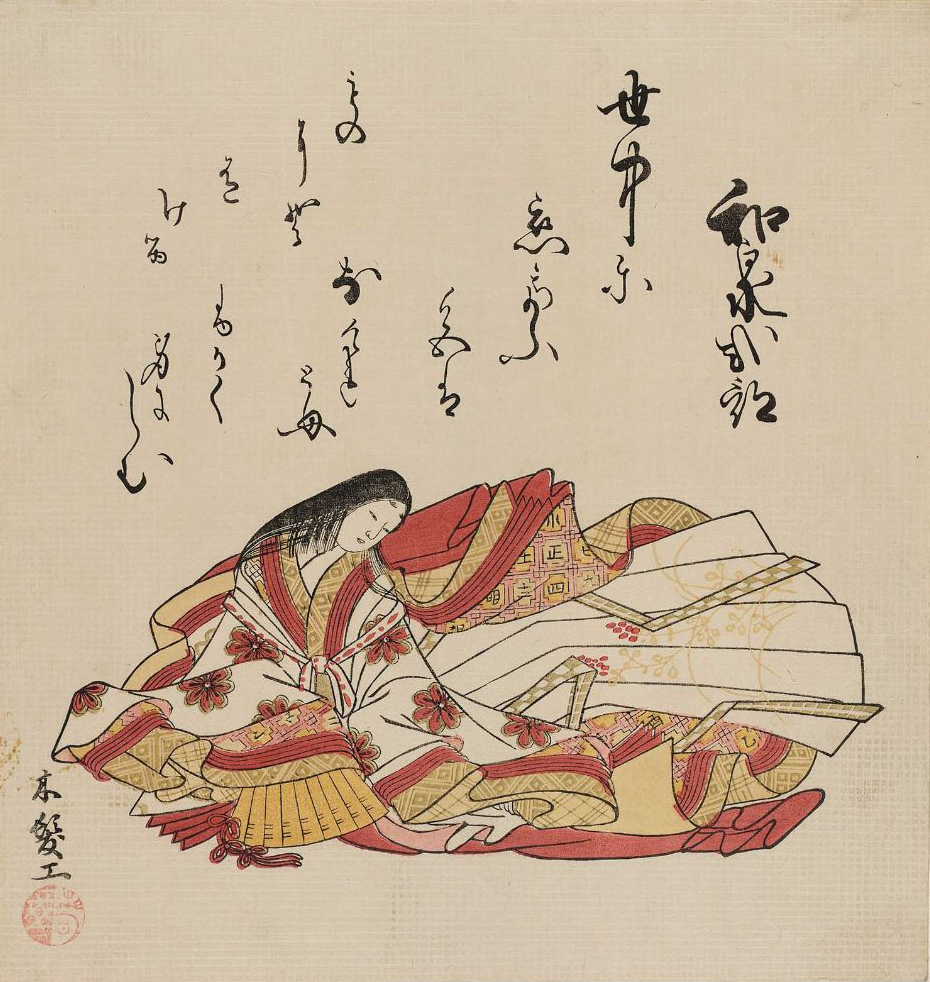
Izumi Shikibu, shown here in a c. 1765 Kusazōshi by Komatsuken, was a poet at Empress Shoshi's court.

Izumi Shikibu (Japanese: 和泉式部; born 976?) was a mid-Heian period Japanese poet. She is a member of the Thirty-six Medieval Poetry Immortals (中古三十六歌仙, chūko sanjurokkasen). She was the contemporary of Murasaki Shikibu, and Akazome Emon at the court of empress Joto Mon'in.

She "is considered by many to have been the greatest woman poet of the Heian period". Her legacy includes 242 poems and two kashu.

"Torn between worldly ties and physical desire, Izumi Shikibu left a wealth of passionate love poetry, fueling rumors that purported that she was a femme fatale with numerous lovers besides her two husbands and two princely lovers."

== Early life ==
Izumi Shikibu was the daughter of Oe no Masamune, governor of Echizen. Her mother was the daughter of Taira no Yasuhira, governor of Etchu. In 995, at the age of 20, Izumi was married to Tachibana no Michisada, governor of Izumi, the origin for her name. Their daughter was born in 997, Koshikibu no Naishi, who also became a poet. However, Izumi soon divorced, and her former husband died soon afterwards.

As is standard for Heian period women, her name is a composite of "Izumi" from her husband's charge (任国, ningoku) and her father's official designation of master of ceremony (式部, shikibu).

=== Affairs and marriages ===
She had a sequence of affairs at the imperial court in Kyoto. In the beginning, before her marriage to Michisada, she is believed to have been the companion (some accounts say wife) of a man named Omotomaru at dowager Queen Shoko's court.

While still married to Michisada, she fell in love and had an affair with Emperor Reizei's third son, Prince Tametaka (Danjo no Miya Tametaka Shinnō:弾正宮為尊親王 977–1002). As a result of the scandal her husband divorced her and her family disowned her. The Eiga Monogatari implies that Tametaka fell ill and died because of his "continual nocturnal escapades."

After Tametaka's death, she was courted by Prince Atsumichi (敦道親王, Atsumichi Shinnō; 981–1007), Tametaka's brother. The first year of this affair is described in her semi-autobiographical Diary. Her motive in writing the diary "seems to have been written solely to appease her mind, and to record the poems which passed between them." Izumi then moved into Atsumichi's residence, and the two had a very public courtship until Atsumichi's death in 1007 at the age of 27.

Soon after, probably in 1009, Izumi joined the court of Fujiwara no Shōshi, who was the daughter of Fujiwara no Michinaga, and the consort of Emperor Ichijō.

Further testimony of the scandal caused by her successive affairs with the Princes Tametaka and Atsumichi can be found in two historical tales (rekishi monogatari) about the period, A Tale of Flowering Fortunes (or Eiga Monogatari), c. mid-eleventh century, and The Great Mirror (or Ōkagami), c. late eleventh century.

== Diary ==
Izumi Shikibu Nikki was written at the beginning of Izumi's relationship with Prince Atsumichi and continues for about nine months (1003–1004). Written in a third person narrative, the diary contains waka poetry, with over one hundred poems including renga. The "plot" is one of "alternate ardor and indifference on the part of the Prince, and timidity and yearning on the part of Izumi."

Her important work is present in the Izumi Shikibu Collection (和泉式部集, Izumi Shikibu-shū) and the imperial anthologies. Her life of love and passion earned her the nickname of The Floating Lady (浮かれ女, ukareme) from Michinaga.

Also at the court at the same time as Izumi were Akazome Emon, Murasaki Shikibu, and Ise no Taifu.

== Later years ==
While at the court in 1009, she married Fujiwara no Yasumasa (958–1036), a military commander under Michinaga famous for his bravery, and left the court to accompany him to his charge in Tango Province. She outlived her daughter Koshikibu no Naishi, but the year of her death is unknown. The last Imperial correspondence from her was a poem written in 1027. The Eiga Monogatari includes this poem, which accompanied Yasumasa's offering of jewels for a Buddha figure "made in memory of the Empress Dowager Yoshiko."

She later devoted herself to Buddhism, donning Buddhist robes that she wore for the rest of her life. Her Dharma name was Seishin Insei Hōni (誠心院専意法尼).

== Legacy ==
In contemporary arts, the Opéra National de Paris and the Grand Théâtre de Genève jointly commissioned an opera based on her poems. Titled Da gelo a gelo by Salvatore Sciarrino and sung in Italian, the work draws on 65 poems from Izumi Shikibu Nikki that features her passion for Prince Atsumichi. It was performed in early 2008 in Geneva with the Chamber Orchestra of Geneva.

== Poetry ==
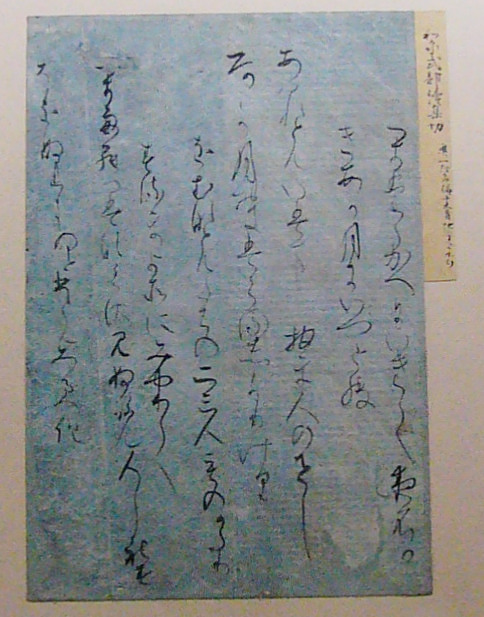
A page 2nd collected works of Izumi Shikibu 12th century

- 刈藻かき臥猪の床のゐを安み
  さこそねざらめ斯らずもがな
  karu mo kaki fusu wi no toko no wi wo yasumi sa koso nezarame kakarazu mo gana
  loosely: Trampling the dry grass the wild boar makes his bed, and sleeps. I would not sleep so soundly even were I without these feelings.
  (Goshūi Wakashū 14:821)
  黒髪のみだれも知らず打臥せば
  まづかきやりし人ぞ戀しき
  kurokami no midaremo shirazu uchifuseba madzu kakiyarishi hito zo kohishiki
  loosely: My black hair is unkempt; unconcerned, he lies down and first gently smooths it, my darling!
  (Goshūi Wakashū 13:755)
  長閑なる折こそなけれ花を思ふ心の
  うちに風はふかねど
  nodoka naru ori koso nakere hana wo omou kokoro no uchi ni kaze wa fukanedo
  loosely: "There is not even a moment of calmness. In the heart that loves the blossoms, the wind is already blowing."
  ()
- A large number of her poems are poems of lamentation (哀傷歌, aishō no uta). A few examples, first to Tametaka:
  亡人のくる夜ときけど君もなし
  我が住む宿や魂無きの里
  naki hito no kuru yo to kikedo kimi mo nashi wa ga sumu yado ya tamanaki no sato
  loosely: They say the dead return tonight, but you are not here. Is my dwelling truly a house without spirit?
  (Goshūi Wakashū 10:575)
  Upon seeing her daughter Koshikibu no Naishi's name on her Imperial robes she received after her death:
  諸共に苔のしたには朽ちずして
  埋もれぬ名をみるぞ悲しき
  morotomo ni koke no shita ni ha kuchizu shite udzumorenu na wo miru zo kanashiki
  loosely: Beneath the moss, imperishable, her name of high renown: seeing it is a great sadness.
  (Kin'yō Wakashū 10:620)

== Bibliography ==
- Edwin Cranston (1969). The Izumi Shikibu Diary: A Romance of the Heian Court. Harvard University Press. ISBN 978-0-674-46985-3.
- Hiroaki Sato (2008). Japanese women poets: an anthology. M.E. Sharpe, Inc.
- Earl Miner; Hiroko Odagiri; Robert E. Morrell (1985). The Princeton Companion to Classical Japanese Literature. Princeton University Press. pp. 170–171. ISBN 0-691-06599-3.
- Shūichi Katō (October 1995). A History of Japanese Literature. Kodansha. ISBN 1-873410-48-4.
- Janet Walker (June 1977). "Poetic Ideal and Fictional Reality in the Izumi Shikibu nikki". Harvard Journal of Asiatic Studies. 37 (1). Harvard Journal of Asiatic Studies, Vol. 37, No. 1: 135–182. doi:10.2307/2718668. JSTOR 2718668.
- Jane Hirshfield; Mariko Aratani (1990). The Ink Dark Moon: Love Poems by Ono no Komachi and Izumi Shikibu, Women of the Ancient Court of Japan. New York: Vintage Books. ISBN 0-679-72958-5.
