= Akazome Emon =

Japanese poet

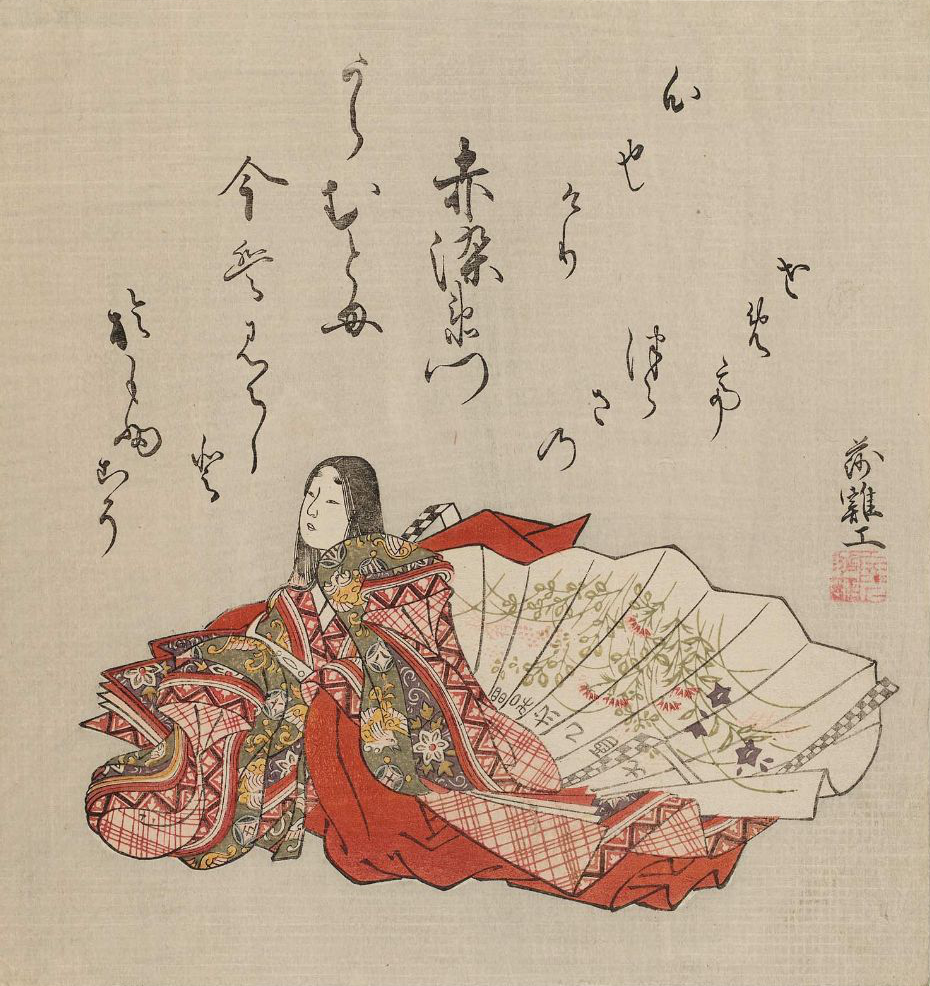
Akazome Emon depicted in c. 1765 ink and color Kusazōshi by Komatsuken

Akazome Emon (赤染衛門; late 950s or early 960s – 1041 or later) was a Japanese waka poet and early historian who lived in the mid-Heian period. She is a member both of the Thirty Six Elder Poetic Sages (中古三十六歌仙, Chūko Sanjūrokkasen) and the Thirty-Six Immortal Women Poets.

== Biography ==
Akazome Emon's year of birth is unknown, but she was likely born between Tentoku 1 (957) and Kōhō 1 (964). She was officially the daughter of Akazome Tokimochi, but the late-Heian karonsho (book of poetic criticism) Fukuro-zōshi records that her biological father was her mother's first husband, Taira no Kanemori.

A poetic exchange between Emon and Fujiwara no Michitaka, dating to around Ten'en 2 (974) to Jōgen 2 (977), when she was likely in her late teens, is the earliest dateable event in her life. At roughly this time, she went to serve in the household of Minamoto no Masanobu, and for a long time thereafter she served his daughter Rinshi (ja), the wife of Fujiwara no Michinaga.

It was also around this time (Ten'en–Jōgen) that she married Ōe no Masahira, a Confucian scholar and poet of both waka and kanshi. They had a son, Ōe no Takachika, a daughter, Gō Jijū (江侍従), and one more daughter. The couple were considered to be "lovebirds" (おしどり夫婦, oshidori fūfu).

According to her personal waka collection, the Akazome Emon Shū (赤染衛門集), when Masahira was twice sent to serve in Owari Province, she accompanied him both times. The collection also indicates that she worked to ensure her son's professional success at court and presented poems as offerings to Sumiyoshi Shrine when he fell ill. The Fukuro-zōshi portrays her as gently supporting her husband when he was overwhelmed by his official duties. These works present Emon as a good wife and wise mother (良妻賢母 ryōsai kenbo). She also devoted much effort to her service as Rinshi's lady-in-waiting.

In Chōwa 1 (1012), her husband died, and a few years later Emon became a nun. She apparently lived a long and tranquil life from this point, living to see the birth of her great-grandson Ōe no Masafusa in Chōkyū 2 (1041).

Akazome Emon served Minamoto no Rinshi and Fujiwara no Shōshi, who were, respectively, the wife and daughter of Fujiwara no Michinaga, and she was present at the Imperial court at the same time as Izumi Shikibu. She was a contemporary of Murasaki Shikibu, who praised her writing, and Sei Shōnagon.

The year of her death is uncertain, but she probably lived until at least 1041.

== Poetry and other writings ==
Emon remained active in waka composition until late in life, contributing poems to uta-awase competitions on the sixteenth day of the fifth month of Chōgen 8 (1035), the Kanpaku-Sadaijin-ke Uta-awase (関白左大臣家歌合), and 1041, the Kokiden no Nyōgo Uta-awase (弘徽殿女御歌合). She also contributed a screen poem (屏風歌 byōbu-uta) to celebrate Rinshi's seventieth year, in 1033.

She left a personal collection, the Akazome Emon Shū, and she is also believed to have been the writer of the first part of Eiga Monogatari. Her poetry was incorporated into court anthologies from the Shūi Wakashū on. She ranks fourth in the number of her poems that were included in the Goshūi Wakashū, with a total of 32. More than 60 of her poems were included in the Kin'yō Wakashū and later court anthologies.

In her article on Emon, Hiroko Saitō called her poetic style unexceptional.

== Cited works ==
- Saitō, Hiroko (1986). "Akazome Emon". In Inukai, Kiyoshi; Inoue, Muneo; Ōkubo, Tadashi; Ono, Hiroshi; Tanaka, Yutaka; Hashimoto, Fumio; Fujihira, Haruo (eds.). Waka Daijiten (in Japanese). Tokyo: Meiji Shoin. p. 3. ISBN 4-625-40029-5.
