= Nairan =

Ancient Japanese government process

In the ancient Japanese government, nairan (内覧) was the inspection of documents submitted to the tennō (emperor), or the position held by those who performed the inspection.

The tennō usually gave a nairan-no-senji (内覧の宣旨, an imperial edict of inspection) to the regent (either a sesshō or kampaku).
