= Fujiwara no Akimitsu =

Japanese bureaucrat (944–1021)

Fujiwara no Akimitsu (藤原 顕光; 944 – July 7, 1021)

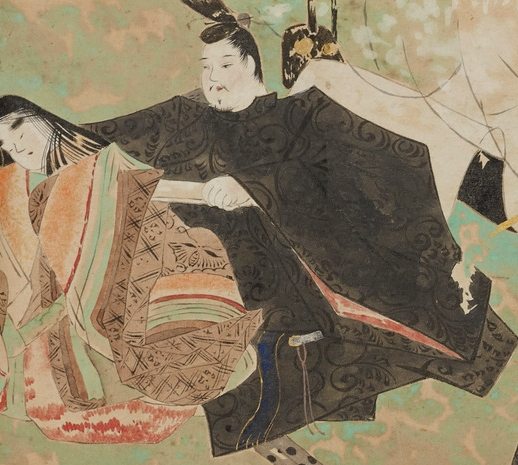

was a Japanese Heian period bureaucrat, who held the post of Sadaijin (Minister of the Left). His father was Fujiwara no Kanemichi.

Akimitsu is known for having been involved in a strange set of circumstances regarding his daughter, En-shi. En-shi was married to the Emperor's son, Imperial Prince Atsuakira (敦明親王) (later, Ko-Ichijō In, 小一条院). When Imperial Prince Atsuakira chose to take on a daughter of Fujiwara no Michinaga as a second wife in return for declination from Crown Prince, En-shi grew spiteful and turned to Akimitsu for help. She died soon afterwards of grief, and Akimitsu is said to have asked an onmyoji named Ashiya Dōman to cast a spell or curse on Michinaga. Akimitsu thus came to be known as Akuryō-safu (悪霊左府), meaning "the safu (=Sadaijin) with evil spirits."
