= Fujiwara no Kenshi (994–1027) =

Fujiwara no Kenshi 藤原妍子

Empress consort of Japan
- Tenure: 1012–1016

Empress dowager of Japan
- Tenure: 1018–1027
- Born: 994
- Died: October 16, 1027
- Spouse: Emperor Sanjō
- Issue: Princess Teishi
- House: Imperial House of Japan
- Father: Fujiwara no Michinaga
- Mother: Minamoto no Rinshi (源倫子)

Fujiwara no Kenshi (藤原 妍子; 994 – October 16, 1027), also known as Empress Dowager Biwadono (枇杷殿皇太后), was an empress consort of the Japanese Emperor Sanjō.

== Biography ==
She was the second daughter of regent Fujiwara no Michinaga and Minamoto no Rinshi/Michiko. In 1004, she joined to the court and first was a lady-in-waiting for her older sister, Empress Shoshi. She later become the princess consort of Crown Prince Okasada, who had an other consort at that time, Fujiwara no Seishi, who gave birth to four sons and two daughters.

=== Empress ===
She was arranged to marry the future Emperor, when Emperor Sanjo ascended the throne in 1012, Kenshi was made Imperial Consort [ja], and in 1013, she became Chūgū (Empress Consort). During the prior imperial reign, Kenshi's father had introduced the custom of one Emperor having two Empresses, one with the title Chūgū, and the other with the title Kōgō. Fujiwara no Michinaga agreed for Fujiwara no Seishi to be given the title of Empress (Kōgō) but he demonstrated that Seishi was to have lower rank than his daughter in practice, by making sure that no one attended the ceremony in which Seishi was made Empress. When the courtiers were summoned to the elevation ceremony of the second Empress, they laughed at the messengers and gathered at the apartments of the Empress Kenshi instead.

While Empress Seishi was well liked by the Emperor, she was overshadowed in the role of Empress at court by Empress Kenshi. Kenshi was reportedly the beautiful, spoiled favorite of her father, and has been described as "willfully extravagant".

Kenshi had no son, she only had a daughter, who was born in 1013, Imperial Princess Teishi. Teishi later become the Empress of Japan, just like her mother.

=== Later life ===
Emperor Sanjo retired in 1016 and died the following year. Kenshi became the Empress Dowager but she was childless so she was not powerful as her sister, Shoshi.

She was ordained as a Buddhist nun on the same day that she died.

== Issue ==
- Imperial Princess Teishi (real pronunciation is unknown; 禎子内親王; Empress Dowager Yōmei-mon In, 陽明門院; 1013–1094), Empress (kōgō) to Emperor Go-Suzaku, mother of Emperor Go-Sanjō

== Notes ==
Japanese royalty
Preceded by Fujiwara no Seishi	Empress consort of Japan; 1012–1016	Succeeded by Fujiwara no Ishi
Preceded by Fujiwara no Shōshi	Empress dowager of Japan; 1018–1027	Succeeded by Fujiwara no Yoshiko (granted title posthumously)
