= Emperor Sanjō =

Emperor of Japan from 1011 to 1016

Emperor Sanjō 三条天皇
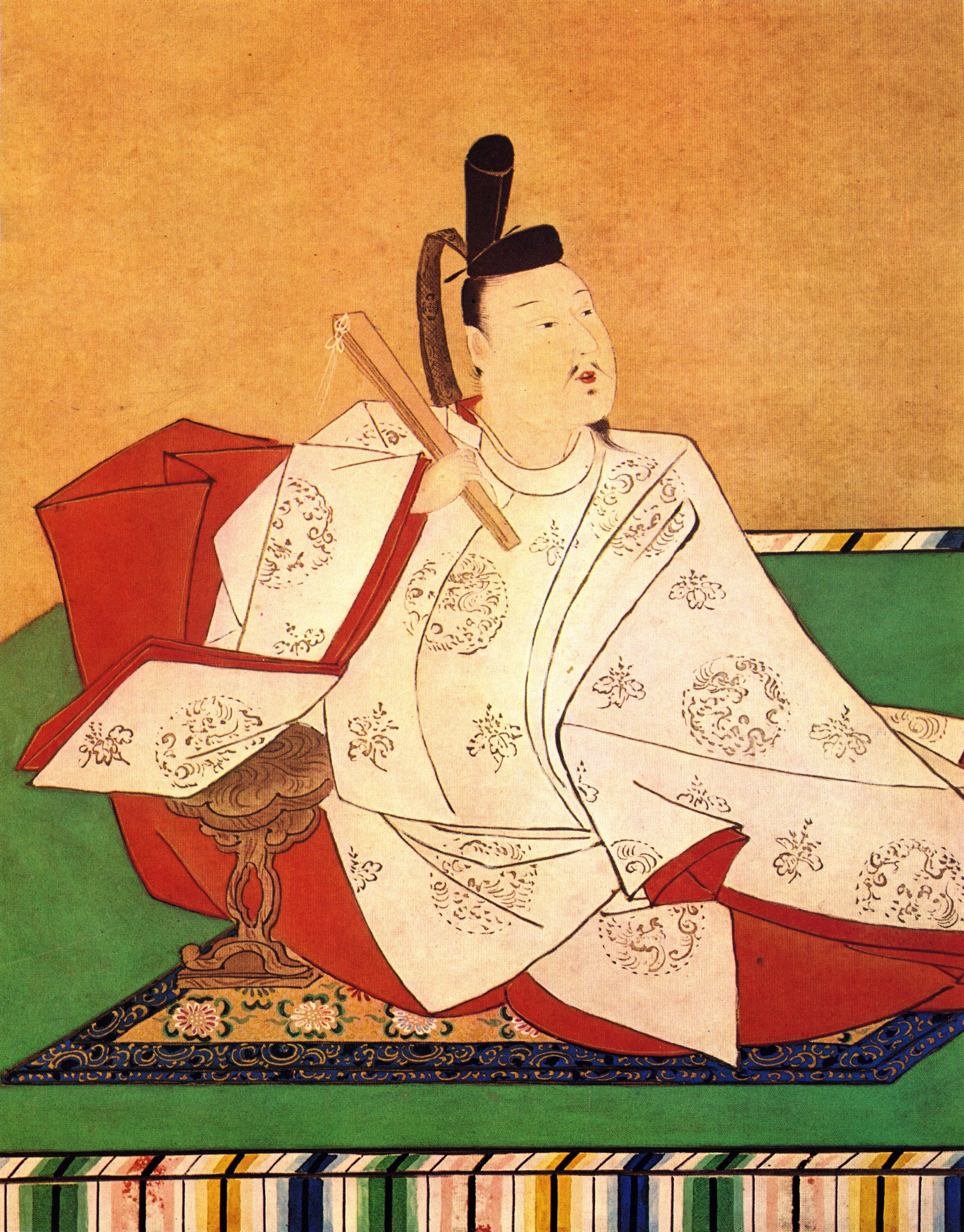
- Portrait of Emperor Sanjō by Kanō Tsunenobu, Edo period

Emperor of Japan
- Reign: July 16, 1011 – March 10, 1016
- Enthronement: November 13, 1011
- Predecessor: Ichijō
- Successor: Go-Ichijō
- Born: February 5, 976; Higashi Sanjo Palace (東三条第)
- Died: June 5, 1017 (aged 41); Sanjō In (三条院), Heian Kyō (Kyōto)
- Burial: Kitayama no misasagi (北山陵) (Kyoto)
- Spouses: Fujiwara no Seishi; Fujiwara no Kenshi
- Issue: Prince Atsuakira; Prince Atsunori; Prince Atsuhira; Princess Masako; Princess Shishi; Prince Moroakira; Princess Teishi
Posthumous name
- Tsuigō: Emperor Sanjō (三条院 or 三条天皇)
- House: Imperial House of Japan
- Father: Emperor Reizei
- Mother: Fujiwara no Chōshi

Emperor Sanjō (三条天皇, Sanjō-tennō; February 5, 976 – June 5, 1017) was the 67th emperor of Japan, according to the traditional order of succession.

Sanjō's reign spanned the years from 1011 through 1016.

== Biography ==
Before his ascension to the Chrysanthemum Throne, his personal name (imina) was Iyasada-shinnō. He was also known as Sukesada-shinnō, and as Okisada-shinnō (居貞親王).

Iyasada was the second son of Emperor Reizei. He was the half-brother of Emperor Kazan, who was Reizei's first-born son. Iyasada's mother was Fujiwara no Chōshi (藤原超子) (?-982), who was the daughter of the sesshō, Fujiwara no Kaneie. Chōshi was posthumously elevated to the rank of empress mother (Zō-Kōtaigō, 贈皇太后).

In ancient Japan, there were four noble clans, the Gempeitōkitsu (源平藤橘). One of these clans, the Minamoto clan (源氏) are also known as Genji, and of these, the Sanjō Genji (三条源氏) are descended from the 67th emperor Sanjō.

== Events of Sanjō's life ==
After his mother died when he was seven, his maternal grandfather Fujiwara no Kaneie raised him at Kaneie's mansion.

- August 23, 986 (Kanna 2, 16th day of the 7th month): Iyasada-shinnō was appointed as heir and crown prince at age 11. This followed the convention that two imperial lineages took the throne in turn, although Emperor Ichijō was in fact Iyasada's junior. He thus gained the nickname Sakasa-no moke-no kimi (the imperial heir in reverse). When Emperor Kazan abandoned the world for holy orders, this grandson of Kaneie ascended to the throne as Emperor Ichijō.
- July 16, 1011 (Kankō 8, 13th day of the 6th month): In the 25th year of Emperor Ichijō's reign (一条天皇二十五年), the emperor abdicated; and the succession (senso) was received by his cousin. Shortly thereafter, Emperor Sanjō is said to have acceded to the throne (sokui) at age 36.
- August 29, 1011 (Kankō 8, 22nd day of the 6th month): Daijō-tennō Emperor Ichijō died at the age of 32.
- August 30, 1011 (Kankō 8, 23rd day of the 8th month): Fujiwara Michinaga is granted the extraordinary privilege of travelling to and from the court by ox-drawn cart.
- November 28, 1011 (Kankō 8, 24th day of the 10th month): Daijō-tennō Reizei, who was Emperor Sanjō's father, died at age 62.
- 1011 (Kankō 8): Prince Atsunari, the second son of former-Emperor Ichijo, is proclaimed Crown Prince. Sanjō's eldest son, Prince Atsuakira, had been the officially designated heir; but pressure from Michinaga forced the young prince abandon his position.

Kaneie died in the early part of Ichijō's reign. His three uncles, sons of Kaneie, made their daughters consorts of Ichijo and each aimed to seize power as the grandfather of a future emperor. These courtiers therefore sought to exclude Okisada from the Imperial succession, though each of them married their daughter to him. Later Ichijō had two sons by Fujiwara no Shōshi, the daughter of Fujiwara no Michinaga, and Michinaga expected his grandson to ascend to the throne as soon as possible. Michinaga became the kampaku (regent) of Japan during the reign of Ichijō and expected to hold this position in Sanjō's government as well.

- 1012 (Chōwa 1): The era name was changed to mark Emperor Sanjō's accession; and in the 8th month, he married a daughter of kampaku Michinaga.
- 1013 (Chōwa 2, 3rd month): Sanjō sent an offering of grain to the gods of the 21 principal temples of Japan.
- 1013 (Chōwa 2, 9th month): Sanjō visited the home of Michinaga.
- 1013 (Chōwa 2, 11th month): Sanjō visited the Shrine of Iwashimizu Hachiman, and successive emperors would emulate his example visiting this shrine annually.
- 1013 (Chōwa 2, 12th month): Sanjō visited the Shrines of Kamo, and successive emperors would emulate his example visiting this shrine annually.
- 1013 (Chōwa 2, 12th month): Fujiwara no Masanobu, an officer of the chūgo's guard, was killed by Fujiwara no Korekane; and Michinaga ordered the assassin imprisoned.
- March 12, 1014 (Chōwa 3, 9th day of the 2nd month): The Imperial Palace is destroyed by fire.
- 1014 (Chōwa 3, 5th month): Sanjō visited the home of Michinaga where he enjoyed himself with horse riding and archery.
- 1015 (Chōwa 4, 9th month): The reconstruction of the palace is completed.
- 1015 (Chōwa 4, 10th month): Michinaga's 50th birthday is celebrated.
- 1015 (Chōwa 4, 11th month): The palace is again reduced to cinders after a devastating fire.
- 1016 (Chōwa 5, 1st month): Sanjō grew increasingly blind; he abdicated at the age of 40, having reigned for six years in the nengō Chōwa. He took the title Daijō-tennō.
- March 10, 1016 (Chōwa 5, 29th day of the 1st month): In the 6th year of Emperor Sanjō's reign (三条天皇6年), the emperor abdicated; and the succession (‘‘senso’’) was received by his cousin. Shortly thereafter, Emperor Go-Ichijō is said to have acceded to the throne (‘‘sokui’') at age 9.
- May 21, 1017 (Chōwa 6, 23rd day of the 4th month): The era name was changed to Kannin to mark the beginning of Emperor Go-Ichijō's reign.
- May 27, 1017 (Kannin 1, 29th day of the 4th month): Sanjō entered the Buddhist priesthood.
- June 5, 1017 (Kannin 1, 9th day of the 5th month): The former-Emperor Sanjō died at age 42. He was given the posthumous name of Sanjō-in (三条院) after the palace where he spent his life after abdication. During the Meiji Era, the in was dropped and replaced with tennō (Emperor).

The actual site of Sanjō's grave is known. This emperor is traditionally venerated at a memorial Shinto shrine (misasagi) at Kyoto.

The Imperial Household Agency designates this location as Sanjō's mausoleum. It is formally named Kitayama no misasagi.

Michinaga gifted Atsuakira a status equal to the retired emperor, with the title of Ko-ichijo-in. Although no son of Sanjō ascended to the throne, a future emperor (Emperor Go-Sanjō) was child of Princess Teishi, Sanjō's daughter, and thus his blood remained in the imperial bloodline.

=== Kugyō ===
Kugyō (公卿) is a collective term for the very few most powerful men attached to the court of the Emperor of Japan in pre-Meiji eras. Even during those years in which the court's actual influence outside the palace walls was minimal, the hierarchic organization persisted.

In general, this elite group included only three to four men at a time. These were hereditary courtiers whose experience and background would have brought them to the pinnacle of a life's career. During Sanjō's reign, this apex of the Daijō-kan included:

- Sesshō, Fujiwara no Michinaga (藤原道長), 1016–1017.
- Sadaijin, Fujiwara no Michinaga.
- Udaijin, Fujiwara no Akimitsu (藤原顕光)
- Naidaijin, Fujiwara no Kinsue (藤原公季)
- Dainagon

== Eras of Sanjō's reign ==
The years of Sanjō's reign are more specifically identified by more than one era name or nengō.

- Kankō (1004–1012)
- Chōwa (1012–1017)

== Consorts and children ==
- Empress (Kōgō): Fujiwara no Seishi (藤原娍子), Fujiwara no Naritoki's 1st daughter
  - First Son: Imperial Prince Atsuakira (敦明親王; 994–1051), Emperor Go-Ichijō's Crown Prince; later, Ko-ichijō In (小一条院)
  - Second Son: Imperial Prince Atsunori (敦儀親王; 997–1054)
  - Third Son: Imperial Prince Atsuhira (敦平親王; 999–1049)
  - First daughter: Imperial Princess Masako (当子内親王; 1001–1023), 37th Saiō in Grand Shrine of Ise) 1012–1016
  - Second daughter: Imperial Princess Shishi (real pronunciation is unknown) (禔子内親王; 1003–1048), married Fujiwara no Norimichi
  - Fourth Son: Imperial Prince Moroakira (師明親王; 1005–1085) later Imperial Prince Priest Seishin (性信入道親王), 2nd head priest of Ninna-ji Temple.
- Empress (Chūgū): Fujiwara no Kenshi (藤原妍子), Fujiwara no Michinaga's 2nd daughter
  - Third Daughter: Imperial Princess Teishi (禎子内親王) later Empress Dowager Yōmei-mon In (陽明門院), Empress (kōgō) to Emperor Go-Suzaku
- Consort (Nyōgo): Fujiwara no Yasuko (藤原綏子; 974–1004), Fujiwara no Kaneie's 3rd daughter
- Consort (Nyōgo): Fujiwara no Genshi (藤原原子; ca. 980–1002), Fujiwara no Michitaka's 2nd daughter

== Ancestry ==
Ancestors of Emperor Sanjō

8. Emperor Daigo (885-930)
4. Emperor Murakami (926-967)
9. Fujiwara no Onshi (885-954)
2. Emperor Reizei (950-1011)
10.Fujiwara no Morosuke (909-960) (=12)
5. Fujiwara no Anshi (927-964)
11.Fujiwara no Seishi (d. 943) (=13)
1. Emperor Sanjō
12.Fujiwara no Morosuke (909-960) (=10)
6. Fujiwara no Kaneie (929-990)
13.Fujiwara no Seishi (d. 943) (=11)
3. Fujiwara no Chōshi (954-982)
14.Fujiwara no Nakamasa
7. Fujiwara no Tokihime (d. 980)
15. Tachibana no Iwako

== Notes ==
Japanese Imperial kamon — a stylized chrysanthemum blossom

== See also ==
- Emperor of Japan
- List of Emperors of Japan
- Imperial cult
- Emperor Go-Sanjō

Regnal titles
Preceded by Emperor Ichijō	Emperor of Japan: Sanjō; 1011–1016	Succeeded by Emperor Go-Ichijō
