= Eiga Monogatari =

Literary work

Eiga Monogatari (栄花物語; trans., Story of Splendor) is a Japanese monogatari and epic account that relates events in the life of the imperial courtier Fujiwara no Michinaga. It is believed to have been written by a number of authors between 1028 and 1107 during the Heian era. It is notable for giving considerable credit to the Fujiwara family, especially Michinaga. It was translated into English by William H. and Helen Craig McCullough in 1980 as A Tale of Flowering Fortunes. It forms the basis for, and is frequently referenced in Fumiko Enchi's retelling, A Tale of False Fortunes.

== Summary ==
The monogatari is related both to official court histories, such as the Rikkokushi, and to other prose fiction, such as The Tale of Genji. It discusses the life and exploits of Michinaga and his family following his death. The first part, thirty volumes detailing the period from the reign of Emperor Uda until Michinaga's death, is believed to have been written between 1028 and 1034 by Akazome Emon and/or Fujiwara no Tamenari. The second portion comprises ten volumes covering part of the reign of Emperor Horikawa and is referred to collectively as the zokuhen. It is generally attributed to Idewa no Ben, and is thought to have been written between 1092 and 1107. The forty scrolls that comprise the text are written entirely in kana, and include many excerpts from diaries and notes of court ladies. Twenty-eight of these scrolls are devoted to Michinaga's role in imperial government, while the remaining twelve concern related topics, including other aspects of his life and the lives of other members of his family.

== Textual history ==
Depending on the form of the book, the textual lineage of the work is divided into three distinct lines: the ancient book lineage, the popular book lineage, and the variant lineage.

The main texts used include the Umezawa-bon and Yōmeibunko-bon (ancient book lineage); Nishihonganji-bon, Kokatsuji-bon, Meirekikan-bon, and Eirikyūkanshōshutsu-bon (popular book lineage); and Tomioka-bon (variant lineage).

Among these, the Umezawa-bon, the oldest extant complete manuscript, which was transcribed by the mid-Kamakura period, was acquired by Sanjōnishi Sanetaka and passed down to his progeny. It was designated a national treasure in 1935 under the contemporaneous Law for the Preservation of National Treasures, and again in 1955 under the Law for the Protection of Cultural Properties. The text is a combination of the Ōgata-bon (a mid-Kamakura period manuscript of the tale up to book 20) and the Masugata-bon (an early-Kamakura period manuscript of the tale up to book 40). The specifics of Sanetaka's acquisition of the text are detailed in the passages for the fourth and eighth days of the eleventh month of the sixth year of Eishō (1509). The Umezawa-bon is used as the base text for the publications from Iwanami bunko, Nihon koten bungaku taikei, Shinpen nihon koten bungaku zenshū.

== List of chapter titles ==
The English translations here are taken from Helen and William McCullough's translation of the first 30 chapters and from Takeshi Watanabe's online translations of the zokuhen chapters. Japanese readings are taken from the Nihon koten bungaku zenshū.

Chapter	Japanese	McCullough	Watanabe
01	Tsuki no en (月の宴)	"The Moon-Viewing Banquet"	
02	Kazan tadzunuru chūnagon (花山たづぬる中納言)	"The Middle Counselor's Quest at Kazan"	
03	Samazama no yorokobi (さまざまのよろこび)	"Joyous Events"	
04	Miwatenu yume (みはてぬ夢)	"Unfinished Dreams"	
05	Uraura no wakare (浦々の別れ)	"The Separation of the Brothers"	
06	Kakayaku fujitsubo (かかやく藤壺)	"Radiant Fujitsubo"	
07	Toribeno (鳥辺野)	"Toribeno"	
08	Hatsu hana (はつ花)	"First Flower"	
09	Iwakage (いわかげ)	"Iwakage"	
10	Hikage no katsura (日蔭のかつら)	"Cord Pendants"	
11	Tsubomi hana (つぼみ花)	"The Budding Flower"	
12	Tama no muragiku (玉のむら菊)	"Clustered Chrysanthemums"	
13	Yūshide (ゆふしで)	"Paper-Mulberry Strips"	
14	Asamidori (浅緑)	"Pale Blue"	
15	Utagai (うたがひ)	"Doubts"	
16	Moto no shizuku (もとの雫)	"A Drop of Moisture from a Stalk"	
17	Ongaku (音楽)	"Music"	
18	Tama no utena (玉の台)	"The Mansion of Jade"	
19	Onmogi (御裳着)	"The Putting On of the Train"	
20	Ōmuga (御賀)	"The Longevity Celebration"	
21	Nochikui no taishō (後くゐの大将)	"The Major Captain's Regrets"	
22	Tori no mai (とりのまひ)	"Dance of the Birds"	
23	Komakurabe no gyōgō (こまくらべの行幸)	"An Imperial Visit to the Horse Races"	
24	Wakabae (わかばえ)	"The Young Shoot"	
25	Mine no tsuki (みねの月)	"Moon Over the Peaks"	
26	Soō no yume (楚王の夢)	"The Dream of the King of Ch'u"	
27	Koromo no tama (ころもの玉)	"The Jewel in the Robe"	
28	Wakamidzu (わかみづ)	"New Water"	
29	Tama no kazari (玉のかざり)	"Jeweled Decorations"	
30	Tsuru no hayashi (鶴の林)	"Crane Grove"	
31	Tenjō no hanami (殿上の花見)		"The Flowering-Viewing Excursion of the Nobles"
32	Uta-awase (歌あはせ)		"The Poetry Contest"
33	Kiru wa wabishi to nageku nyōbō (きるはわびしと嘆く女房)		"The Grieving Attendant"
34	Kure matsu hoshi (暮まつ星)		"The Star that Awaits the Night"
35	Kumo no furumai (蜘蛛のふるまひ)		"The Spider's Antics"
36	Ne-awase (根あはせ)		"The Root-Matching Contest"
37	Keburi no ato (けぶりの後)		"After the Smoke"
38	Matsu no shidzu e (松のしづ枝)		"The Pines' Long Branches"
39	Nunobiki no taki (布引の滝)		"Like a Cloth Unfurled-The Nunobiki Waterfall"
40	Murasakino (紫野)		"Murasakino"

== See also ==
- Japanese Historical Text Initiative
