= Fujiwara no Michinaga =

Japanese statesman

Junior First Rank Fujiwara no Michinaga
- 藤原 道長
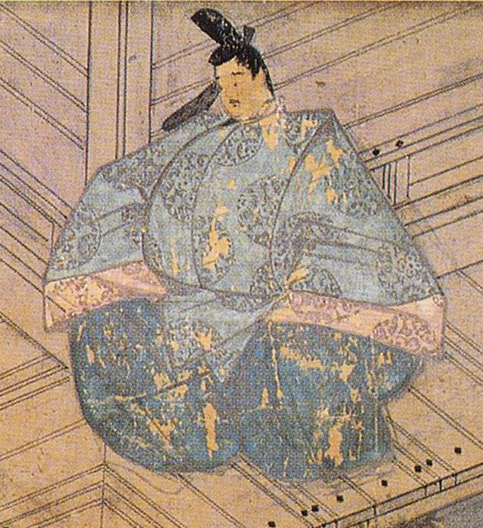
- Fujiwara no Michinaga depicted in the Murasaki Shikibu Nikki Emaki, c. 13th century

Daijō-daijin
- In office 24 December 1017 – 27 February 1018
- Monarch: Emperor Go-Ichijō
- Preceded by: Fujiwara no Tamemitsu
- Succeeded by: Fujiwara no Kinsue

Sesshō
- In office 10 March 1016 – 15 April 1017
- Monarch: Emperor Go-Ichijō
- Preceded by: Fujiwara no Michitaka
- Succeeded by: Fujiwara no Yorimichi

Sadaijin
- In office 6 August 996 – 7 January 1017
- Monarchs: Emperor Ichijō; Emperor Sanjō; Emperor Go-Ichijō
- Preceded by: Minamoto no Shigenobu
- Succeeded by: Fujiwara no Akimitsu

Udaijin
- In office 19 July 995 – 6 August 996
- Monarch: Emperor Ichijō
- Preceded by: Fujiwara no Michikane
- Succeeded by: Fujiwara no Akimitsu

Head of the Fujiwara clan
- In office 19 July 995 – 15 April 1017
- Preceded by: Fujiwara no Michikane
- Succeeded by: Fujiwara no Yorimichi

Personal details
- Born: 966
- Died: 3 January 1028 (aged 62)
- Children: Fujiwara no Shōshi (1st daughter); Fujiwara no Yorimichi (1st son); Fujiwara no Kenshi (2nd daughter); Fujiwara no Norimichi (5th son); Fujiwara no Ishi (4th daughter); Fujiwara no Kishi (6th daughter)
- Parents: Fujiwara no Kaneie (father); Fujiwara no Tokihime (mother)
- Relatives: Fujiwara no Michitaka (brother); Fujiwara no Michikane (brother); Fujiwara no Senshi (sister); Fujiwara no Korechika (nephew); Fujiwara no Teishi (niece); Princess Teishi (granddaughter); Emperor Ichijō (1st son-in-law); Emperor Sanjō (2nd son-in-law); Emperor Go-Ichijō (4th son-in-law); Emperor Go-Suzaku (6th son-in-law)

Fujiwara no Michinaga (藤原 道長; Japanese pronunciation: [ɸɯ̈̀.(ɟ̟͡)ʑí.β̞ä́.ɾä́ nó̞ | mʲì.c̟͡ɕí.nä̀.ɡä̀, -nó̞ mʲí-, -nä̀.ŋä̀, -nä́.ɡä́, -nä́.ŋä́]; 966 – 3 January 1028) was a Japanese statesman. The Fujiwara clan's control over Japan and its politics reached its zenith under his leadership.

== Early life ==
Michinaga was born in Kyōto, the son of Kaneie. Kaneie had become Regent in 986, holding the position until the end of his life in 990. Due to the hereditary principle of the Fujiwara Regents, Michinaga was now in line to become Regent after his brothers, Michitaka and Michikane.

== Career ==
=== Struggle with Korechika ===
Michitaka was regent from 990 until 995, when he died. Michikane then succeeded him, famously ruling as Regent for only seven days before he too died of disease. With his two elder brothers dead, Michinaga then struggled with Fujiwara no Korechika, Michitaka's eldest son and the successor he had named. The mother of Ichijō, Fujiwara no Senshi, coerced Ichijō into granting Michinaga the title of Nairan (内覧) in the fifth month of 995. Korechika's position was ruined by a scandal that took place the following year, likely arranged by Michinaga.

Korechika had been seeing a mistress in one of the Fujiwara palaces. He was told that the retired Emperor Kazan had been visiting the same house during the night; Korechika presumed that Kazan had been seeing the same mistress. Consequently, he and his brother Takaie ambushed the Emperor, shooting at him. An arrow struck Kazan's sleeve. Michinaga and his supporters then pressed charges of lèse-majesté. Though the jurists examining the case found the servants of Kaneie and Takaie at fault. Korechika was accused of putting a curse on Senshi.

During their struggle, Michinaga had gained the position of Minister of the Right, or Udaijin (右大臣), on the 19th day of the 6th month of 995. Later, in 996, Michinaga became Minister of the Left, Sadaijin (左大臣), the most senior position in government apart from that of Chancellor (Daijō-daijin).

=== Rule as Mido Kampaku ===
During his lifetime, Michinaga was called the Mido Kampaku, a title referencing the name of his residence, Mido, and that he was Regent in all but name. Although Ichijō already had an Empress, Teishi, Michinaga made her Kogo empress and had his first daughter, Shoshi, also marry him as Chūgū empress. When Teishi died of childbirth in 1001, Michinaga's influence over Ichijō was absolute. Kenshi, Michinaga's second daughter, married the future Emperor Sanjō. Ichijō and Shoshi had two sons, both future emperors, and it was to these that Michinaga's third and fourth daughters were married: Ichijō's eldest son, Go-Ichijō, married the third daughter, Ishi; and Ichijō's second son, Go-Suzaku, married the fourth daughter, Kishi.

Michinaga made alliances with the Minamoto (or more specifically, the Seiwa Genji); his wives were both Minamoto. Minamoto no Yorimitsu and Minamoto no Yorinobu were his two principal commanders. Michinaga never formally took the title of Kampaku. In 1011, he was granted the privilege of travelling to and from the court by ox-drawn cart. In the same year, Ichijō's second son, Atsunari, was proclaimed Crown Prince.

During Sanjō's reign as Emperor, he and Michinaga often came into conflict. Consequently, Michinaga attempted to pressure Sanjō into retirement. In 1016, he was successful. The youth of Go-Ichijō meant that Michinaga ruled as Sesshō, the Regency assumed. He briefly became Chancellor in the final month of 1017 before resigning in the second month of the following year. A month after his resignation, he also resigned from the position of Sesshō in favour of Yorimichi, his eldest son. In 1019, he took the tonsure, becoming a monk at the Hōjō-ji, which he had built. He took the Dharma name Gyōkan (行観), which was later changed to Gyōkaku (行覚).

== Death and legacy ==
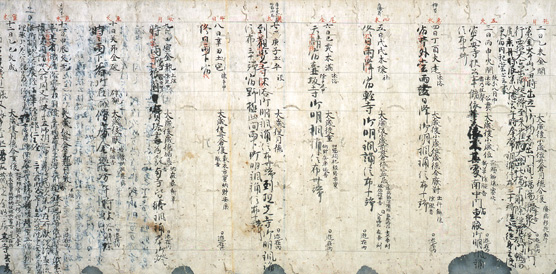
Segment of Michinaga's personal diary in his own handwriting—text shown is from volume covering the years from 998 to 1021, designated as National Treasure of Japan in the category ancient documents.

On 3 January 1028, Michinaga died at the age of sixty-two. He is said to have called out to Amida on his deathbed, asking for entry to Paradise. He left a diary, the Midō Kanpakuki, which is about the Heian court at the height of Fujiwara power. In the Tale of Genji, the eponymous Genji is believed to be in part based on Michinaga as well as Korechika.

== Genealogy ==
He was married to Minamoto no Rinshi, otherwise known as Michiko (源倫子), daughter of Sadaijin Minamoto no Masanobu. They had six children.

- Shōshi (彰子) (Jōtōmon-in, 上東門院) (988–1074) – consort of Emperor Ichijō.
- Yorimichi (頼通) (992–1074) – regent for Emperor Go-Ichijō, Emperor Go-Suzaku, and Emperor Go-Reizei.
- Kenshi (妍子) (994–1027) – consort of Emperor Sanjō.
- Norimichi (教通) (996–1075) – regent for Emperor Go-Sanjō and Emperor Shirakawa.
- Ishi (威子) (999–1036) – consort of Emperor Go-Ichijō.
- Kishi (嬉子) (1007–1025) – consort of Crown Prince Atsunaga (later Emperor Go-Suzaku).

He was also married to Minamoto no Meishi (源明子), daughter of Sadaijin Minamoto no Takaakira. They had six children.

- Yorimune (頼宗) (993–1065) – Udaijin.
- Akinobu (顕信) (994–1027) – He became a priest at the age of 19.
- Yoshinobu (能信) (995–1065) – Gon-no-Dainagon.
- Kanshi (寛子) (999–1025) – consort of Imperial Prince Atsuakira (Ko-Ichijō-in).
- Takako (尊子) (1003?–1087?) – married to Minamoto no Morofusa.
- Nagaie (長家) (1005–1064) – Gon-no-Dainagon.

Michinaga had one daughter from an unknown woman.

- Seishi (盛子) (?–?) – married to Emperor Sanjō.

== Bibliography ==
- Brown, Delmer M. and Ichirō Ishida, eds. (1979). Gukanshō: The Future and the Past. Berkeley: University of California Press. ISBN 978-0-520-03460-0; OCLC 251325323
- Hioki, S. (1990). Nihon Keifu Sōran. Kodansya. (in Japanese)
- Kasai, M. (1991). Kugyō Bunin Nenpyō. Yamakawa Shuppan-sha. (in Japanese)
- Owada, T. et al. (2003). Nihonshi Shoka Keizu Jimmei Jiten. Kodansya. (in Japanese)
- Ponsonby-Fane, Richard Arthur Brabazon. (1959). The Imperial House of Japan. Kyoto: Ponsonby Memorial Society. OCLC 194887
- Titsingh, Isaac. (1834). Nihon Odai Ichiran; ou, Annales des empereurs du Japon. Paris: Royal Asiatic Society, Oriental Translation Fund of Great Britain and Ireland. OCLC 5850691
- Tsuchida, N. (1973). Nihon no Rekishi No.5. Chūō Kōron Sha.
- Varley, H. Paul. (1980). Jinnō Shōtōki: A Chronicle of Gods and Sovereigns. New York: Columbia University Press. ISBN 978-0-231-04940-5; OCLC 59145842
- Sansom, George (1958). A History of Japan to 1334. Stanford University Press. ISBN 978-0804705233.
