= Takahiro =

- Pronunciation: Ta-ká-hí-ró
- Gender: Male

Origin
- Origin: Japanese
- Meaning: It can have many different meanings depending on the kanji used.
- Region of origin: Japan

Other names
- Related names: Takahito; Takayuki; Takaaki; Takafumi

Takahiro (たかひろ, タカヒロ) is a common masculine Japanese given name.

== Written forms ==
Takahiro can be written using different kanji characters and can mean:

- 高広, "high, broad"
- 隆弘, "noble, vast"
- 隆宏, "noble, wide"
- 隆博, "noble, gain"
- 孝広, "filial piety, broad"
- 貴大, "precious, big"
- 貴弘, "precious, vast"
- 貴裕, "precious, abundant"
- 貴洋, "precious, ocean"
- 尭弘, "high, vast"

The name can also be written in hiragana or katakana.

== People with the name ==
- Takahiro (敬浩), a vocalist of the Japanese pop music band EXILE
- Takahiro Aoh (隆寛), a Japanese professional boxer
- Takahiro Arai (貴浩), a Japanese professional baseball player
- Takahiro Endo (遠藤 孝弘; born 1968), Japanese footballer
- Takahiro Fujimoto (隆宏), a Japanese medley swimmer
- Takahiro Fujioka (藤岡 貴裕; born 1989), Japanese baseball player
- Takahiro Hōjō (隆博), a Japanese actor and musician
- Takahiro Itō (伊藤 隆大; 1987–2009), Japanese actor and voice actor
- Takahiro Izutani (タカヒロ), a Japanese composer of video game music and guitarist
- Takahiro Kasuganishiki (孝嘉), a Japanese sumo wrestler
- Takahiro Kimura (貴宏), a Japanese animator, illustrator, and character designer
- Takahiro Ko (宇洋, born 1998), Japanese footballer
- Takahiro Konagawa (高弘), a Japanese guitarist, singer, and musical composer
- Takahiro Mahara (孝浩), a Japanese pitcher
- Takahiro Matsumae (崇広), a Japanese daimyō of the Edo period
- Takahiro "Tak" Matsumoto (孝弘) a guitarist of the Japanese rock band B'z
- Takahiro Mazuka (馬塚 貴弘; born 1976), Japanese sprinter
- Takahiro Mizushima (大宙), a Japanese voice actor
- Takahiro Miyashita (隆宏), a former member of the Japanese rock band Anzen Chitai
- Takahiro Mori (隆弘), a Japanese medley swimmer
- Takahiro Moriuchi (貴寛), a vocalist of the Japanese rock band One Ok Rock
- Takahiro Nishijima (隆弘), a member of the J-pop group AAA
- Takahiro Nishikawa (隆宏), a former member of the J-pop band Dreams Come True
- Takahiro Ōhashi, Japanese shogi player
- Takahiro Ohata (大畑 孝広; born 1957), Japanese handball player
- Takahiro Sakurai (孝宏, born 1974), a Japanese voice actor
- Takahiro Sasaki (born 1949), Japanese politician
- Takahiro Satō (佐藤 タカヒロ; 1977–2018), Japanese manga artist
- Takahiro Shikine (敷根 崇裕; born 1997), Japanese fencer
- Takahiro Shiraishi (白石 隆浩; born 1990), Japanese convicted serial killer. He was dubbed the "Twitter killer" in media
- Takahiro Shimoyama (下山 貴裕; born 1992), Japanese basketball player
- Takahiro Shoda, (隆弘), a Japanese baseball player
- Takahiro Sunada (貴裕), a Japanese marathon runner
- Takahiro Suwa (高広), a Japanese professional wrestler
- Takahiro Taguchi (田口 貴寛; born 1957), Japanese footballer
- Takahiro Tanaka (disambiguation), multiple people
- Takahiro Toyokawa, Japanese shogi player
- Takahiro Ueda (上田 岳弘), Japanese writer
- Takahiro Ueno (高広), a Japanese professional drifting driver
- Takahiro Watanabe (渡辺 高博; born 1970), Japanese sprinter
- Takahiro Yamada (disambiguation), multiple people
- Takahiro Yamaguchi (山口 貴弘; born 1984), Japanese footballer
- Takahiro Yamamoto (隆弘), a Japanese volleyball player
- Takahiro Yodogawa (淀川 隆博; born 1951), Japanese footballer
- Takahiro Yokomichi (横路 孝弘; born 1941), Japanese politician
- Takahiro Yoshikawa (吉川 隆弘), Japanese classical pianist

== Fictional characters ==
- Takahiro Hanamaki (花巻 貴大), a character from Haikyu!! with the position of wing spiker from Aoba Johsai High
- Takahiro (隆弘), a character from the novel I Want to Eat Your Pancreas and its adaptations
