= List of magical girl works =

Magical girl (魔法少女, mahō shōjo) is a subgenre of Japanese fantasy media centered around young girls who use magic, often through an alter ego of an ideal version of themselves into which they can transform. Since the genre's emergence in the 1960s, media including anime, manga, OVAs, ONAs, films, and live-action series have been produced.

== Japan ==
Title	Year	Creator(s)	Original medium	Adaptation(s)	Ref(s)
Acro Trip	2017	Yone Sawata	Manga	Anime television series	
Akazukin Chacha	1991	Min Ayahana	Manga	Anime television series, OVA	
Alice & Zoroku	2012	Tetsuya Imai	Manga	Anime television series	
Ask Dr. Rin!	1999	Kiyoko Arai	Manga	Anime television series	
Assault Lily	2020	Min Ayahana	Light novel	Manga, Anime television series, ONA	
Bludgeoning Angel Dokuro-chan	2003	Masaki Okayu	Light novel	Manga, OVA, video game	
Blue Reflection Ray	2017	Koei Tecmo Games	Video game	Anime television series	
Butt Attack Punisher Girl Gautaman	1994	Masakazu Yamaguchi	Manga	OVA	
Cardcaptor Sakura	1996	Clamp	Manga	Anime television series, anime films	
Cardcaptor Sakura: Clear Card	2018	Clamp	Manga	OVA, Anime television series	
Codename: Sailor V	1991	Naoko Takeuchi	Manga	—N/a	
Come to the Magical Girl Village [Squatting]	2023	Gingham	Web manga	Anime	
Corrector Yui	1999	Kia Asamiya	Anime television series	Manga	
Cosmic Baton Girl Comet-san	2001	Mitsuteru Yokoyama	Anime television series	—N/a	
Creamy Mami, the Magic Angel	1983	Studio Pierrot	Anime television series	Manga, OVA	
Cute High Earth Defense Club Eternal Love!	2015	Natsuko Takahashi, Yumiko Hara	Light novel	Manga, anime	
Cutie Honey	1973	Go Nagai	Anime television series	Manga, anime film	
Cutie Honey Flash	1997	Go Nagai	Anime television series	Manga, anime film	
Day Break Illusion	2013	Haruyasu Akagi & Hidenori Tanaka	Anime television series	Light novels, manga	
Delicious Party Pretty Cure	2022	Izumi Todo	Anime television series	manga, anime film	
The Demon Girl Next Door	2014	Jun Inagawa	Manga	Anime television series	
DokiDoki! PreCure	2013	Izumi Todo	Anime television series	Manga, anime film	
Fairy Musketeers	2005	Shōgo Kumasaka	OVA	Anime television series	
Fancy Lala	1998	Studio Pierrot	Anime television series	Manga	
Fate/kaleid liner Prisma Illya	2013	Hiroshi Hiroyama	Manga	Anime television series, video games	
Flip Flappers	2016	Kiyotaka Oshiyama	Anime television series	—N/a	
Flower Witch Mary Bell	1992	Ashi Productions	Anime television series	Anime film	
Flying Witch	2012	Chihiro Ishizuka	Manga	Anime television series	
Fresh Pretty Cure!	2009	Izumi Todo	Anime television series	Manga, anime film	
Full Moon o Sagashite	2002	Arina Tanemura	Manga	Anime television series, OVA	
Fushigi Mahō Fun Fun Pharmacy!	1998	Toei Animation	Anime television series	—N/a	
Futari wa Pretty Cure	2004	Izumi Todo	Anime television series	Manga, anime film	
Futari wa Pretty Cure Splash Star	2006	Izumi Todo	Anime television series	Manga, anime film	
Go! Princess PreCure	2015	Izumi Todo	Anime television series	Manga, anime film	
Granbelm	2019	Nexus	Anime television series	—N/a	
Gushing over Magical Girls	2019	Akihiro Ononaka	Manga	Anime television series	
Hana no Ko Lunlun	1979	Toei Animation	Anime television series	Anime film	
Happiness Charge PreCure!	2014	Izumi Todo	Anime television series	Manga, anime film	
Healin' Good Pretty Cure	2020	Izumi Todo	Anime television series	Manga, anime film	
HeartCatch PreCure!	2010	Izumi Todo	Anime television series	Manga, anime film	
Hime Chen! Otogi Chikku Idol Lilpri	2009	Sega Sammy Holdings	Arcade game	Anime television series, manga	
Himitsu no Akko-chan	1962	Fujio Akatsuka	Manga	Anime television series, anime films, live-action film	
Hugtto! PreCure	2018	Izumi Todo	Anime television series	Manga, anime film	
Idol × Warrior Miracle Tunes!	2017	Takara Tomy & OLM	Live-action television series	Manga, light novel, video game	
Is This a Zombie?	2009	Shinichi Kimura	Light novel	Manga, anime television series	
Jewelpet: Magical Change	2015	Sanrio	Anime television series	—N/a	
Kamichama Karin	2003	Koge-Donbo	Manga	Anime television series	
Kiki's Delivery Service	1985	Eiko Kadono	Novel	Anime film, Live-action film	
Kirakira Pretty Cure a la Mode	2017	Izumi Todo	Anime television series	Manga, anime film	
La Belle Fille Masquée Poitrine	1990	Shotaro Ishinomori	Live-action television series	—N/a	
Lady Jewelpet	2014	Sanrio	Anime television series	Manga	
Lalabel, the Magical Girl	1980	Toei Animation	Anime television series	Anime television film	
Lapis Re:Lights	2020	Hajime Asano	Anime television series	Manga	
Little Witch Academia	2013	Yoh Yoshinari	Anime film	Anime television series, manga, video games	
Machimaho	2016	Souryu	Manga	—N/a	
Magic Knight Rayearth	1993	Clamp	Manga	Anime television series	
Magic User's Club	2002	Triangle Staff & Junichi Sato	OVA	Anime television series, manga, light novels	
Magical Angel Sweet Mint	1990	Ashi Productions	Anime television series	—N/a	
Magical Chinese Girl Paipai!	1989	Toei Company	Live-action television series	—N/a	
Magical Destroyers	2023	Jun Inagawa	Anime television series	—N/a	
Magical Emi, the Magic Star	1985	Studio Pierrot	Anime television series	Manga, OVA	
Magical Girl Apocalypse	2012	Kentarō Satō	Manga	—N/a	
Magical Girl Dandelion	2024-	Kaeru Mizuho	Manga	—N/a	
The Magical Girl and the Evil Lieutenant Used to Be Archenemies	2024-	Cocoa Fujiwara	Manga	Anime television series	
Magical Girl Lyrical Nanoha	2004	Masaki Tsuzuki & Seven Arcs	Anime television series	Manga, light novels	
Magical Girl Ore	2012	Icchokusen Mōkon	Manga	Anime television series	
Magical Girl Pretty Sammy	1995	AIC & Pioneer LDC	OVA	—N/a	
Magical Girl Raising Project	2012	Asari Endō	Light novels	Manga, anime television series	
Magical Girl Site	2013	Kentarō Satō	Manga	Anime television series	
Magical Girl Spec-Ops Asuka	2015	Makoto Fukami & Seigo Tokiya	Manga	Anime television series	
Magical × Heroine Magimajo Pures!	2018	Takara Tomy & OLM	Live-action television series	Manga	
Magical Kanan	1998	Terios	Visual novel	OVA, anime television series	
Magical Play	2001	Hiroki Hayashi & Hiroshi Ōnogi	ONA	OVA	
Magical Princess Minky Momo	1982	Takeshi Shudo	Anime television series	OVA, manga	
Magical Project S (Pretty Sammy)	1996	AIC & Pioneer LDC	Anime television series	—N/a	
Magical Sisters LuluttoLilly	2026	Studio Pierrot	Anime television series	—N/a	
Magilumiere Co. Ltd.	2021	Sekka Iwata & Yu Aoki	Manga	Anime television series	
Mahō no Mako-chan	1970	Toei Animation	Anime television series	—N/a	
Mahou Shoujo Nante Mouiidesukara	2015	Sui Futami	Manga	Anime television series	
Mahōtsukai Chappy	1972	Toei Animation	Anime television series	—N/a	
Majokko Megu-chan	1974	Tomō Inoue & Makiho Narita	Anime television series	—N/a	
Majokko Tickle	1978	Go Nagai	Anime television series	Manga	
Mami the Psychic	1977	Fujiko F. Fujio	Manga	Anime television series	
Märchen Mädchen	2017	Tomohiro Matsu	Light novel	Manga, anime television series	
Marvelous Melmo	1970	Osamu Tezuka	Manga	Anime television series	
Mermaid Melody Pichi Pichi Pitch	2003	Pink Hanamori	Manga	Anime television series	
Miracle Girl Limit-chan	1973	Toei Animation	Anime television series	—N/a	
Moegaku 5	2007	Studio Sagittarius	Video game	Anime television series	
Moetan	2007	Bandai Visual, Planet Entertainment, Actas, & Hakuhodo DY Media Partners	Reference books	Anime television series	
My-HiME	2004	Hajime Yatate	Anime television series	Manga, OVA, Video game	
Mysterious Thief Saint Tail	1995	Megumi Tachikawa	Manga	Anime television series	
Nanatsuiro Drops	2006	Unisonshift	Video game	Light novels, manga, anime television series	
New Cutie Honey	1994	Go Nagai	Anime television series	—N/a	
Ojamajo Doremi	1999	Izumi Todo	Anime television series	Manga, anime films, OVA, light novels	
Panty & Stocking with Garterbelt	2011	Gainax	Anime television series	Manga	
Pastel Yumi, the Magic Idol	1986	Studio Pierrot	Anime television series	Manga	
Penguindrum	2011	Kunihiko Ikuhara	Anime television series	Manga, anime films	
Persia, the Magic Fairy	1984	Studio Pierrot	Anime television series	Manga, OVA	
Petite Princess Yucie	2002	Gainax	Anime television series	Manga	
Phantom Thief Jeanne	1998	Arina Tanemura	Manga	Anime television series, light novels	
Police × Heroine Lovepatrina!	2020	Takara Tomy & OLM	Live-action television series	Manga, live-action film	
Power of Hope: PreCure Full Bloom	2023	Izumi Todo	Anime television series	—N/a	
Powerpuff Girls Z	2006	Toei Animation	Anime television series	Manga	
Prétear	2000	Junichi Sato & Kaori Naruse	Manga	Anime television series	
Pretty Rhythm: Aurora Dream	2011	Syn Sophia & Takara Tomy	Arcade game	Anime television series, manga	
Princess Comet	1967	Mitsuteru Yokoyama	Manga	Live-action television series	
Princess Tutu	2002	Ikuko Itoh	Anime television series	Manga	
Princession Orchestra	2025	Akifumi Kaneko, Noriyasu Agematsu, Manta Aisora, Shin Oonuma	Anime	—N/a	
Puella Magi Madoka Magica	2011	Magica Quartet	Anime television series	Manga, anime films	
Re:Creators	2017	Rei Hiroe	Anime television series	—N/a	
Revolutionary Girl Utena	1996	Be-Papas	Manga	Anime television series, anime film	
Rilu Rilu Fairilu	2016	Sanrio & Sega Sammy Holdings	Anime television series	—N/a	
Sailor Moon	1991	Naoko Takeuchi	Manga	Anime television series, anime films, live-action television series	
Sailor Moon Crystal	2014	Naoko Takeuchi	Manga	ONA, Anime television series	
Saint October	2007	Konami Digital Entertainment	Anime television series	Manga	
Saint Seiya: Saintia Shō	2013	Masami Kurumada	Manga	ONA	
Sally the Witch	1966	Mitsuteru Yokoyama	Manga	Anime television series	
Sarutobi Ecchan	1964	Shotaro Ishinomori	Manga	Anime television series	
Sasami: Magical Girls Club	2006	AIC & BeSTACK	Manga	Anime television series	
Secret × Heroine Phantomirage!	2019	Takara Tomy & OLM	Live-action television series	Manga, live-action film	
Shakugan no Shana	2002	Yashichiro Takahashi	Light novel	Anime television series	
Shugo Chara!	2005	Peach-Pit	Manga	Anime television series	
Smile Pretty Cure!	2012	Izumi Todo	Anime television series	Manga, anime film	
Soaring Sky! Pretty Cure	2023	Izumi Todo	Anime television series	Manga, Film	
Star Detective Precure!	2026	Izumi Todo	Anime television series		
Star Twinkle Precure	2019	Izumi Todo	Anime television series	Manga, anime film	
Sugar Sugar Rune	2004	Moyoco Anno	Manga	Anime television series	
Suite Pretty Cure	2011	Izumi Todo	Anime television series	Manga, anime film	
Super Doll Licca-chan	1998	Takara Tomy	Anime television series	Manga, anime film	
Symphogear	2012	Akifumi Kaneko & Noriyasu Agematsu	Anime television series	Manga	
Time Stranger Kyoko	2000	Arina Tanemura	Manga	OVA	
Tokyo Mew Mew	2000	Reiko Yoshida & Mia Ikumi	Manga	Anime television series	
Tokyo Mew Mew New	2022	Reiko Yoshida & Mia Ikumi	Manga	Anime television series	
Tonde Burin	1994	Taeko Ikeda	Manga	Anime television series	
Tropical-Rouge! Pretty Cure	2021	Izumi Todo	Anime television series	Manga, anime films	
Tweeny Witches	2004	Keita Amemiya	Anime television series	OVA	
Twin Princess of Wonder Planet	2005	Birthday	Anime television series	Manga, video games	
Ultra Maniac	2003	Wataru Yoshizumi	Manga	Anime television series	
Waccha PriMagi!	2021	Hitsuji Tsujinaga	Manga	Video game, anime television series	
Wedding Peach	1994	Sukehiro Tomita & Nao Yazawa	Manga	Anime television series, OVA	
Wish Upon the Pleiades	2011	Gainax	Anime television series	—N/a	
Witchy PreCure!	2016	Izumi Todo	Anime television series	Manga, anime film	
Wonderful Pretty Cure!	2024–2025	Izumi Todo	Anime television series	Manga, Film	
Yadamon	1992	Group TAC	Anime television series	Video games	
Yes! PreCure 5	2007	Izumi Todo	Anime television series	Manga, anime film	
You and Idol Pretty Cure	2025-2026	Izumi Todo	Anime television series	Manga, Film	
Yuki Yuna Is a Hero	2014	Takahiro	Anime television series	Light novels, manga	
Yume no Crayon Oukoku	1998	Michiru Kataoka	Manga	Anime television series	
