= Tenkaihō Takayuki =

Japanese sumo wrestler

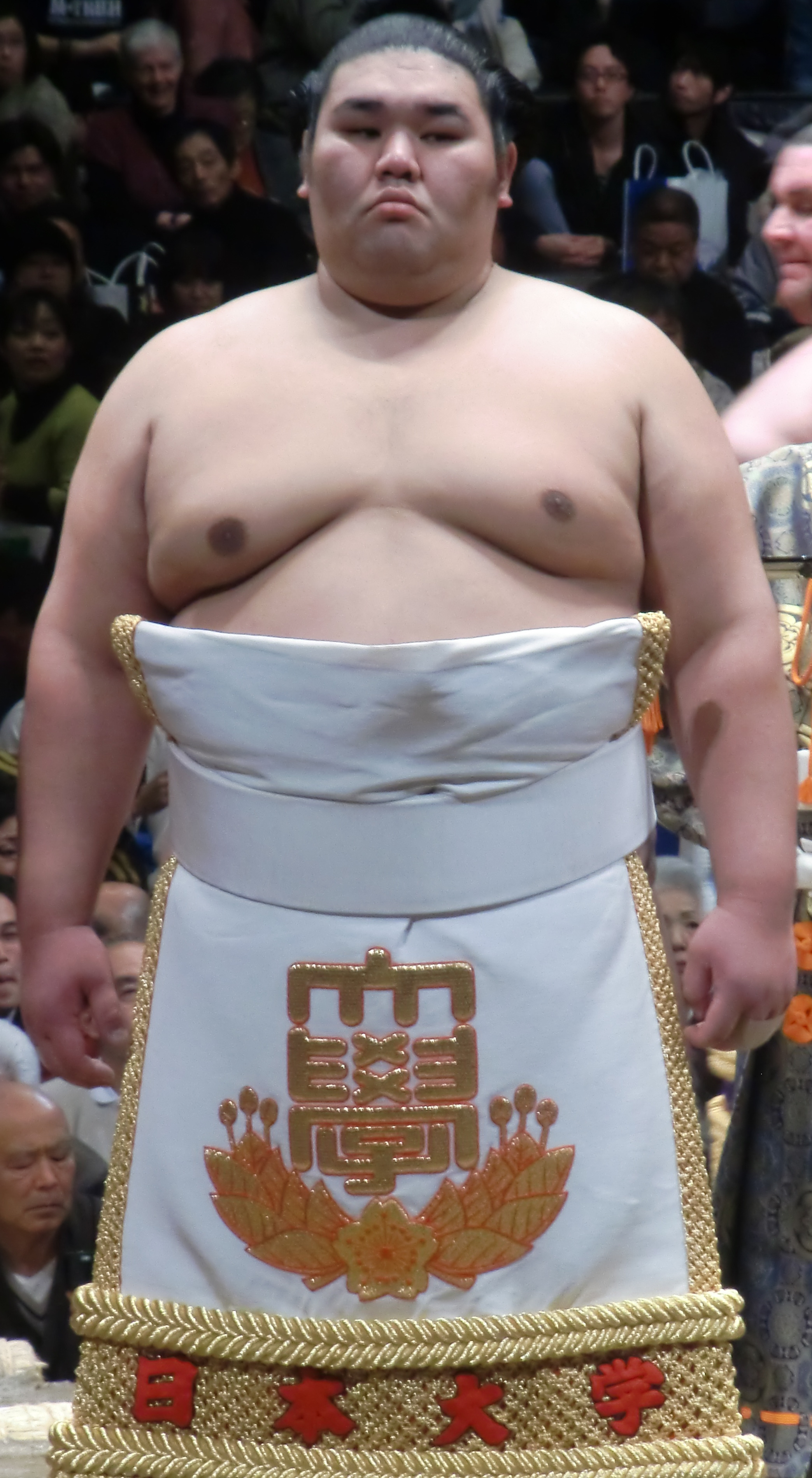

Personal information
- Native name: 天鎧鵬 貴由輝
- Born: Takayuki Minami; 14 October 1984 (age 42) Tamana, Kumamoto, Japan
- Height: 1.82 m (5 ft 11 1/2 in)
- Weight: 185 kg (408 lb)

Sport
- Sport: Sumo
- University team: Nihon University
- Retired: March, 2019
- Heya: Onoe
- Record: 367–365–4
- Debut: January, 2007
- Highest rank: Maegashira 8 (November, 2012)
- Elder name: Kitajin
- Championships: 1 (Sandanme)
- Updated on 21 July 2023

Tenkaihō Takayuki (born 14 October 1984 as Takayuki Minami) is a retired sumo wrestler from Tamana, Kumamoto, Japan. He made his professional debut in January 2007, and reached the top division in January 2012. His highest rank was maegashira 8. He won one sandanme championship. He retired in March 2019 to become a coach in the Japan Sumo Association, where he remained until his departure in October 2025.

== Early life and sumo background ==
Minami began sumo in only his first year of primary school. In middle school he was regular participant in tournaments and came in third place in a Kyūshū wide tournament. In his second year of high school he was in the best eight in a national sumo tournament, and in his third year made the best sixteen in the same national tournament. He continued practicing sumo at Nihon University and was a teammate of later sumo stars Yamamotoyama and Kiyoseumi. Upon graduation he chose to join Onoe stable which was led by former Hamanoshima who went to the same high school and university as Minami had. He also became stablemates with future ōzeki Baruto.

== Career ==
Minami started his professional career with a consistent string of successes, only losing a few bouts in his first several tournaments and winning the sandanme division championship from the low rank of sandanme 92 with a 7–0 record and a playoff win over veteran Kihonoumi. He rose slowly but consistently through the ranks, recording mostly winning records over the next three years. In the November 2010 tournament he had a breakout performance, losing only to future maegashira Yoshiazuma. In a playoff for the makushita division championship, he lost to future sekiwake Myōgiryū. He again continued to rise slowly but consistently through the ranks, achieving second division jūryō promotion for the July 2011 tournament. He was helped by there being a large number of retirements due to a match-fixing scandal. Upon promotion to the second division he took the ring name of Tenkaihō. It took him only three winning tournaments in the remainder of 2011 to gain promotion to the top division. After battling for three tournaments in the top tier makuuchi he was relegated back to the second division. He managed to be re-promoted three times after that, but was soon demoted again, and became more of a jūryō regular than a makuuchi performer. He was demoted to the makushita division after the May 2016 tournament, scoring only 4–11 at Jūryō 14. He competed in the upper makushita ranks until 2019 but was never able to secure another promotion.

== Retirement from sumo ==
Tenkaihō announced his retirement after the March 2019 tournament. He stayed in sumo as an elder of the Japan Sumo Association with the elder name Hidenoyama (borrowed from the active wrestler Kotoshogiku), and coaches at Onoe stable. In February 2020 he switched to the Otowayama elder name, and in January 2023 he changed to Sanoyama. Following the retirement of former maegashira Chiyonokuni, Tenkaihō changed his elder name from Sanoyama (inherited by Chiyonokuni) to Kitaijin, previously held by former sekiwake Kotoyūki.

In late October 2025, it was announced that Tenkaihō had retired as a coach and departed from the Japan Sumo Association. Soon after his departure, it was reported that he would be joining Abema's Grand Sumo Tournament coverage as a commentator.

== Fighting style ==
Tenkaihō was a yotsu-sumo wrestler who preferred grappling techniques to pushing and thrusting. His favoured grip on his opponent's mawashi or belt was migi-yotsu, a left hand outside, right hand inside position. His most common winning kimarite was a straightforward yori-kiri or force out, which accounted for about half of his career victories.

== Personal life ==
He registered his marriage in September 2015, to a care worker from Anjo, Aichi. Their wedding reception was held in June 2016.

== Career record ==
Tenkaihō Takayuki
Year	January Hatsu basho, Tokyo	March Haru basho, Osaka	May Natsu basho, Tokyo	July Nagoya basho, Nagoya	September Aki basho, Tokyo	November Kyūshū basho, Fukuoka
2007	(Maezumo)	West Jonokuchi #31; 6–1	West Jonidan #60; 6–1	East Sandanme #92; 7–0–P; Champion	East Makushita #59; 5–2	East Makushita #41; 5–2
2008	East Makushita #28; 6–1	East Makushita #12; 4–3	East Makushita #8; 5–2	West Makushita #5; 2–5	East Makushita #16; 3–4	East Makushita #23; 5–2
2009	West Makushita #13; 3–4	East Makushita #22; 4–3	West Makushita #17; 2–5	West Makushita #32; 4–3	East Makushita #26; 4–3	West Makushita #20; 5–2
2010	West Makushita #16; 2–5	East Makushita #28; 5–2	East Makushita #18; 3–4	East Makushita #29; 4–3	East Makushita #22; 5–2	East Makushita #11; 6–1–P
2011	West Makushita #1; 3–4	Tournament Cancelled; 0–0–0	East Makushita #6; 4–3	West Jūryō #10; 10–5	West Jūryō #3; 8–7	East Jūryō #1; 8–7
2012	West Maegashira #13; 8–7	West Maegashira #11; 6–9	East Maegashira #13; 5–10	East Jūryō #2; 9–6	West Maegashira #13; 6–9	East Jūryō #1; 5–10
2013	East Jūryō #6; 8–7	West Jūryō #5; 7–8	West Jūryō #6; 8–7	West Jūryō #5; 10–5	East Maegashira #12; 8–7	West Maegashira #8; 2–13
2014	East Jūryō #2; 8–7	East Maegashira #15; 3–8–4	West Jūryō #6; 6–9	West Jūryō #10; 5–10	East Makushita #1; 4–3	East Jūryō #13; 10–5
2015	East Jūryō #7; 7–8	East Jūryō #8; 10–5	East Jūryō #2; 5–10	West Jūryō #6; 7–8	East Jūryō #7; 5–10	East Jūryō #13; 9–6
2016	East Jūryō #7; 5–10	East Jūryō #11; 6–9	East Jūryō #14; 4–11	West Makushita #6; 3–4	East Makushita #12; 3–4	East Makushita #18; 4–3
2017	West Makushita #12; 2–5	East Makushita #25; 2–5	East Makushita #41; 5–2	West Makushita #29; 4–3	West Makushita #21; 4–3	West Makushita #17; 4–3
2018	East Makushita #14; 5–2	West Makushita #4; 3–4	East Makushita #8; 2–5	West Makushita #22; 5–2	West Makushita #11; 3–4	West Makushita #19; 3–4
2019	East Makushita #29; 1–6	West Makushita #52; Retired; 4–3	x	x	x	x
Record given as wins–losses–absences Top division champion Top division runner-up Retired Lower divisions Non-participation Sanshō key: F=Fighting spirit; O=Outstanding performance; T=Technique Also shown: ★=Kinboshi; P=Playoff(s); Divisions: Makuuchi — Jūryō — Makushita — Sandanme — Jonidan — Jonokuchi Makuuchi ranks: Yokozuna — Ōzeki — Sekiwake — Komusubi — Maegashira

== See also ==
- Glossary of sumo terms
- List of past sumo wrestlers
- List of sumo elders
