= Yodogawa =

Yodogawa (written: 淀川) is a Japanese surname. Notable people with the surname include:

- Nagaharu Yodogawa (淀川 長治, 1909–1998), Japanese film critic and television personality
- Takahiro Yodogawa (淀川 隆博, born 1951), Japanese footballer

== See also ==
- Yodogawa-ku, Osaka, Japan
- The Yodo River in Japan
