= Satoyama Kōsaku =

Japanese sumo wrestler

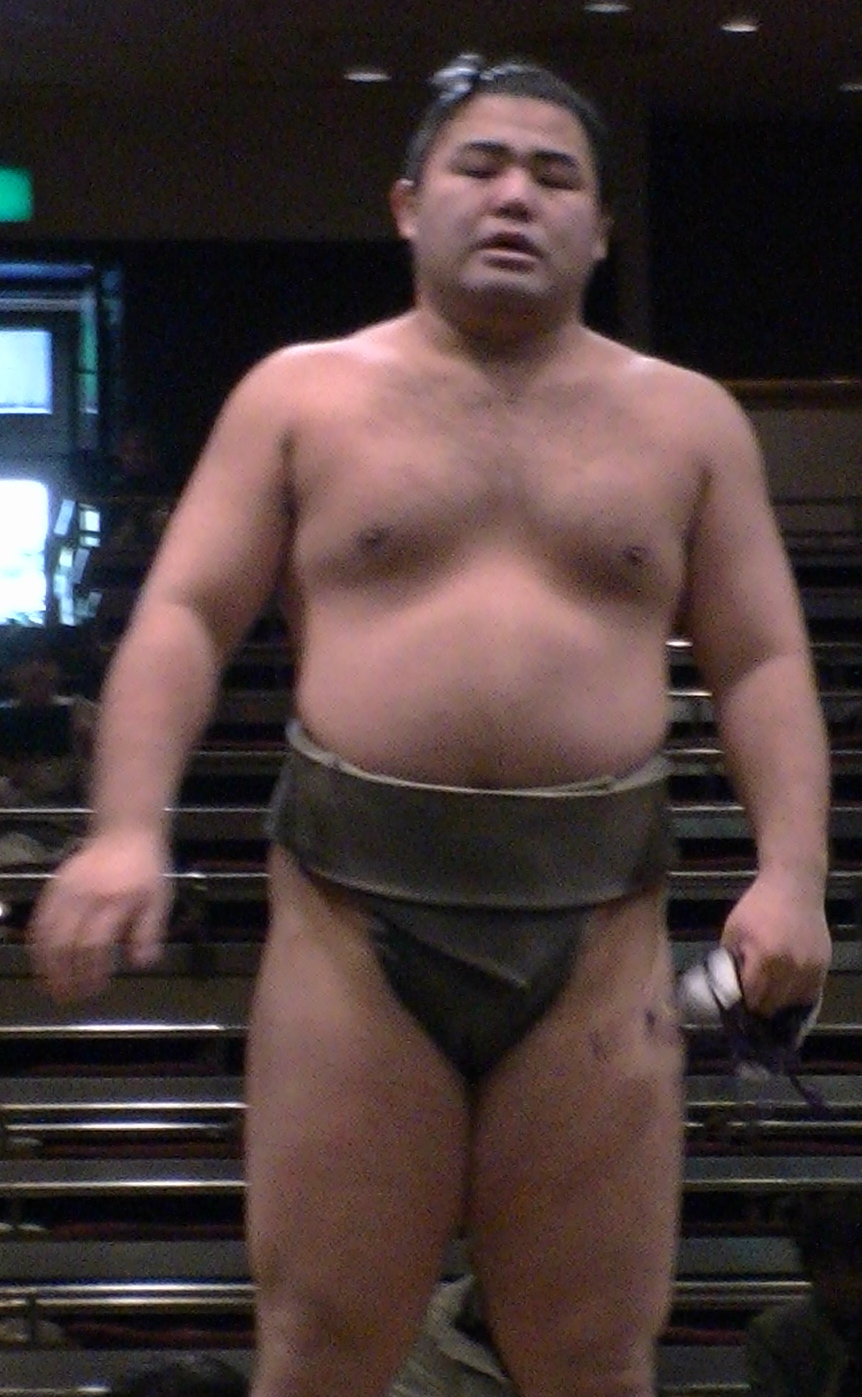

Personal information
- Native name: 里山 浩作
- Born: Kōsaku Satoyama; May 31, 1981 (age 45) Kagoshima, Japan
- Height: 1.76 m (5 ft 9 1/2 in)
- Weight: 119 kg (262 lb)

Sport
- Sport: Sumo
- University team: Nihon University
- Retired: November, 2018
- Heya: Onoe, formerly Mihogaseki
- Record: 493-483-10
- Debut: March 2004
- Highest rank: Maegashira 12 (May 2007)
- Elder name: Chiganoura
- Championships: 1 (Jūryō); 1 (Makushita)
- Updated on April 20, 2021

Satoyama Kōsaku (born May 31, 1981) is a retired professional sumo wrestler from Ōshima, Kagoshima Prefecture, Japan. A former amateur sumo champion at Nihon University, he entered professional sumo in 2004 and first reached the top makuuchi division in 2007. His highest rank was maegashira 12. He spent much of his career in the jūryō and makushita divisions, and won a yusho or tournament championship in each. He won promotion back to the top division in 2014 after a seven-year and 37-tournament absence, the longest ever. He was a member of Onoe stable. He retired in November 2018 and is an elder of the Japan Sumo Association under the name of Chiganoura.

== Career ==
A former amateur sumo champion at Nihon University, Satoyama made his professional debut in March 2004, joining Mihogaseki stable alongside his team-mate at Nichidai Sumo Club, Shiraishi. He was attracted to the stable because of his admiration for Onoe Oyakata, (ex komusubi Hamanoshima), himself a former amateur champion. Initially he was somewhat overshadowed by Shiraishi and Baruto, who made their jūryō division debuts together in September 2005. However, Satoyama was still highly regarded, despite his short height and relatively light weight. He made his way quickly up the ranks, recording only one make-koshi along the way to sekitori status, which he achieved in January 2006 upon promotion to the jūryō division. In September 2006 Satoyama, Shiraishi, Baruto and a number of other wrestlers scouted by Onoe Oyakata joined his newly created Onoe stable.

In March 2007 Satoyama won the jūryō division championship or yūshō with a 12–3 record and he entered the top makuuchi division for the first time in May 2007 at maegashira 12, where he scored seven wins against eight losses. After a poor 2–13 record in July he was demoted back to jūryō. Restricted by a neck injury, he had two more losing scores in September and November 2007, pushing him towards the bottom of the second division. In January 2008 he won only two bouts in the first 11 days, and although he won his last four matches to finish on a 6–9 score, it was not enough to prevent demotion to the third makushita division.

Satoyama produced a 2–5 score in March 2008, and 3–4 in May, meaning he had chalked up seven consecutive losing scores. In July 2008 he returned to form and won the makushita championship with a 6–1 score after an eight-way playoff, defeating his 232 kg stablemate Yamamotoyama Ryūta in the final. It was his first kachi-koshi or winning score since his jūryō division championship in March 2007. However he could manage only two wins in each of his next two tournaments. Remaining firmly stuck in the makushita ranks, he became a tsukebito, or personal attendant, to Baruto. However, in the July 2011 basho he scored 5–2 at makushita 6 which returned him to jūryō for the first time in 21 tournaments. His score of 7–8 in September was enough to keep him in the second division, but not the 6–9 that followed in November. However he achieved his majority of wins against losses in the January 2012 basho, coming from 0–3 down to score 4–3, and this was enough to return him immediately to jūryō.

In the January 2014 tournament Satoyama returned to the top division for the first time since July 2007. The 37 tournament gap between appearances in makuuchi is the most in sumo history, breaking the record of 28 tournaments held by Wakanoyama. However, he only lasted two tournaments before being demoted. He was promoted to the top division in July 2015 and again in March 2016, but a kachi-koshi or majority of wins in a makuuchi tournament continued to elude him. Nevertheless, he maintained his sekitori status until September 2017, when he was demoted to makushita for the first time since 2012. For the next year he recorded solid results in the third division but was unable to gain promotion and he announced his retirement after a 4-3 result in November 2018.

== Retirement from sumo ==
Satoyama retired after the November 2018 tournament. He has stayed with the Japan Sumo Association as a coach at his stable initially under the borrowed elder name of Sanoyama Oyakata (owned by Chiyootori). His danpatsu-shiki, or official retirement ceremony, was held on 29 September 2019 at the Ryōgoku Kokugikan, on the same day as Kisenosato's. In April 2021 he acquired the Chiganoura name.

== Fighting style ==
At 1.76 m (5 ft 9 1/2 in) and 119 kg (262 lb) Satoyama was one of the smallest sekitori and had to rely on technical skill to defeat his heavier opponents. According to his Japan Sumo Association profile Satoyama favoured yotsu-sumo, fighting on the mawashi or belt. His preferred grip was listed as hidari-yotsu, with his right hand outside and left hand inside his opponent's arms. He is known for his underarm throw, or shitatenage. However, his most common winning kimarite was actually oshi-dashi, or push out.

== Personal life ==
Satoyama was married in September 2012 and the wedding reception was held the following February, with Kitanoumi and Hakuho among the 500 guests. His wife also has an amateur sumo background, and is a former winner of the Women's Asian Championships.

== Career record ==
Satoyama Kōsaku
Year	January Hatsu basho, Tokyo	March Haru basho, Osaka	May Natsu basho, Tokyo	July Nagoya basho, Nagoya	September Aki basho, Tokyo	November Kyūshū basho, Fukuoka
2004	x	(Maezumo)	West Jonokuchi #10; 5–0–2	West Jonidan #92; 6–1	East Jonidan #15; 7–0–P	East Sandanme #21; 6–1
2005	West Makushita #41; 3–4	West Makushita #54; 5–2	East Makushita #40; 5–2	East Makushita #23; 5–2	West Makushita #12; 6–1	East Makushita #4; 5–2
2006	West Jūryō #13; 9–6	West Jūryō #8; 9–6	East Jūryō #4; 7–8	West Jūryō #4; 9–6	East Jūryō #2; 6–9	West Jūryō #5; 8–6–1
2007	East Jūryō #3; 7–8	East Jūryō #4; 12–3; Champion	West Maegashira #12; 7–8	West Maegashira #12; 2–13	West Jūryō #5; 6–9	East Jūryō #9; 6–9
2008	East Jūryō #12; 6–9	West Makushita #1; 2–5	West Makushita #8; 3–4	East Makushita #14; 6–1–PPP; Champion	East Makushita #3; 2–5	West Makushita #9; 2–3–2
2009	East Makushita #25; 4–3	West Makushita #18; 5–2	East Makushita #11; 4–3	East Makushita #9; 2–5	East Makushita #22; 6–1	East Makushita #9; 2–5
2010	West Makushita #19; 3–4	East Makushita #26; 5–2	West Makushita #15; 2–5	West Makushita #30; 5–2	East Makushita #15; 3–4	East Makushita #19; 3–4
2011	East Makushita #24; 4–3	Tournament Cancelled; 0–0–0	West Makushita #20; 5–2	West Makushita #6; 5–2	East Jūryō #12; 7–8	West Jūryō #13; 6–9
2012	East Makushita #1; 4–3	East Jūryō #13; 8–7	East Jūryō #10; 4–11	West Makushita #2; 4–3	East Jūryō #13; 8–5–2	East Jūryō #11; 11–4
2013	West Jūryō #3; 4–11	East Jūryō #10; 9–6	East Jūryō #5; 5–10	West Jūryō #8; 8–7	East Jūryō #8; 8–7	East Jūryō #6; 10–5
2014	West Maegashira #16; 7–8	West Maegashira #16; 4–11	West Jūryō #5; 6–9	East Jūryō #9; 7–8	West Jūryō #9; 9–3–3	East Jūryō #3; 5–10
2015	West Jūryō #7; 5–10	West Jūryō #10; 11–4	East Jūryō #4; 9–6	West Maegashira #15; 5–10	West Jūryō #4; 7–8	East Jūryō #6; 7–8
2016	West Jūryō #6; 9–6	East Maegashira #15; 6–9	West Jūryō #1; 6–9	West Jūryō #4; 5–10	West Jūryō #9; 5–10	East Jūryō #14; 9–6
2017	West Jūryō #11; 8–7	East Jūryō #10; 7–8	West Jūryō #11; 7–8	East Jūryō #13; 3–12	East Makushita #7; 4–3	East Makushita #5; 2–6
2018	West Makushita #20; 4–3	West Makushita #14; 3–4	East Makushita #22; 5–2	East Makushita #14; 3–4	East Makushita #21; 5–2	West Makushita #9; Retired; 4–3
Record given as wins–losses–absences Top division champion Top division runner-up Retired Lower divisions Non-participation Sanshō key: F=Fighting spirit; O=Outstanding performance; T=Technique Also shown: ★=Kinboshi; P=Playoff(s); Divisions: Makuuchi — Jūryō — Makushita — Sandanme — Jonidan — Jonokuchi Makuuchi ranks: Yokozuna — Ōzeki — Sekiwake — Komusubi — Maegashira

== See also ==
- List of sumo tournament second division champions
- Glossary of sumo terms
- List of past sumo wrestlers
- List of sumo elders
