= Immortality and Punishment =

Japanese manga series

- First tankōbon volume cover

不死と罰 (Fushi to Batsu)
- Genre: Horror
- Manga
- Written by: Kentarō Satō
- Published by: Akita Shoten
- English publisher: NA: Yen Press
- Imprint: Shōnen Champion Comics
- Magazine: Bessatsu Shōnen Champion
- Original run: November 12, 2021 – March 12, 2025
- Volumes: 8

Immortality and Punishment (不死と罰, Fushi to Batsu) is a Japanese manga series written and illustrated by Kentarō Satō. It was serialized in Akita Shoten's shōnen manga magazine Bessatsu Shōnen Champion from November 2021 to March 2025.

== Synopsis ==
Fumito Yakaze is a young man with a dark secret who's struggling to find work and makes money via sugar dating. One day, he finds himself in a love hotel surrounded by zombies as an infection spreads across the city. As he prepares to accept his death, he remembers a voice telling him that he cannot die, because if he would die he wouldn't be able to atone for his crimes.

== Publication ==
Written and illustrated by Kentarō Satō, Immortality and Punishment was serialized in Akita Shoten's shōnen manga magazine Bessatsu Shōnen Champion from November 12, 2021, to March 12, 2025. Its chapters were collected in eight tankōbon volumes released from April 7, 2022, to June 6, 2025.

During their panel at Anime Expo 2025, Yen Press announced that they had licensed the series for English publication.

No.	Original release date	Original ISBN	North American release date	North American ISBN
1	April 7, 2022	978-4-253-29341-9	January 20, 2026	979-8-8554-1570-4
Chapters 1–4
2	August 8, 2022	978-4-253-29342-6	May 26, 2026	979-8-8554-1572-8
Chapters 5–8
3	February 8, 2023	978-4-253-29343-3	April 27, 2027	979-8-8554-1574-2
4	July 6, 2023	978-4-253-29344-0	—	—
5	December 7, 2023	978-4-253-29345-7	—	—
6	July 8, 2024	978-4-253-29346-4	—	—
7	January 8, 2025	978-4-253-29347-1	—	—
8	June 6, 2025	978-4-253-29348-8	—	—

== See also ==
- Magical Girl Apocalypse and Magical Girl Site, manga series by the same creator
