= Takayuki =

- Gender: Male

Origin
- Origin: Japanese
- Meaning: Different meanings depending on the kanji used

Takayuki (written: 孝之, 孝行, 孝幸, 隆之, 隆行, 隆幸, 高之, 高行, 高猷, 貴之, 貴幸, 貴由, 貴由輝, 崇之, 崇幸, 敬之, 卓行, 鷹幸, 恭之 or タカユキ in katakana) is a masculine Japanese given name. Notable people with the name include:

- Takayuki Aoki (青木 孝行; born 1972), Japanese racing driver
- Takayuki Arakaki (新垣 貴之; born 1996), Japanese footballer
- Takayuki Chano (茶野 隆行; born 1976), Japanese footballer
- Takayuki Fujikawa (藤川 孝幸; born 1962), Japanese footballer
- Takayuki Fukumura (福村 貴幸; born 1991), Japanese footballer
- Takayuki Funayama (船山 貴之; born 1987), Japanese footballer
- Takayuki Godai (五代 高之; born 1956), Japanese actor
- Takayuki Hamana (浜名 孝行; born 1967), Japanese anime director
- Takayuki Iizuka (飯塚 孝之; born 1966), Japanese professional wrestler
- Takayuki Inubushi (犬伏 孝行; born 1972), Japanese long-distance runner
- Jōkōryū Takayuki (常幸龍 貴之; born 1988), Japanese sumo wrestler
- Takayuki Kajitani (梶谷 隆幸; born 1988), Japanese baseball player
- Takayuki Kato (加藤 貴之; born 1992), Japanese baseball player
- Takayuki Kishi (岸 孝之; born 1984), Japanese baseball player
- Takayuki Kishimoto (岸本 鷹幸; born 1990), Japanese hurdler
- Takayuki Kiyooka (清岡 卓行; 1922–2006), Japanese poet and writer
- Kiyoseumi Takayuki (清瀬海 孝行; born 1984), Japanese sumo wrestler
- Takayuki Kobori (小堀 恭之; born 1969), Japanese ice hockey player
- Takayuki Komine (小峯 隆幸; born 1974), Japanese footballer
- Takayuki Kondō (近藤 孝行; born 1978), Japanese voice actor
- Takayuki Kubota (窪田 孝行; 1934–2024), Japanese karateka
- Takayuki Kuwata (桑田 隆幸; born 1941), Japanese footballer
- Takayuki Mae (前 貴之; born 1993), Japanese footballer
- Takayuki Masuda (増田 崇之), Japanese chief executive
- Takayuki Matsumiya (松宮 隆行; born 1980), Japanese long-distance runner
- Takayuki Mikami (三上 孝之; born 1933), Japanese karateka
- Minatofuji Takayuki (湊富士 孝行; born 1968), Japanese sumo wrestler
- Takayuki Miura (三浦 孝之; born 1967), Japanese ice hockey player
- Takayuki Miyauchi (宮内 タカユキ; born 1955), Japanese singer
- Takayuki Mori (森 隆行; born 1976), Japanese professional wrestler
- Takayuki Morimoto (森本 貴幸; born 1988), Japanese footballer
- Takayuki Nakahara (中原 貴之; born 1984), Japanese footballer
- Takayuki Nakamura (中村 隆之; born 1967), Japanese video game composer
- Takayuki Nishigaya (西ヶ谷 隆之; born 1973), Japanese footballer
- Takayuki Odajima (小田島 隆幸; born 1977), Japanese footballer
- Takayuki Ogawa (小川 隆之; 1938–2008), Japanese photographer
- Takayuki Ohira (大平 貴之; born 1970), Japanese engineer and inventor
- Takayuki Okazaki (岡崎 高之; born 1940), Japanese long jumper
- Takayuki Omi (近江 孝行; born 1982), Japanese footballer
- Takayuki Ono (尾野 貴之; born 1983), Japanese ice hockey player
- Takayuki Sakazume (坂詰 貴之; born 1972), Japanese actor
- Sasaki Takayuki (佐々木 高行; 1830–1910), Japanese samurai and politician
- Takayuki Sasada (貴之笹田; born 1979), Japanese voice actor
- Takayuki Seto (瀬戸 貴幸; born 1986), Japanese footballer
- Takayuki Shimizu (清水 隆行; born 1973), Japanese baseball player
- Takayuki Sugō (菅生 隆之; born 1952), Japanese voice actor
- Takayuki Suzuki (born 1973) (鈴木 敬之; born 1973), Japanese footballer
- Takayuki Suzuki (鈴木 隆行; born 1976), Japanese footballer
- Takayuki Suzuki (swimmer) (鈴木 孝幸), Japanese Paralympic swimmer
- Takayuki Tada (多田 高行; born 1988), Japanese footballer
- Takayuki Takabayashi (高林 孝行; born 1972), Japanese baseball player
- Takayuki Takaguchi (高口 隆行; born 1983), Japanese baseball player
- Takayuki Takayasu (高安 孝幸; born 2001), Japanese footballer
- Takayuki Tanii (谷井 孝行; born 1983), Japanese racewalker
- Takayuki Tatsumi (巽 孝之; born 1955), Japanese academic
- Tenkaihō Takayuki (天鎧鵬 貴由輝; born 1984), Japanese sumo wrestler
- Takayuki Terauchi (寺内 崇幸; born 1983), Japanese baseball player
- Tochiizumi Takayuki (栃泉 隆幸; born 1959), Japanese sumo wrestler
- Tōdō Takayuki (藤堂 高猷; 1813–1895), Japanese daimyō
- Takayuki Tsubaki (椿 隆之; born 1982), Japanese actor
- Takayuki Yamada (山田 孝之; born 1983), Japanese actor and singer
- Takayuki Yamaguchi (voice actor) (山口 隆行; born 1975), Japanese voice actor
- Takayuki Yamaguchi (artist) (山口 貴由; born 1966), Japanese manga artist
- Takayuki Yamaguchi (footballer) (山口 貴之; born 1973), Japanese footballer
- Takayuki Yamasaki (山崎 隆之; born 1981), Japanese shogi player
- Takayuki Yokoyama (横山 貴之; born 1972), Japanese footballer
- Takayuki Yoshida (吉田 孝行; born 1977), Japanese footballer
- Takayuki Yumira (弓良 隆行; born 1980), Japanese equestrian

== Fictional characters ==
- Takayuki Nekoyashiki (猫屋敷貴行), a supporting character in Wonderful Pretty Cure!

== See also ==
- 8294 Takayuki, a main-belt asteroid
