= Hamanoshima Keishi =

Japanese sumo wrestler (born 1970)

Personal information
- Native name: 濱ノ嶋 啓志
- Born: Keishi Hamasu; 21 March 1970 (age 56) Uto, Kumamoto, Japan
- Height: 1.78 m (5 ft 10 in)
- Weight: 126 kg (278 lb; 19.8 st)

Sport
- Sport: Sumo
- University team: Nihon University
- Retired: May, 2004
- Heya: Mihogaseki
- Record: 447-495-23
- Debut: January, 1992
- Highest rank: Komusubi (September, 1994)
- Elder name: Onoe
- Championships: 1 (Jūryō)
- Special Prizes: Outstanding Performance (1)
- Updated on July 2012

Hamanoshima Keishi (濱ノ嶋 啓志, born 21 March 1970 as Keishi Hamasu) is a former sumo wrestler from Uto, Kumamoto Prefecture, Japan. A former amateur champion, he became a professional in 1992, reaching the top makuuchi division in 1994. His highest rank was komusubi. After his retirement from active competition in 2004 he became an elder of the Japan Sumo Association and founded Onoe stable in 2006, which has produced a number of top division wrestlers.

== Career ==
He took part in national sumo competitions at high school and was an amateur champion at Nihon University, where he was a contemporary of the future maegashira Higonoumi. He made his professional debut in January 1992, joining Mihogaseki stable. He had makushita tsukedashi status because of his amateur achievements and so began at the bottom of the makushita division. He won the jūryō division championship in September 1993 with an 11–4 record. He reached the top makuuchi division in January 1994. In July of the same year he won the Outstanding Performance Award for defeating tournament winner Takanohana, which proved to be his only special prize. He reached his highest rank of komusubi the following tournament in September 1994, but scored only six wins against nine losses and never made the rank again. Suffering from diabetes he was demoted from the top division in March 2001 after 39 consecutive tournaments as a maegashira, and after being demoted from the jūryō division in January 2002 he fought in the unsalaried makushita division for the last two years of his career.

== Retirement from sumo ==
He retired in May 2004, becoming an elder of the Japan Sumo Association under the name Onoe-oyakata. His danpatsu-shiki or official retirement ceremony was held in the Ryōgoku Kokugikan in January 2005. In August 2006 he branched out from Mihogaseki and set up his own Onoe stable, against the wishes of his old stablemaster Mihogaseki-oyakata (who had wanted him to stay and eventually inherit Mihogaseki stable). Onoe took with him six wrestlers he had recruited, including the top division wrestler Baruto and jūryō Satoyama. This marked the first time since Aobajō left Nishonoseki stable for Oshiogawa stable in 1975 that a makuuchi wrestler had left an established stable for a newly founded one. The Sumo Association subsequently tightened the rules for branching out, requiring elders wishing to set up their own stables to have at least 60 tournaments in the top division or 25 in san'yaku (which would have prevented Onoe from branching out had new rules been in place then).

In April 2011 three of his wrestlers (Yamamotoyama, Shirononami and Sakaizawa) were forced to retire by the Japan Sumo Association because of match-fixing. Onoe was demoted two ranks in the Association' elder hierarchy as punishment. In the same month he was found by police to be allegedly driving while intoxicated. Onoe apologised for his actions at a press conference.

== Fighting style ==
Hamanoshima was a yotsu-sumo wrestler, who preferred grabbing the mawashi to pushing or thrusting. He favoured a hidari-yotsu grip, with his right hand outside and left hand inside his opponent's position. His most common winning kimarite was a straightforward yori-kiri or force out. He was also fond of tsuki-otoshi, or thrust over. He was known for stalling at the tachi-ai to unsettle his opponents.

== Career record ==
Hamanoshima Keishi
| Year | January Hatsu basho, Tokyo | March Haru basho, Osaka | May Natsu basho, Tokyo | July Nagoya basho, Nagoya | September Aki basho, Tokyo | November Kyūshū basho, Fukuoka |
|---|---|---|---|---|---|---|
| 1992 | Makushita tsukedashi #60; 5–2 | West Makushita #40; 4–3 | East Makushita #31; 5–2 | East Makushita #16; 6–1 | East Makushita #6; 5–2 | East Makushita #2; 5–2 |
| 1993 | West Jūryō #12; 10–5 | East Jūryō #5; 10–5 | West Jūryō #2; 8–7 | East Jūryō #2; 7–8 | West Jūryō #3; 11–4; Champion | East Jūryō #1; 9–6 |
| 1994 | East Maegashira #14; 8–7 | West Maegashira #11; 8–7 | East Maegashira #8; 8–7 | East Maegashira #2; 8–7; O | West Komusubi #1; 6–9 | West Maegashira #1; 6–9 |
| 1995 | East Maegashira #3; 4–11 | East Maegashira #8; 6–9 | West Maegashira #10; 7–8 | West Maegashira #12; 9–6 | West Maegashira #2; 3–12 | West Maegashira #11; 8–7 |
| 1996 | West Maegashira #9; 6–9 | West Maegashira #13; 8–7 | West Maegashira #8; 6–9 | West Maegashira #13; 8–7 | West Maegashira #12; 9–6 | West Maegashira #5; 5–10 |
| 1997 | East Maegashira #9; 6–9 | West Maegashira #13; 8–7 | East Maegashira #10; 6–9 | East Maegashira #14; 9–6 | West Maegashira #10; 9–6 | West Maegashira #2; 4–11 |
| 1998 | West Maegashira #7; 5–10 | West Maegashira #12; 8–7 | West Maegashira #8; 8–7 | East Maegashira #6; 4–11 | East Maegashira #12; 8–7 | East Maegashira #5; 3–12 |
| 1999 | West Maegashira #12; 9–6 | West Maegashira #9; 6–9 | West Maegashira #13; 9–6 | East Maegashira #9; 6–9 | West Maegashira #12; 8–7 | East Maegashira #10; 8–7 |
| 2000 | East Maegashira #5; 5–10 | East Maegashira #9; 8–7 | West Maegashira #2; 3–12 | East Maegashira #10; 6–9 | West Maegashira #13; 9–6 | West Maegashira #2; 4–11 |
| 2001 | East Maegashira #9; 6–9 | East Maegashira #11; 5–10 | West Jūryō #2; 5–9–1 | West Jūryō #8; Sat out due to injury 0–0–15 | West Jūryō #8; 5–10 | West Jūryō #13; 9–6 |
| 2002 | West Jūryō #8; 4–11 | West Makushita #2; 2–5 | East Makushita #10; 5–2 | East Makushita #3; 3–4 | West Makushita #8; 5–2 | East Makushita #3; 3–4 |
| 2003 | West Makushita #7; 4–3 | West Makushita #3; 3–4 | West Makushita #7; 2–5 | West Makushita #19; 4–3 | West Makushita #14; 5–2 | East Makushita #7; 3–4 |
| 2004 | East Makushita #9; 3–4 | East Makushita #17; 4–3 | West Makushita #13; Retired; 0–0–2 | x | x | x |
Record given as wins–losses–absences Top division champion Top division runner-up Retired Lower divisions Non-participation Sanshō key: F=Fighting spirit; O=Outstanding performance; T=Technique Also shown: ★=Kinboshi; P=Playoff(s); Divisions: Makuuchi — Jūryō — Makushita — Sandanme — Jonidan — Jonokuchi Makuuchi ranks: Yokozuna — Ōzeki — Sekiwake — Komusubi — Maegashira

== See also ==
- Glossary of sumo terms
- List of sumo tournament second division champions
- List of past sumo wrestlers
- List of sumo elders
- List of komusubi
