= Onoe stable =

Organization of sumo wrestlers

Coordinates: 35.5707°N 139.6988°E

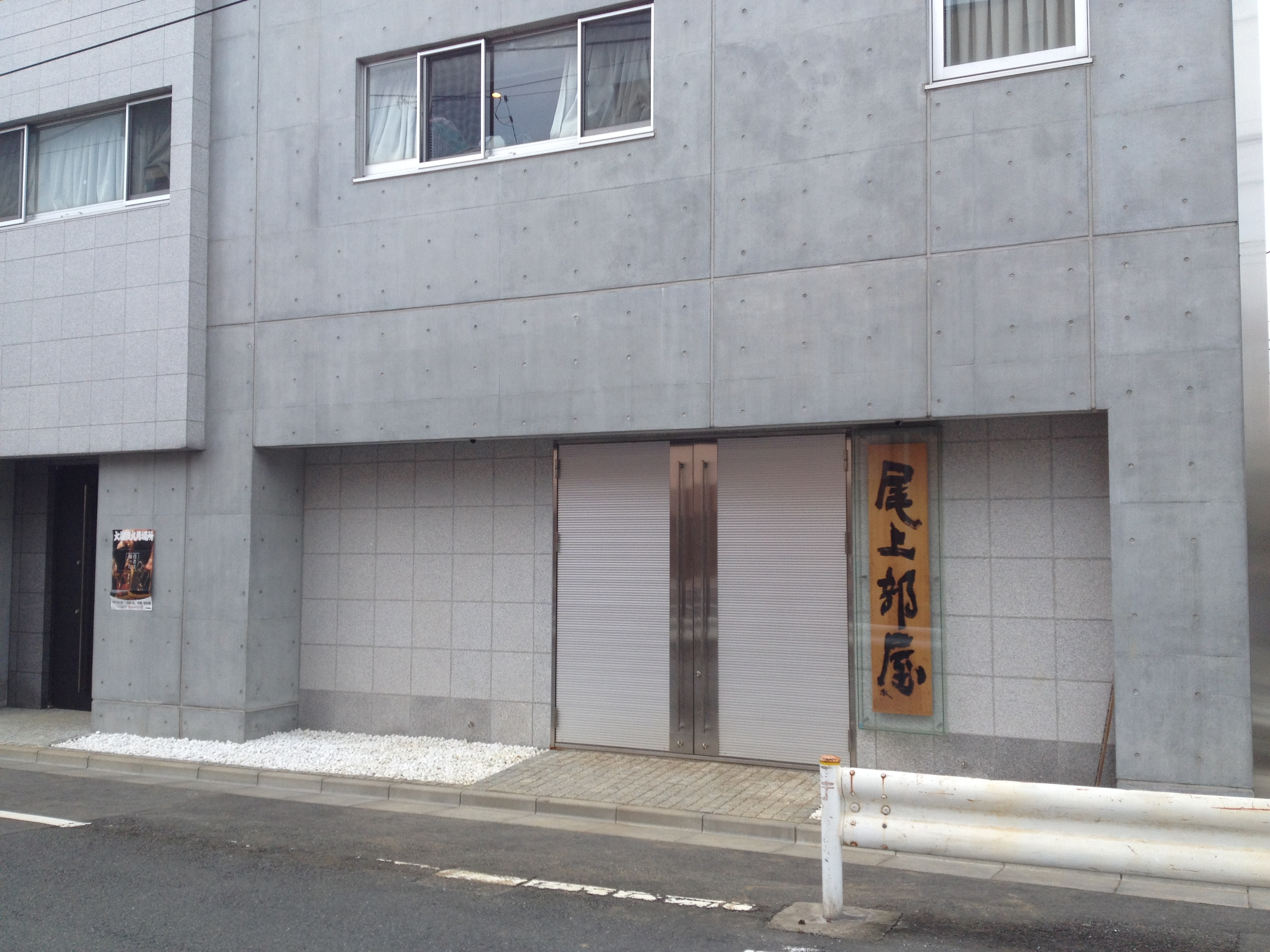
Onoe stable (2014)

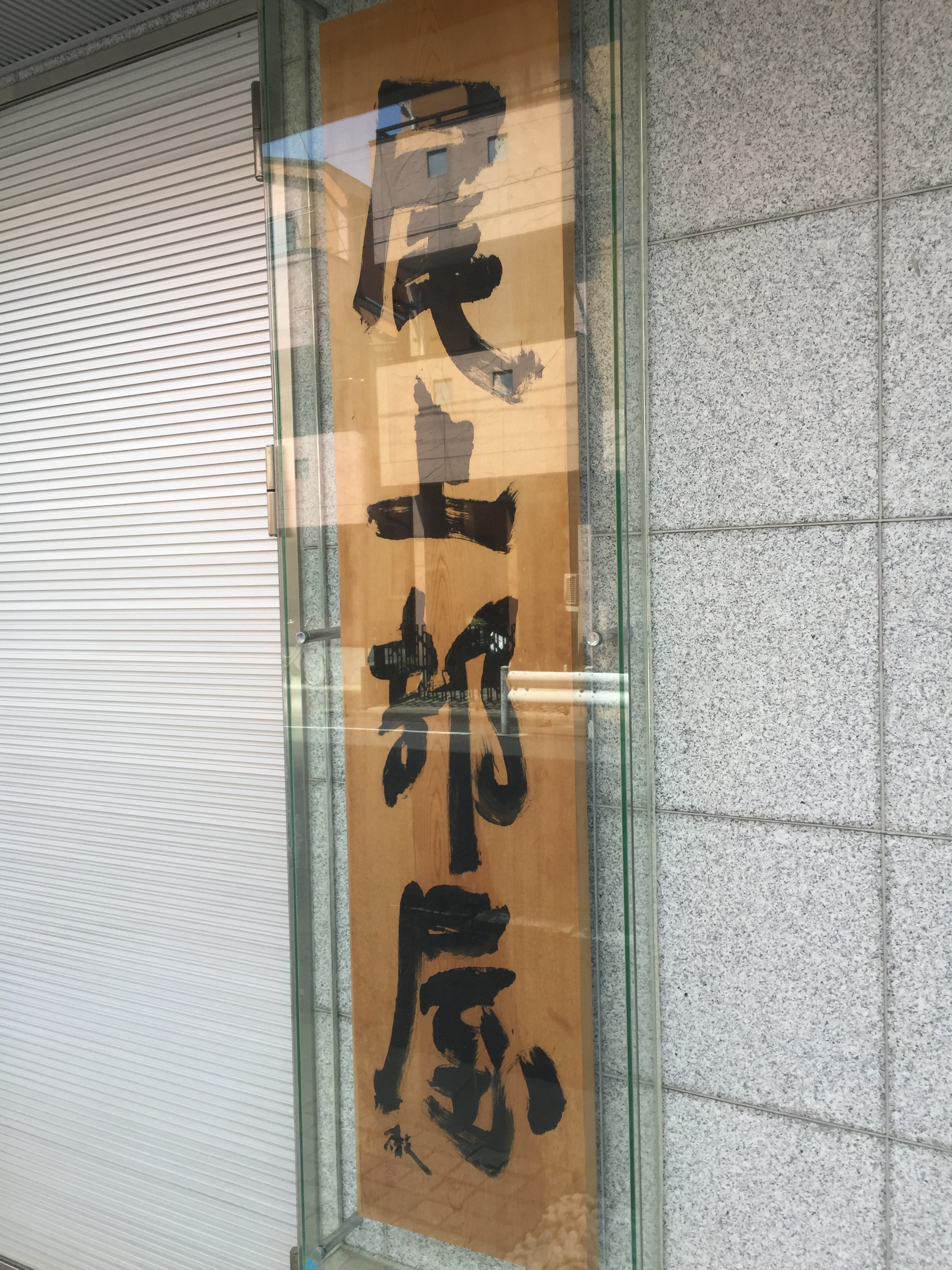

Onoe stable (Japanese: 尾上部屋, Hepburn: Onoe-beya) is a stable of sumo wrestlers, part of the Dewanoumi group of stables. It is situated in Tokyo's Ōta ward. It was established in August 2006 by former komusubi Hamanoshima, who branched off from Mihogaseki stable and took several of its leading wrestlers with him. For its first few years, Onoe stable was located in what was essentially a "converted garage," where numerous miscellaneous items were only about a meter away from the edge of the practice ring's straw bales.

In November 2007, it had eight wrestlers, half of whom were ranked as sekitori (in the top two divisions). In 2011, three of its wrestlers, maegashira ranked Sakaizawa, and Yamamotoyama and the former jūryō Shirononami, were forced to retire after being found guilty by the Japan Sumo Association of match-fixing. The retirements of Satoyama in November 2018 and Tenkaihō in March 2019 left the stable with no wrestlers in the top two divisions until Ryūkō reached jūryō in July 2019, but he suddenly left sumo in September 2021 due to an ankle injury. It has posted regular updates from its Facebook page since training at the stable was curtailed due to the COVID-19 pandemic.

As of May 2026, the stable has 14 active wrestlers.

== Owner ==
- 2006–present: 17th Onoe (riji, komusubi Hamanoshima, born 1970)

== Coaches ==
- Chiganoura Kōsaku (iin, maegashira Satoyama, born 1981)

== Notable former members ==
- Baruto (ōzeki, born 1984)
- Sakaizawa (maegashira 15, born 1983)
- Satoyama (maegashira 12, born 1981)
- Tenkaihō (maegashira 8, born 1984)
- Yamamotoyama (maegashira 9, born 1984)
- Shirononami (jūryō 4, born 1981)
- Ryūkō (jūryō 12, born 1998)

== Location ==
Tokyo, Ōta ward, Ikegami 8-8-8

== See also ==
- List of sumo stables
- List of active sumo wrestlers
- List of past sumo wrestlers
- Glossary of sumo terms
