= Takafumi =

Takafumi (written: 貴文, 貴史, 孝史, 崇文, 岳文, 敬史, 隆文, 隆史 or 隆普美) is a masculine Japanese given name. Notable people with the name include:

- Takafumi Akahoshi (赤星 貴文, born 1986), Japanese footballer
- Takafumi Hori (堀 孝史, born 1967), Japanese footballer and manager
- Takafumi Horie (堀江 貴文, born 1972), Japanese entrepreneur who founded Livedoor, a website design operation
- Takafumi Isomura (磯村 隆文, 1930–2007), Japanese politician
- Takafumi Iwasaki (岩崎 貴文, born 1976), Japanese guitarist, lyricist, music arranger, and musical artist
- Takafumi Kawabata (川端 隆普美, born 1954), Japanese ski jumper
- Takafumi Kawakami (川上 貴史), Japanese voice actor
- Takafumi Kanazawa (金澤 崇文, born 1981), Japanese footballer
- Takafumi Matsuda (松田 隆文, born 1951), Japanese cyclist
- Takafumi Mikuriya (御厨 貴文, born 1984), Japanese footballer
- Takafumi Nishitani (西谷 岳文, born 1979), Japanese speed skater
- Takafumi Ogura (小倉 隆史, born 1973), Japanese footballer
- Takafumi Shimizu (清水 貴文, born 1992), Japanese footballer
- Takafumi Yamashita (山下 敬史, born 1987), Japanese ice hockey player
- Takafumi Yoshimoto (吉本 岳史, born 1978), Japanese footballer

== Fictional characters ==
- Takafumi Udo, the main antagonist in Ultraman (2004 film)
