= Yamamotoyama Ryūta =

Japanese sumo wrestler (born 1984)

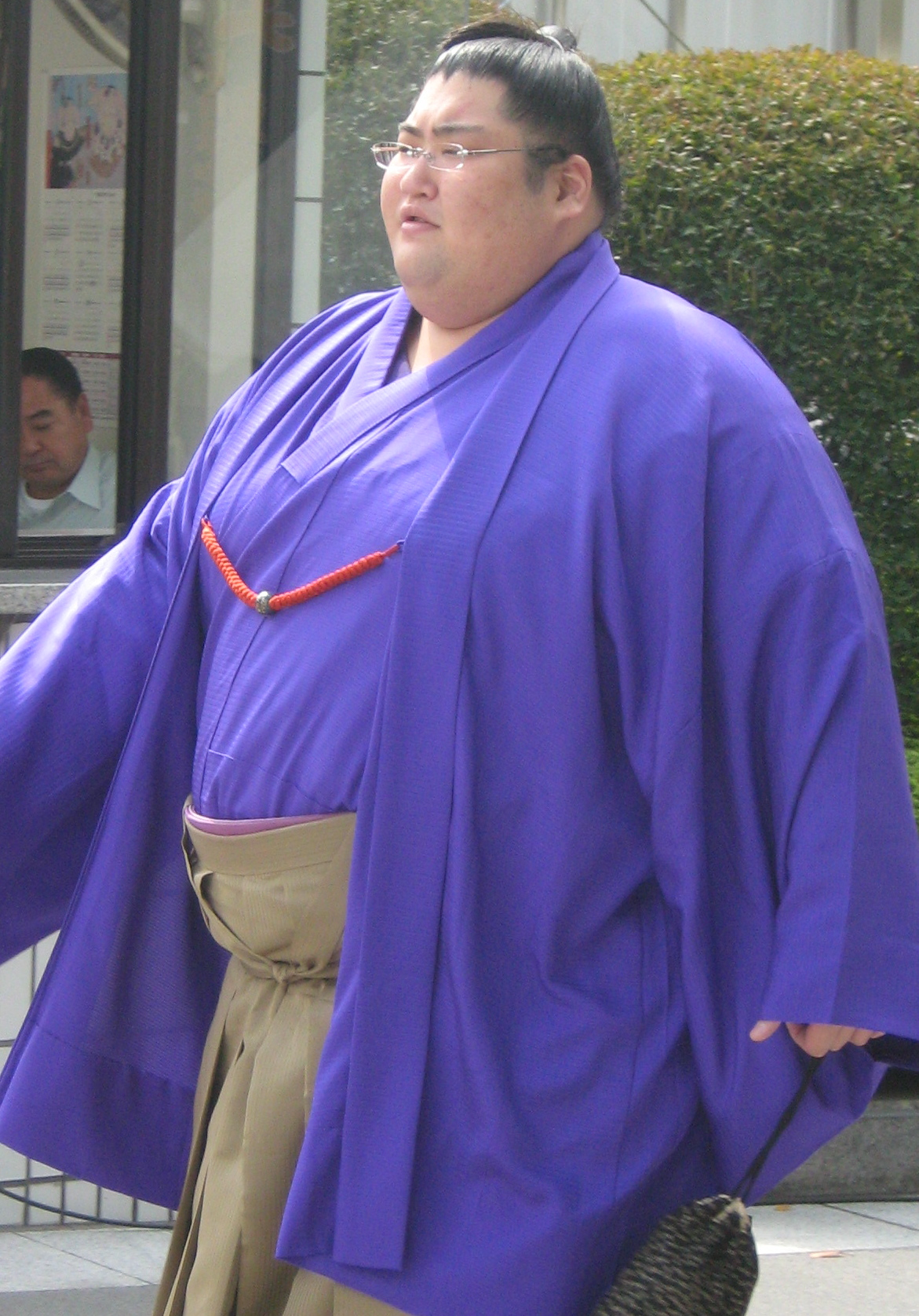
- Yamamotoyama Ryūta in 2008

Personal information
- Native name: 山本山 龍太
- Born: Yamamoto Ryūichi; May 8, 1984 (age 42) Saitama, Japan
- Height: 1.93 m (6 ft 4 in)
- Weight: 272 kg (600 lb; 42.8 st)

Sport
- Sport: Sumo
- University team: Nihon University
- Retired: April 2011
- Heya: Onoe
- Record: 131-107-34
- Debut: January 2007
- Highest rank: Maegashira 9 (May 2009)
- Championships: 1 (Makushita); 1 (Jonidan)
- Updated on May 2022

Ryūichi Yamamoto (山本 龍一, Yamamoto Ryūichi; born May 8, 1984), known by his shikona Yamamotoyama Ryūta (山本山 龍太), or simply Yama, is a Japanese retired sumo wrestler from the city of Saitama in Saitama Prefecture. He made his professional debut in January 2007, and reached the top makuuchi division in January 2009. His highest rank was maegashira 9. At 265 kg (584 lb), Yamamotoyama is the heaviest Japanese-born sumo wrestler in history, and is also thought to be the heaviest Japanese person ever. In April 2011, he was told to retire by the Japan Sumo Association after he and several other wrestlers were found to be involved in match-fixing. He currently participates in sumo exhibitions and amateur tournaments, and has made a number of appearances in television shows, commercials and music videos.

== Career ==
Yamamotoyama won several local, national and world sumo championships before entering Nihon University in 2003. He won a total of five championships at Nihon University. He then entered professional sumo as a member of the Onoe stable. He broke the record for the largest new recruit, weighing in at 233 kg in 2007. The previous record holder, Hokutomori, weighed in at 205 kg when he joined professional sumo in 1994. His shikona or fighting name was created simply by adding the suffix yama (meaning "mountain") to his own surname. This is common for lower ranked wrestlers but it was rather unusual for him to keep it even after reaching sekitori status. Yamamotoyama however, shares his name with a well-known producer of Japanese seaweed and tea, with whom he was reportedly keen to secure a sponsorship deal.

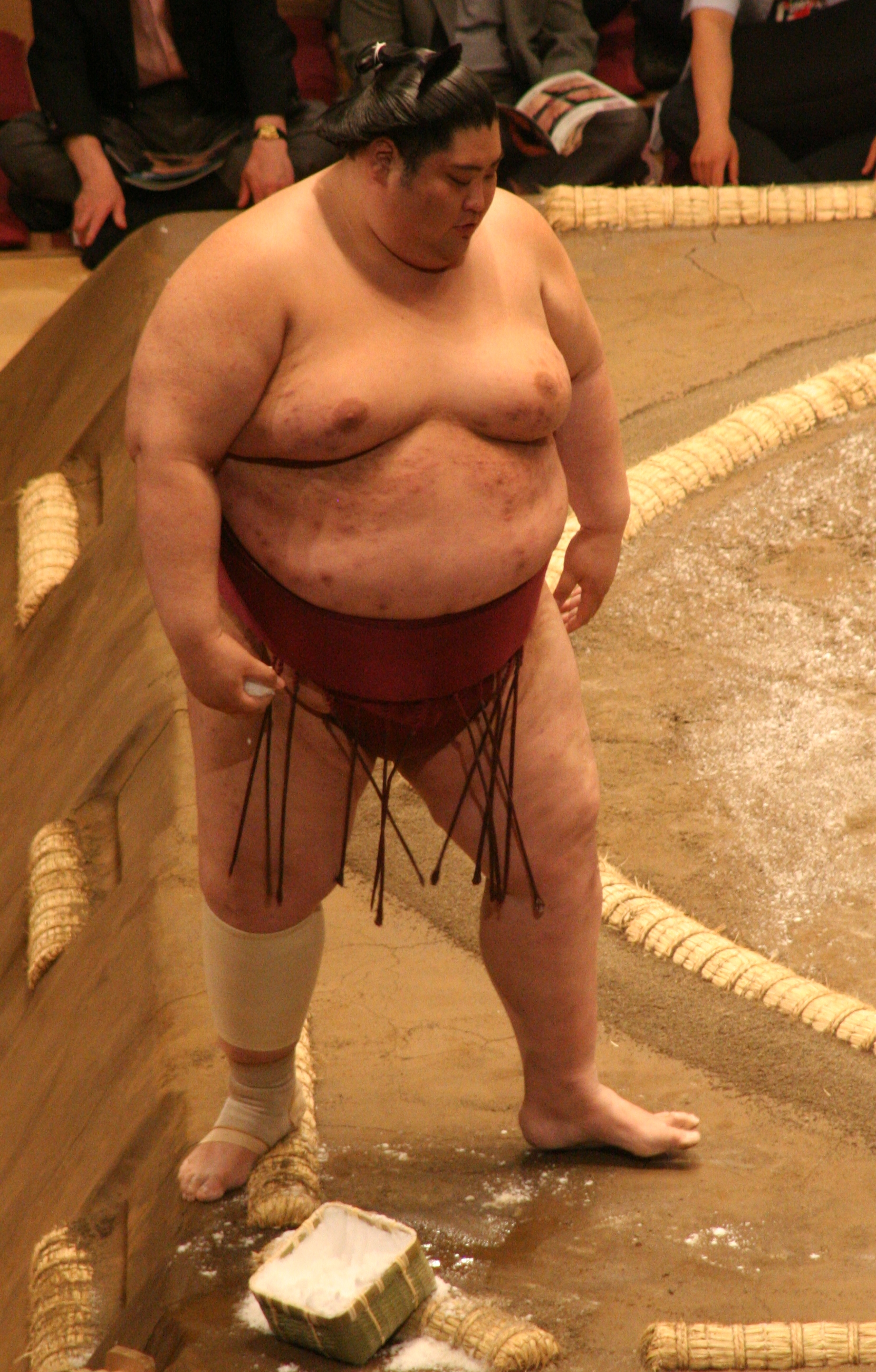
Yamamotoyama in May 2009

Yamamotoyama rose quickly through the ranks, recording only one make-koshi before reaching the second division of jūryō at the 2008 September tournament, nearly winning the third division championship in the process, failing only to win the final bout of an eight-way playoff, losing to stablemate Satoyama. Upon his promotion he posed for photographers with two bags of rice and told reporters that he was aiming for 241 kg in weight, to break the record for a Japanese rikishi then held by Susanoumi. Only two wrestlers have weighed more than him: Hawaiian born Konishiki at 285 kg (628 lb), and Russian sandanme rikishi Orora at 288 kg (635 lb). Yamamotoyama once reportedly ate 146 pieces of sushi in a single meal.

After posting nine wins in consecutive jūryō tournaments, he was promoted to the top makuuchi division for the 2009 January tournament. The twelve tournaments it took him to enter the top division ties him with Tochiazuma, among others, in a group of the second fastest wrestlers to reach this level. He came through with a kachi-koshi winning record of 8-7 in his debut makuuchi tournament, and followed up with another 8-7 in March 2009. He failed to get his kachi-koshi on the final day of the May 2009 tournament, for only the second time in his career.

He suffered a muscle pull in his ribcage during the July 2009 tournament after falling to the floor of the dohyo twice in two bouts against Wakakoyu on Day 9 and had to withdraw for the first time in his career. He fell to the jūryō division for the September tournament as a result. He scored 9-6 there, enough for an immediate makuuchi return. However he entered the Kyushu basho in November 2009 in poor condition, having injured his right elbow whilst on tour in October, and he eventually withdrew from the tournament with only two wins, after being diagnosed with influenza. Remaining in the jūryō division, he suffered knee ligament damage on the 11th day of the July 2010 tournament and was forced to withdraw. Still troubled by the injury, he pulled out on the first day of the September tournament, and as a result was demoted to the makushita division. Following his loss of sekitori status, he resumed menial duties at Onoe stable, becoming the head chanko chef. Due to his injury he was unable to do any keiko (training) except walking. After fighting only one bout from the rank of Makushita 13, he withdrew from the November tournament as well. His continuing absence saw him drop to the fourth sandanme division for the (cancelled) March 2011 basho.

== Retirement ==
In April 2011, along with 18 other wrestlers, he was ordered to retire by the Japan Sumo Association (JSA) after an investigation into allegations of bout-rigging prompted by the discovery of text messages on the mobile phone of fellow juryo wrestler Kasuganishiki, which alleged Yamamotoyama's involvement in throwing matches. He responded angrily to the decision, saying "The JSA made up its mind from the start that I cheated without listening to me." However, on April 5 he visited the Ryōgoku Kokugikan to hand in his retirement papers, alongside stablemates Sakaizawa and Shirononami who were also found guilty. He had a retirement ceremony at the Tokyo Prince Hotel in September 2011, alongside Sakaizawa. Yamamoto told Sports Illustrated in 2022, "I was doing it although I knew it was wrong... To tell the truth, you were not fighting as hard as you could." However, he felt that he was scapegoated and the practice was more widespread than the JSA was admitting.

== Post-retirement activities ==
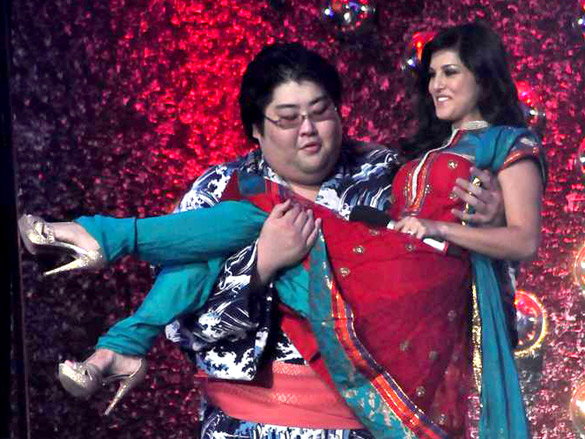
Yamamotoyama lifting Indian-Canadian actress Sunny Leone on the set of Bigg Boss

In 2012, he appeared in the 5th season of India's biggest reality show Bigg Boss. Before entering, he told the reporters that he had already seen the 4th season of the show and that he loved both the show and Indian culture, despite not knowing Hindi or English. He was given special placards with pictorial representations that helped him to communicate his needs to the housemates. To ensure that Yamamotoyama remained entertained, special activities had been planned during his stay in the house that helped audiences to get some special insights into the life of a professional Japanese sumo wrestler. He entered the house on Day 91 as a guest, and bid a farewell after a day of stay there. In their last week Yamamotoyama would teach origami to Bigg Boss 5 inmates.

In 2013 Yamamotoyama participated in a multi-city "Sumo + Sushi" show tour in the United States, co-sponsored by Living Social and USA Sumo. Attendees were shown sumo training exercises and then actual (albeit somewhat restrained) bouts between Yamamotoyama and other sumo stars such Ulambayaryn Byambajav and Kelly Gneiting. In February 2015, Yamamotoyama was the celebrity guest for Koyasan Buddhist Temple’s annual Hoshimatsuri service, where he is a volunteer and regular attendee. In 2014 he appeared in the music video for One Direction's "Steal My Girl." In May 2015, he appeared on the American television program The Bachelorette along with Ulambayaryn, and in 2017 starred in the music video for the song "Shape of You" by English artist Ed Sheeran. Also in 2017 he was featured in the Hollywood motion picture John Wick 2 with Keanu Reeves. In June of 2021, Yamamotoyama was featured in the OFFCANNY YouTube video, we became sumo wrestlers.

In 2021, he was USA Sumo's head coach and sumo ambassador. He regularly appears in commercials on US television which require a sumo wrestler. He ran the Yamamoto Sumo Dojo in Los Angeles from 2021 until it disbanded in 2023.

Also in 2021, he was married in the USA.

In 2022, Nick DiGiovanni, an American chef, cooked a 5-course meal for him.

In 2023 he published a sumo Handbook that also contains insider stories from his sumo experience, Yamamoto Sumo Secrets. It was the first sumo handbook to be printed in English.

He quit working with the sumo entertainment management team in Los Angeles in 2023, and currently lives in St. Louis, Missouri, where he is head coach of the Show Me Sumo club.

== Fighting style ==
Yamamotoyama's most common winning kimarite or technique was yori-kiri, the force out, and he preferred a migi-yotsu, or left hand outside, right hand inside grip on his opponent's mawashi. He also regularly won by oshi-dashi, the push out, and uwatenage, the overarm throw.

== Career record ==
Yamamotoyama Ryūta
Year	January Hatsu basho, Tokyo	March Haru basho, Osaka	May Natsu basho, Tokyo	July Nagoya basho, Nagoya	September Aki basho, Tokyo	November Kyūshū basho, Fukuoka
2007	(Maezumo)	East Jonokuchi #32; 6–1	East Jonidan #61; 7–0–P; Champion	West Sandanme #59; 6–1	West Sandanme #6; 6–1	East Makushita #32; 1–6
2008	East Makushita #58; 7–0; Champion	East Makushita #6; 5–2	East Makushita #2; 4–3	West Makushita #1; 6–1–PPP	East Jūryō #12; 9–6	West Jūryō #3; 9–6
2009	West Maegashira #15; 8–7	West Maegashira #13; 8–7	West Maegashira #9; 7–8	East Maegashira #11; 4–7–4	West Jūryō #2; 9–6	East Maegashira #15; 2–12–1
2010	West Jūryō #9; 7–8	West Jūryō #10; 7–8	West Jūryō #11; 8–7	East Jūryō #10; 5–7–3	West Jūryō #13; 0–1–14	West Makushita #13; 0–2–5
2011	West Makushita #48; Sat out due to injury 0–0–7	East Sandanme #31; Tournament Cancelled; Match fixing investigation 0–0–0	East Sandanme #31; Retired –	x	x	x
Record given as wins–losses–absences Top division champion Top division runner-up Retired Lower divisions Non-participation Sanshō key: F=Fighting spirit; O=Outstanding performance; T=Technique Also shown: ★=Kinboshi; P=Playoff(s); Divisions: Makuuchi — Jūryō — Makushita — Sandanme — Jonidan — Jonokuchi Makuuchi ranks: Yokozuna — Ōzeki — Sekiwake — Komusubi — Maegashira

== See also ==
- Glossary of sumo terms
- List of heaviest sumo wrestlers
- List of past sumo wrestlers
