= Magical Girl Apocalypse =

Japanese manga series

- The cover of the first volume

魔法少女・オブ・ジ・エンド (Mahō Shōjo obu ji Endo)
- Genre: Action; Psychological horror
- Manga
- Written by: Kentarō Satō
- Published by: Akita Shoten
- English publisher: NA: Seven Seas Entertainment
- Imprint: Shōnen Champion Comics
- Magazine: Bessatsu Shōnen Champion
- Original run: July 2012 – August 2017
- Volumes: 16

Magical Girl Apocalypse, known in Japan as Magical Girl of the End (魔法少女・オブ・ジ・エンド, Mahō Shōjo obu ji Endo), is a Japanese action-horror magical girl shōnen manga series written and illustrated by Kentarō Satō. It began publication in July 2012 in the manga magazine Bessatsu Shōnen Champion, published by Akita Shoten, and has been compiled into sixteen tankōbon volumes as of September 2017. The series is published in North America by Seven Seas Entertainment. A spin-off series called Magical Girl Site was later made that shares the same themes.

== Plot ==
Average high schooler Kii Kogami is bored with everyday life and hopes that something interesting may happen. Things turn from bad to worse when a strange-looking girl arrives and massacres almost everyone in Kogami's class, reanimates them, and begins to take over the rest of the world alongside her minions. Luckily for him, Kogami manages to escape the building along with his childhood friend Tsukune, and teams up with the rest of the survivors to stop the mysterious figure's plots to end humanity, and the world.

== Characters ==
=== Main characters ===
Kii Kogami (児上 貴衣, Kogami Kii)
Kii Kogami is a normal high school freshman who doesn't want to get involved in anything that could add stress to his life, making him do such things as ignoring his childhood friend Tsukune's bullying by Miki and Kaede. His father was an abusive alcoholic who was frequently in and out of prison, and whose abuse led to the suicide of Kii's mother. In order to escape his home life, Kii would spend a great deal of time at Tsukune's house, which he considered his happy place.
Rintaro Akuta (芥 倫太郎, Akuta Rintarō)
Akuta Rintaro was a police officer before the magical girl attack. His sanity had slipped by the time he meets the survivors from the high school, who sought refuge in the mall where he was apparently working. At first he behaves like a complete cretin, becoming sexually aroused and taking his genitalia out at the sight of two dead, under dressed girls and intending to rape Yoruka and Tsukune. He is knocked out by Ren and handcuffed to a fixed structure for safe keeping. When Parasite M begins her rampage, however, he is released and ends up being the one to finally kill her by squashing her between his hands like a mosquito. Since then Akuta has proven to be well-adapted to his new environment and somewhat useful, being the first to figure out that humans could use the magical girl's wands as well. At the medical center, he loses his right arm by way of Explode M.

He has nicknamed Yoruka "titty-chan" ("Lil' Miss Funbags" in the English translation) due to her large breasts. Although he appears to have developed legitimate feelings for her, his main interest remains her chest.
Tsukune Fukumoto (福本 つくね, Fukumoto Tsukune)
Tsukune Fukumoto is a childhood friend of Kogami Kii. As a child, she proclaimed that her greatest wish was to become Kii's wife. She was often bullied by Kaede and Miki in high school, which is revealed to have been orchestrated by Tsukune herself. At first she appears to have an innocent, childish demeanor. However, she seems to house another entity named Asuka, who is more sadistic. When he was transported to 2002 and visited the young Tsukune's household, Kii discovers that the "treasure chest" she had kept at the time contained drawings and dolls of the magical girls that were then running free, all but confirming her involvement in the matter. She happens to have a connection to the magical girls that are attacking the city: She's a magical girl by family lineage.
Kaede Sayano (鞘野 楓, Sayano Kaede)
Sayano Kaede is in the same year as Kogami. Along with Ootsuki Miki, she cruelly bullied Tsukune. Kaede has been in love with Kii ever since she was a child. The hairclip she wears was given to her in the past by Kii because her hair was always so messy; she considers it ugly, but wears it because of her feelings for its giver.
Yoruka Hanzawa (半沢 夜華, Hanzawa Yoruka)
A second-year student with an impressive bust. Initially she uses a taser as a weapon, which she carried to take care of perverts, but loses it in the mall. Her parents separated when she was younger after her mother found out her father was cheating on her. After that, seeking company she never got from her working mother, she instead hung out with guys who were drawn to her for her body; it never elevated to anything sexual. Between the two, Yoruka stopped trusting men altogether. In Ren, she finally finds a guy she could believe in, but does not confess her feelings to him until his final moments. She is later killed by the magical parasite girl in the hospital.
Ren Kushiro (久代 蓮, Kushiro Ren)
Kushiro Ren was an aspiring student at Todai Medical College. He quickly falls for Yoruka, asking her to go out with him should they survive their ordeal, and becomes the first man she opens up to. He was killed by a magical girl at the university hospital; his reanimated self was subsequently destroyed by Akuta.
Wataru Himeji (姫路 弥, Himeji Wataru)
A mysterious deaf boy in Kii and Tsukune's class at school. There seems to be more than what he shows. He is revealed to be the first/second main antagonist.
Mikano Hanakai (無六 みかの, Hakanai Mikano)
Protagonist of the second season, like Tsukune she's also a magical girl by blood and her power involves creating and manipulating explosions. A childhood friend of Shinobu Shirakane.

=== Magical Girls ===
Explode M (Magical) / Ribs (エクスプロド・M（マジカル）/ リブ)
Featured on the cover of Volume 1 and the first Magical Girl to appear in the series. At the start of the series, she instantly massacres the entirety of Kogami’s classmates and turns them into zombies, kicking off the plot of the entire manga. She is dressed in a Gothic Lolita dress with her hair styled into twin tails supporting a large ribbon bow. Her eyes are large, round, and rolled so far back in her head that mostly the whites show. She carries an umbrella-like prop with a large sphere, which causes what ever it touches to explode. After her transformation she appears as a more mature girl, and can cause her target to explode without touching it.
Parasite M (Magical) / Hana-chan (パラサイト・M（マジカル）/ ハナちゃん)
Featured on the cover of Volume 2. Hana-chan is a mosquito-like parasite who enters through the mouth, she then attaches herself to the victim's brain, taking control. She is the only Magical Girl with the ability to communicate with humans as she talks through her host, usually with a child-like voice (ex. "sworry"). Hana-chan's transformation boosts the physical strength of her host and allows her to take total control of the body, reducing the original head to a grotesque growth while her own takes the host's place. Her hair also grows longer, and her flower shifts to the center of the part in her bangs.
Attraction M (Magical) / Roro (アトラクション・M（マジカル）/ ロロ)
Featured on the cover of Volume 3 with her counterpart Koko (Repulsion). Roro's main activity was to use her wand to draw people into a sphere high above the ground, then let them fall to their deaths. When she tried that with Akuta, he stabbed her in the head with a knife when he got close enough, and took her wand. In a parallel universe that appears later in the series, she works to help protect Kaede.
Repulsion M (Magical) / Koko (レパルション・M（マジカル）/ ココ)
Featured on the cover of Volume 3 with her counterpart Roro (Attraction.) While Roro is a smiling figure with heart-shaped hairpins, Koko is usually frowning, and her hairpins are an inverted version of her twin's. Likewise, their abilities are opposites: Koko's wands forces people and things away from her at incredible speed. Like her 'sister' Roro, she later works to help protect Kaede in a parallel universe.

== Release ==
Kentarō Satō began publishing the series in Akita Shoten's Bessatsu Shōnen Champion in July 2012. The series was licensed in English by Seven Seas Entertainment in January 2014. A two-part crossover with Katsutoshi Murase's Karada Sagashi manga, which is published in Shueisha's Shōnen Jump+, was released online as a one-shot in July 2015. Satō launched a brand new series manga, titled Magical Girl Site, on July 4, 2013. It ended in the September issue of Bessatsu Shōnen Champion.

=== Volumes ===
Sixteen tankōbon volumes have been released as of September 2017, all sixteen volumes have been published in English.

| No. | Original release date | Original ISBN | English release date | English ISBN |
|---|---|---|---|---|
| 1 | February 8, 2013 | 978-4-253-22026-2 | October 14, 2014 | 978-1-626920-78-1 |
| 2 | April 8, 2013 | 978-4-253-22027-9 | January 20, 2015 | 978-1-626921-04-7 |
| 3 | July 8, 2013 | 978-4-253-22028-6 | April 14, 2015 | 978-1-626921-26-9 |
| 4 | December 6, 2013 | 978-4-253-22029-3 | July 28, 2015 | 978-1-626921-59-7 |
| 5 | March 7, 2014 | 978-4-253-22030-9 | October 6, 2015 | 978-1-626922-06-8 |
| 6 | September 8, 2014 | 978-4-253-22031-6 | January 26, 2016 | 978-1-626922-34-1 |
| 7 | December 8, 2014 | 978-4-253-22032-3 | April 19, 2016 | 978-1-626922-57-0 |
| 8 | March 6, 2015 | 978-4-253-22033-0 | July 12, 2016 | 978-1-626922-89-1 |
| 9 | July 8, 2015 | 978-4-253-22034-7 | October 4, 2016 | 978-1-626923-44-7 |
| 10 | November 6, 2015 | 978-4-253-22035-4 | January 3, 2017 | 978-1-626923-84-3 |
| 11 | April 8, 2016 | 978-4-253-22037-8 | April 25, 2017 | 978-1-626924-53-6 |
| 12 | July 8, 2016 | 978-4-253-22038-5 | July 4, 2017 | 978-1-626925-07-6 |
| 13 | December 8, 2016 | 978-4-253-22039-2 | December 19, 2017 | 978-1-626925-92-2 |
| 14 | March 8, 2017 | 978-4-253-22040-8 | April 10, 2018 | 978-1-626927-22-3 |
| 15 | July 7, 2017 | 978-4-253-22041-5 | July 24, 2018 | 978-1-626928-51-0 |
| 16 | September 8, 2017 | 978-4-253-22042-2 | October 30, 2018 | 978-1-626929-22-7 |

== Reception ==
Volume 8 reached 16th place on the weekly Oricon manga charts and has sold 75,572 copies.

Anime News Network's Jason Thompson placed the manga at number 5 in a list of "10 Great Zombie Manga", stating that the series was "a great manga for Highschool of the Dead fans who want to move on to something rawer and funnier" and was enjoyable "if you hate Magical Girls and have ever wanted to see them dismembered and smashed into pieces by every means imaginable".

Also reviewing the series for Anime News Network, Rebecca Silverman gave the first volume a grade of B+, stating that the reader is "constantly lulled into a false sense of knowing who the survivors are and will be ... keeping everyone perpetually on edge." She was critical, however, of the series' fan service, writing "to say that this book is gross might be understating it a little, and that gruesome quality is made somehow the worse for the inclusion of panty shots with a carefully drawn line showing us the vulvas of the girls in question...who may or may not have whole heads at the moment of fanservice." She concluded her review by stating that "if you have the stomach for a lot of splatter and gross fanservice (or grossness and fanservice), Magical Girl Apocalypse's first volume is worth checking out."

== See also ==
- Immortality and Punishment, another manga series by the same creator
