= Takahiro Yamada =

Takahiro Yamada may refer to:

- Takahiro Yamada (footballer), Japanese footballer
- Takahiro Yamada (musician), bass player and backing singer with Asian Kung-Fu Generation
- Takahiro Yamada (gymnast), Japanese gymnast
