= Takahito =

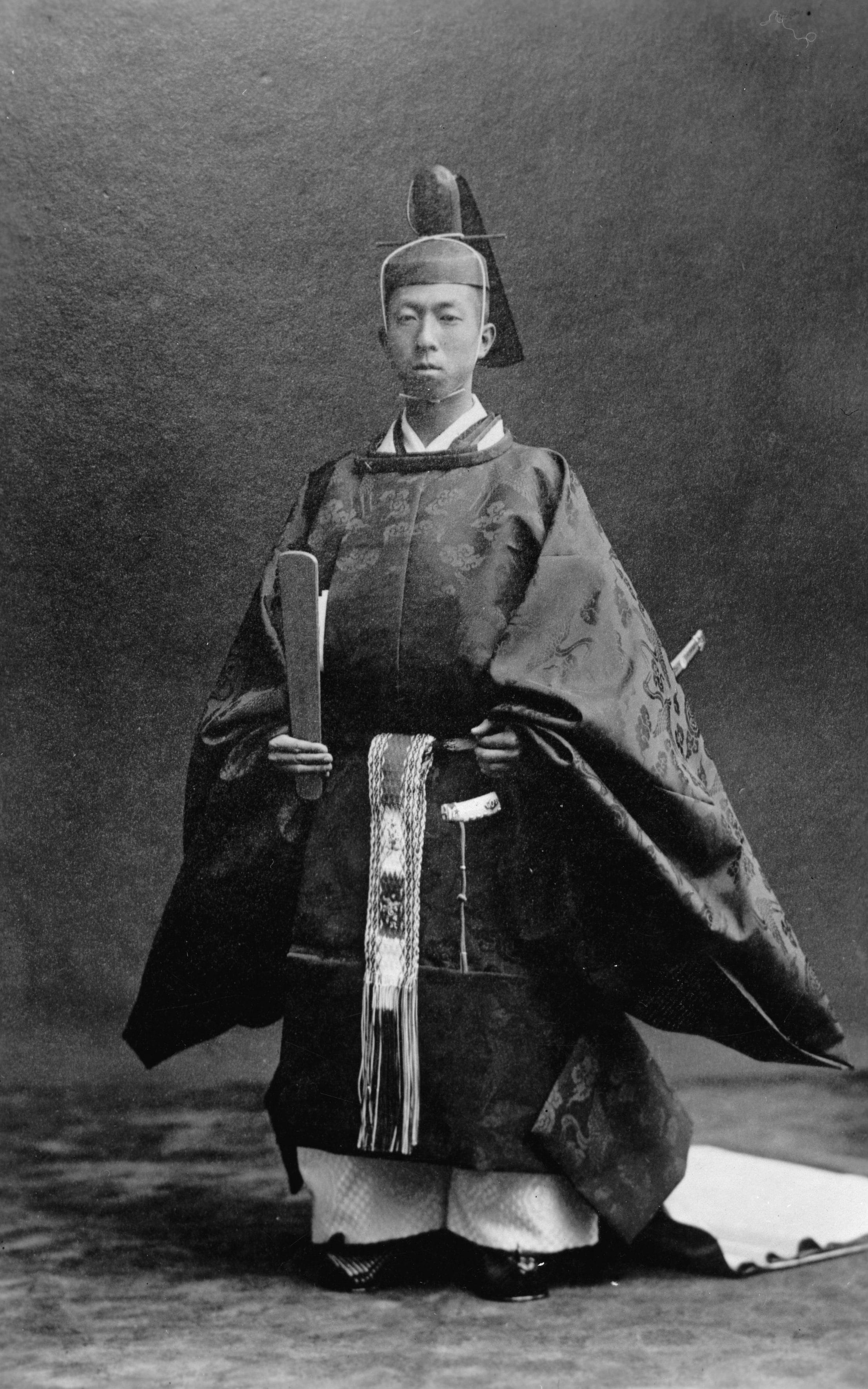
- Prince Takahito in 1937
- Pronunciation: Ta-ká-hi-to
- Gender: Male
- Language: Japanese

Origin
- Origin: Hiragana: たかひと; Katakana: タカヒト; Kanji: Various
- Meaning: Varies depending on the kanji used
- Region of origin: Japan

Other names
- Related names: Takahiro; Takaaki; Takayuki

Takahito (たかひと、タカヒト) is a masculine Japanese given name.

== Written forms ==
Takahito can be written using different kanji characters and can mean:

- 尊仁, "Preciousness, nobility" and "Benevolence, compassion"
- 幟仁, "Nobori, banner" and "Benevolence, compassion"
- 崇仁, "Worship, admiration" and "Benevolence, compassion"
- 貴仁, "Lord, goddess" and "Benevolence, compassion"
- 尚仁, "Greater, further" and "Benevolence, compassion"
- 崇人, "Worship, admiration" and "Person, human beings"
- 隆人, "Prosperity, flourishing" and "Person, human beings"
- 貴人, "Lord, goddess" and "Person, human beings"
- 貴士, "Lord, goddess" and "Warrior, samurai"
- 貴勅, "Lord, goddess" and "Imperial"

The name can also be written in hiragana or katakana.

== Notable people with the name ==
- Prince Takahito (尊仁; 1034–1073), later Emperor Go-Sanjō (後三条天皇), 71st emperor of Japan
- Takahito, Prince Mikasa (三笠宮崇仁親王; 1915–2016), 4th and youngest son of Emperor Taishō of Japan
- Prince Takahito Arisugawa (有栖川宮熾仁親王; 1835–1895), 8th head of the Arisugawa-no-miya house, one of the shinnōke branches of the Imperial Family of Japan
- Takahito Chiba (千葉 貴仁; born 1984), Japanese football player
- Takahito Nomura (野村 貴仁; born 1969), Japanese major-league baseball player
- Takahito Otsuka (大塚 尚仁; born 1994), Japanese former professional baseball pitcher
- Takahito Kudo (工藤 隆人; born 1981), Japanese Nippon Professional Baseball player
- Takahito Suzuki (鈴木 貴人; born 1975), Japanese professional ice hockey player
- Takahito Soma (相馬 崇人; born 1981), Japanese footballer
- Takahito Mura (無良 崇人; born 1991), Japanese figure skater
- Takahito Niimi (新美 貴士; born 1993), Japanese kickboxer
- Takahito Eguchi (江口 貴勅; born 1974), Japanese video game composer
