= Sakaizawa Kenichi =

Japanese sumo wrestler

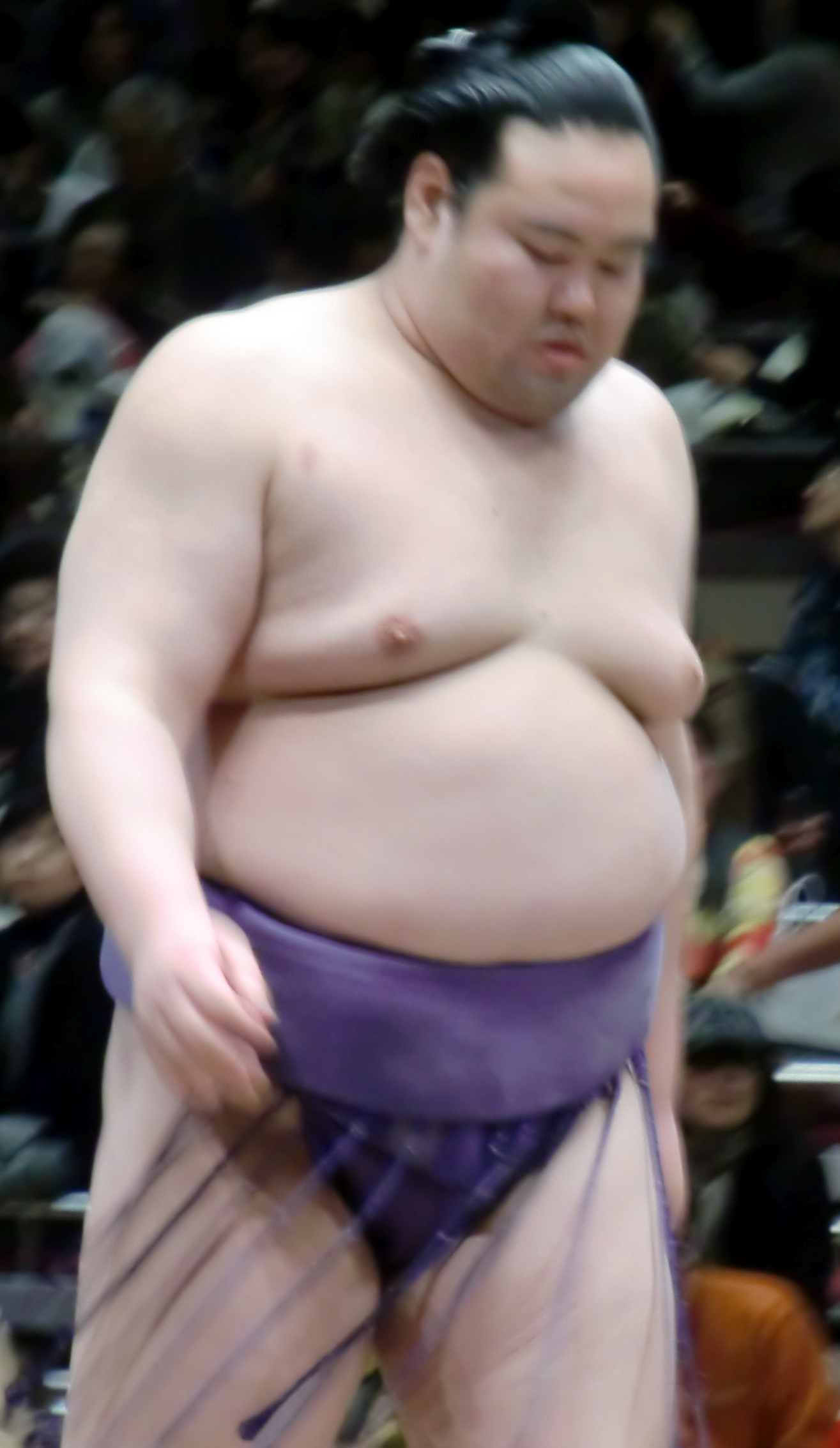

Personal information
- Native name: 境澤 賢一
- Born: Kenichi Sakaizawa; 11 April 1983 (age 43) Saitama, Japan
- Height: 1.89 m (6 ft 2 1/2 in)
- Weight: 162 kg (357 lb)

Sport
- Sport: Sumo
- Retired: May, 2011
- Heya: Mihogaseki → Onoe
- Record: 199-149-15
- Debut: March, 2006
- Highest rank: Maegashira 15 (March, 2008)
- Championships: 1 (Jūryō); 1 (Makushita); 1 (Jonokuchi)
- Updated on Sep. 2012

Sakaizawa Kenichi (born 11 April 1983 as Kenichi Sakaizawa) is a former sumo wrestler from Saitama, Japan. He made his professional debut in March 2006, and reached the top division in March 2008. His highest rank was maegashira 15. He was forced to retire by the Japan Sumo Association, as a result of the 2011 match-fixing scandal (yaocho).

== Career ==
He was born and raised in what is now Saitama City. He started sumo in the third grade. He went to Tottori Jōhoku High School and was an amateur sumo champion for Nihon University. He placed in the Best 16 at the All-Japan Sumo Tournament in his third and fourth years. He joined Mihogaseki stable in March 2006, but when Onoe Oyakata (former Hamanoshima) broke off and established Onoe stable in August of the same year, Sakaizawa followed him. He rose quickly up the ranks, losing just two bouts in his first five tournaments and winning two yusho or tournament championships in the jonokuchi and makushita divisions with perfect 7–0 records. He made his debut as an elite sekitori ranked wrestler in July 2007 upon promotion to the juryo division. However, he injured his elbow on the seventh day in this tournament in a match against Masatsukasa. Although the initial prognosis was that he would be out for six weeks, he returned to the tournament on Day 11 and finished with a 7–6–2 record. This was enough to keep him in the division, and he won the juryo division championship in November 2007 with a 13–2 record.

Sakaizawa was promoted to the top makuuchi division in March 2008, only twelve tournaments after his professional debut, which at the time was equal to the second fastest rise to the top division since the introduction of the 6 tournaments a year system in 1958. However, he had to withdraw on the seventh day of his debut tournament after suffering injuries to his knees and an ankle in a bout with Kakizoe. He was hit by a hard face slap (harite) from Kakizoe following a matta or false start and appeared to briefly lose consciousness. This was to prove to be his only tournament in the top division. Having been unable to train properly he turned in a poor 3–12 record at juryo 5 in May 2008 and was relegated back to the makushita division. However he returned to juryo in November 2008.

Sakaizawa was ordered to retire by the Japan Sumo Association in April 2011 after being found guilty of match-fixing. He protested his innocence, saying "I didn't get a chance to explain anything... I guess it was all decided in advance. I cannot accept this!" However, he eventually submitted his retirement papers, and had his hair-cutting ceremony (danpatsu-shiki) in September 2011.

Sakaizawa is only the third wrestler to have to withdraw from his only tournament ranked in the top division, after Kenrokuzan in May 1926 (0-0-11) and Towanoyama in March 2002 (0–1–14).

== After sumo ==
In April 2012 Sakaizawa was employed in sales at a publisher in Saitama Prefecture.

== Fighting style ==
Sakaizawa was a yotsu-sumo specialist who preferred grappling techniques to pushing or thrusting. His favoured grip on his opponent's mawashi or belt was migi-yotsu, a left hand outside, right hand inside position. His most common winning kimarite was a straightforward yori-kiri, or push out. Despite his large size he was known for his supple physique.

== Career record ==
Sakaizawa Kenichi
Year	January Hatsu basho, Tokyo	March Haru basho, Osaka	May Natsu basho, Tokyo	July Nagoya basho, Nagoya	September Aki basho, Tokyo	November Kyūshū basho, Fukuoka
2006	x	(Maezumo)	West Jonokuchi #16; 7–0; Champion	West Jonidan #21; 7–0–P	West Sandanme #27; 6–1	West Makushita #46; 6–1
2007	West Makushita #19; 7–0; Champion	West Makushita #2; 5–2	East Makushita #1; 5–2	West Jūryō #10; 7–6–2	West Jūryō #11; 7–8	East Jūryō #13; 13–2; Champion
2008	East Jūryō #3; 9–6	West Maegashira #15; 3–5–7	East Jūryō #9; 3–12	East Makushita #6; 4–3	West Makushita #3; 5–2	East Jūryō #9; 9–6
2009	East Jūryō #5; 6–9	East Jūryō #10; 10–5	West Jūryō #3; 6–9	East Jūryō #8; 5–4–6	East Jūryō #14; 9–6	West Jūryō #7; 6–9
2010	West Jūryō #12; 10–5	East Jūryō #5; 5–10	West Jūryō #8; 8–7	East Jūryō #7; 7–8	West Jūryō #7; 7–8	East Jūryō #9; 10–5
2011	West Jūryō #3; 7–8	West Jūryō #4; Tournament Cancelled; Match fixing investigation 0–0–0	West Jūryō #4; Retired –	x	x	x
Record given as wins–losses–absences Top division champion Top division runner-up Retired Lower divisions Non-participation Sanshō key: F=Fighting spirit; O=Outstanding performance; T=Technique Also shown: ★=Kinboshi; P=Playoff(s); Divisions: Makuuchi — Jūryō — Makushita — Sandanme — Jonidan — Jonokuchi Makuuchi ranks: Yokozuna — Ōzeki — Sekiwake — Komusubi — Maegashira

== See also ==
- List of sumo tournament second division champions
- Glossary of sumo terms
- List of past sumo wrestlers
