= Takahiro Tanaka =

Takahiro Tanaka may refer to:

- Takahiro Tanaka (footballer) (田中 貴大, born 1993), Japanese footballer
- Takahiro Tanaka (skier) (田中 隆博, born 1962), Japanese Nordic combined skier
