= Takahiro Yoshikawa =

Japanese pianist

Takahiro Yoshikawa 吉川 隆弘
- Born: Nishinomiya, Hyōgo Prefecture, Japan
- Genres: Classical
- Occupation: Pianist
- Instrument: Piano
- Website: www.takahiroyoshikawa.com/en/

Takahiro Yoshikawa (吉川 隆弘, Yoshikawa Takahiro) is a Japanese classical pianist. He is a regular piano soloist at La Scala, Italy's leading opera house.

== Life ==
Takahiro Yoshikawa (born November 8, 1973) grew up in Nishinomiya. Both of his parents are classical musicians.

== Personal life ==
Takahiro Yoshikawa is married to an Italian and has two children.

== Career ==
Yoshikawa started playing the piano at a young age. He graduated at the music department of the Tokyo University of the Arts under the guidance of Takako Horie. During his tenancy in Tokyo, he frequently travelled to Europe to complete a masterclass by German pianist Conrad Hansen. After completing his Master in Tokyo in 1999, he won the Bösendorfer Award by the famous Austrian piano manufacturer from Vienna shortly before moving permanently to Europe to complete his studies at the academy of La Scala.

In the years after, he continued his studies in Italy learning from Anita Porrini (herself a student of famous pianist Alfred Cortot) as well as attending courses to master the art of composition by Silvia Bianchera Bettinelli.

Since 2011, Yoshikawa has received acknowledgement for frequent performances in Italy at La Scala as soloist and for accompanying the La Scala Theatre Ballet for performances in Japan broadcast nationally by NHK, the public broadcasting corporation of Japan.

In 2015, Deutsche Grammophon released a classical record with duets of Fabrizio Meloni, the clarinet soloist of La Scala, and Yoshikawa. They subsequently toured together in Japan and Italy. Following the collaboration with Meloni, he published a record expanding his interpretation of works by composer Claude Debussy and received a positive critic by WCRB.

In 2019, he was referenced for the first time with a favorable review in the American Record Guide for his performance of Liszt on a Steinway C-227 piano.

== Discography ==
Vif et rythmique (In collaboration with Fabrizio Meloni)

- Released: 2015
- Format: CD
- Label: Deutsche Grammophon
- Writer: Claude Debussy, Camille Saint-Saëns, Francis Poulenc
- Tracks: 14

Takahiro Yoshikawa - Ludwig van Beethoven

- Released: 2015
- Format: CD
- Label: Ypsilon International Limited
- Writer: Ludwig van Beethoven
- Tracks: 14

Takahiro Yoshikawa - Claude Debussy

- Released: 2016
- Format: CD
- Label: Ypsilon International Limited
- Writer: Claude Debussy
- Tracks: 13

Takahiro Yoshikawa - Robert Schumann

- Released: 2017
- Format: CD
- Label: Ypsilon International Limited
- Writer: Robert Schumann
- Tracks: 3

Takahiro Yoshikawa - Wolfgang Amadeus Mozart (Steinway & Sons C-227 n. 584042 used)

- Released: 2019
- Format: CD
- Label: Ypsilon International Limited
- Writer: Wolfgang Amadeus Mozart
- Tracks: 8

Takahiro Yoshikawa - Franz Liszt (Recorded in March 2016 at the Istituto Italiano di Cultura & Tokyo, Auditorium Umberto Agnelli)

- Released: 2019
- Format: CD
- Label: Ypsilon International Limited
- Writer: Franz Liszt
- Tracks: 11
