= Magical Girl Site =

Japanese manga and anime series

- Front cover of volume 1 featuring Aya Asagiri as a "magical girl"

魔法少女サイト (Mahō Shōjo Saito)
- Genre: Dark fantasy; Magical girl; Supernatural
- Manga
- Written by: Kentarō Satō
- Published by: Akita Shoten
- English publisher: NA: Seven Seas Entertainment
- Imprint: Shōnen Champion Comics
- Magazine: Champion Tap!; (July 4, 2013 – October 5, 2017); Weekly Shōnen Champion; (October 26, 2017 – August 1, 2019)
- Original run: July 4, 2013 – August 1, 2019
- Volumes: 16
- Manga

Magical Girl Site Sept
- Written by: Kentarō Satō
- Illustrated by: Toshinori Sogabe
- Published by: Akita Shoten
- Magazine: Champion Tap!
- Original run: October 26, 2017 – August 23, 2018
- Volumes: 2
- Anime television series
- Directed by: Tadahito Matsubayashi
- Produced by: Yoshinori Takeeda; Kazuaki Takahashi; Gōta Aijima; Kazuto Matsumura; Asami Komatsu; Satoshi Kubota; Sōri Nakazawa
- Written by: Takayo Ikami
- Music by: Keiji Inai
- Studio: production doA
- Licensed by: NA: Sentai Filmworks
- Original network: JNN (MBS, TBS, BS-TBS, SBS, ATV), AT-X
- Original run: April 6, 2018 – June 22, 2018
- Episodes: 12
- icon

Magical Girl Site (Japanese: 魔法少女サイト, Hepburn: Mahō Shōjo Saito) is a Japanese magical girl manga series written and illustrated by Kentarō Satō. It is a spin-off of Magical Girl Apocalypse. The series is about a severely tormented, abused and suicidal high school student named Aya, who gains the ability to become a magical girl through a mysterious website. She soon finds friends, who are also magical girls like herself, that provide her strength. Aya and her friends also face enemies. The series becomes a climactic race for Aya because she must keep herself and her friends alive. It was serialized on Akita Shoten's Champion Tap! website from July 2013 to October 2017 and later in the shōnen manga magazine Weekly Shōnen Champion from October 2017 to August 2019, with its chapters collected in sixteen tankōbon volumes. The manga is licensed for English release in North America by Seven Seas. An anime television series adaptation produced by production doA aired from April to June 2018.

== Plot ==
Aya Asagiri is a high school girl who has problems both at school with almost lethal bullying and at home from her brother Kaname's physical abuse. One day a suspicious website pops up on her computer screen, showing a creepy-looking person. This person appears to take pity on her and announces that she will grant Aya magical powers. Later at school, Aya finds a gun that mysteriously appears in her locker. She is soon cornered by bullies and with nothing to lose, Aya fires the gun at them. The shot causes the bullies to disappear, but to her horror she finds out that they have somehow been killed by a train nearby. Aya feels as though she had somehow killed them, and is confused to find herself with longer red hair and blood flowing out of her eyes. She later finds out that she is not alone, when a classmate reveals that she is also a magical girl. The classmate, known as Tsuyuno Yatsumura, becomes one of her new friends, while offering to help her get away from "magical hunters" who kill magical girls and only steal their wands. Tsuyuno teaches Aya about the power she has acquired and the physical changes it brings on to her body. However, the two girls do not know the reason for something that resembles a countdown clock on the website, and they fear it may be something really bad. After meeting a group of other fellow magical girls, all with different powers and abilities of their own, Tsuyuno and Aya attempt to discover what the countdown really means, all while trying to make sure no one knows about their powers.

== Media ==
=== Manga ===
Magical Girl Site is written and illustrated by Kentarō Satō. The series ran on Akita Shoten's Champion Tap! website from July 4, 2013, to October 5, 2017. The series was then transferred to the publisher's shōnen manga magazine Weekly Shōnen Champion, where it ran from October 26, 2017, to August 1, 2019. Akita Shoten collected its 139 individual chapters in sixteen tankōbon volumes, released from March 7, 2014, to October 8, 2019.

In North America, the series is licensed by Seven Seas Entertainment, who announced the acquisition in July 2016.

A spin-off series, titled Magical Girl Site Sept (魔法少女サイトSept, Mahō Shōjo Saito Sept), ran on Champion Tap! from October 26, 2017, to August 23, 2018.

==== Volume list ====
No.	Original release date	Original ISBN	English release date	English ISBN
1	March 7, 2014	978-4-253-22401-7	February 21, 2017	978-1-626924-76-5
2	September 8, 2014	978-4-253-22402-4	May 2, 2017	978-1-626924-84-0
3	March 6, 2015	978-4-253-22403-1	August 1, 2017	978-1-626925-16-8
4	November 6, 2015	978-4-253-22404-8	November 7, 2017	978-1-626925-80-9
5	April 8, 2016	978-4-253-22405-5	February 13, 2018	978-1-626926-90-5
6	September 8, 2016	978-4-253-22406-2	May 15, 2018	978-1-626927-82-7
7	September 8, 2017	978-4-253-22407-9	September 25, 2018	978-1-626928-97-8
8	January 5, 2018	978-4-253-22408-6	March 5, 2019	978-1-626929-82-1
9	March 8, 2018	978-4-253-22409-3	May 28, 2019	978-1-642750-82-9
10	May 8, 2018	978-4-253-22410-9	September 17, 2019	978-1-642757-00-2
11	August 8, 2018	978-4-253-22411-6	January 21, 2020	978-1-645051-87-9
12	November 8, 2018	978-4-253-22412-3	June 2, 2020	978-1-645054-82-5
13	February 8, 2019	978-4-253-22413-0	November 24, 2020	978-1-645057-39-0
14	May 8, 2019	978-4-253-22414-7	April 6, 2021	978-1-645058-31-1
15	August 8, 2019	978-4-253-22415-4	June 29, 2021	978-1-645059-94-3
16	October 8, 2019	978-4-253-22416-1	November 23, 2021	978-1-648272-33-2

=== Anime ===
On September 8, 2017, an anime television adaptation was announced in the seventh volume of the manga. The series premiered on MBS, TBS and BS-TBS on April 7, 2018 (Note: The show lists April 6 at 26:55, which is after midnight on April 7, 2018.) and is directed by Tadahito Matsubayashi at production doA, with Takayo Ikami writing the scripts. The series is streaming on Amazon Prime Video worldwide. Keiji Inai is composing the music. The idol unit i☆Ris performed the opening theme song "Changing point", while Haruka Yamazaki performed the ending theme song "Zenzen Tomodachi" (ゼンゼントモダチ). Sentai Filmworks have licensed the anime and will release it in both digital and home video formats.

==== Episode list ====
No.	Title	Original release date
1	"Magical Girl Site" "Mahō Shōjo Saito" (魔法少女サイト)	April 7, 2018
At a railway as a train passes by, time suddenly stops. Aya and Yatsumura appear. They see a site admin, frozen in time, in front of the train. Months earlier, Aya attempts to kill herself by walking in front of the train, but she stops herself. At school, she is bullied by three girls in her class. When going home, she visits a stray kitten living under a bridge she is taking care of. At home, she gets abused by her brother Kaname. Once he leaves, her computer lights up and the Mahou Shojo site appears on screen. After calling her unfortunate, it says it will give Aya a magical power, but she turns the computer off. The next day, Aya learns that the kitten was killed. At school, she finds a "toy gun" with a heart barrel in her shoe locker. Afterwards, she is bullied by the three girls again, this time with the help of a guy named Shota who wants to rape her. Aya manages to escape but Shota and Erika find her, and she shoots them with the toy gun and they seemingly disappear. Aya then hears screams. At the train station, Erika and Shota had been run over. Feeling guilty, Aya goes home and stays in her room. The following day after school, another one of the bullies, Sarina, attempts to take revenge on Aya. Sarina blames Aya for Erika's and Shota's death. When Sarina holds and is about to cut Aya's tongue with a box cutter, time stops. Yatsumura enters the bathroom and slits Sarina's throat with the cutter. She then asks Aya to come with her.
2	"Tempest" "Tenpesuto" (テンペスト)	April 14, 2018
Yatsumura tells Aya she is also a magical girl and takes her home. She tells her that using her powers shortens her lifespan and that a "Magical Hunter" is killing magical girls to steal their magical artifacts, and that her friend Rina went missing while investigating him. She also stays all night in Aya's bedroom, protecting her from her brother's abuse. The next day, the Hunter attacks Aya, but Yatsumura convinces her to use her weapon. They discover where Aya's weapon has sent the Hunter and Yatsumura realizes the Hunter is Rina herself. She tells them that she has been killing other magical girls because she wants to survive to the end. Yatsumura forces her to explain, and Rina says that she met the website's manager who told her about a secret page with a countdown to an event called the Tempest, to happen on 07:23 August 11, that will destroy this world and open the door to a new one.
3	"The Princess and the Poison Apple" "Doku ringo to ohime-sama" (毒りんごとお姫さま)	April 21, 2018
Rina has fallen into a coma. Aya gets the idea to find a magical girl who could heal her so she could tell them what she knows. Yatsumura finds her Slaughter Notebook, which has photos of other magical girls, and they realize one of them is Nijimi, an idol from the Inu Asobi group. Nijimi invites them to her home, when they discover her power is mind control and that her best friend, also a magical girl, was killed by Rina. Aya and Yatsumura go to visit Rina at the hospital, where Sarina overhears them talking about magical girls. Kaname, who is getting angsty because he is unable to use his sister as punching bag, discovers the magical girl site on her browser's history.
4	"The Successor and the Transfer Student" "Kōkeisha to tenkōsei" (後継者と転校生)	April 28, 2018
Magical girl website manager Nana gives Sarina a magical artifact so she can become the next Magical Hunter, following in Rina's footsteps. Yatsumura asks Aya why Sarina and her friends bully her, and Aya explains that is because her social shyness made her unable to thank Sarina for her help when she transferred to the school and Sarina became angry about it. Yatsumura tells Aya to stop blaming herself for it. Kaname thinks everyone else but him is trash, like his father who hits him when he does not get good enough grades. Sarina returns to school with revenge in mind. Nijimi temporary retires from music and transfers to Aya's school. After Yatsumura misses school, Aya goes to her apartment, where she discovers Yatsumura has a man prisoner. She explains that man killed her parents and promised to return to kill her when she was older. Once she got her magical artifact, she went after him in vengeance.
5	"Revenge and Resolve" "Fukushū to ketsui" (復讐と決意)	May 5, 2018
Aya promises an injured Yatsumura that she will never be alone anymore. Sarina appears and tells them that she told Nijimi where to find Rina. Sarina wants to kill them in revenge for Erica's death and the nasty scar on her neck, and attacks them, killing the assassin instead. At the hospital, Nijimi cannot kill Rina because Yatsumura took the precaution of using two of the magical artifacts as protection, but it is taking a toll on her. Aya and Sarina fight, with Aya decided to protect Yatsumura at any cost. Yatsumura's building crashes down, and Aya saves Sarina despite all the nasty things she has said. Detective Misumi arrives to investigate as the rescue workers find Aya and Yatsumura injured but still alive amidst the ruins thanks to an artifact's protection field. Nijimi works out Aya and Yatsumura lied to her about Rina. She goes to Aya's home and meets Kaname. A new magical girl enters Rina's room.
6	"Fake" "Feiku" (フェイク)	May 12, 2018
Nijimi falls for Kaname at first sight, while an obsessed fan stalks her. Kaname plans on using her to discover more about the magical girl site. While Nana observes, Kosame heals Rina by cutting herself. They visit Aya and Yatsumura, which Kosame has also healed. Kosame reveals that's she's a magical girl from another site of the several that exist and that she wants their help. She shows them the hidden information about the Tempest, which speaks about a King who feeds on humanity's negative energy, and that only the girls who hand out to the website a magical artifact full of negative energy on the day of the Tempest will survive. After realizing they've been lied to, they agree to help Kosame capture an administrator to find out the truth about the Tempest. The website administrators kill several girls who know too much. Later, Yatsumura thanks Aya for having given her another reason to live and Aya's parents agree to allow Yatsumura to stay.
7	"Joint Strategy" "Kyōtō senryaku" (共闘戦略)	May 19, 2018
Nijimi only agrees to help with the kidnapping if she can kill Rina first. Soon after, Rina appears in their class as a new transfer student, and Aya and Yatsumura have to act quickly to prevent Nijimi from killing her. Aya takes Nijimi's magical pants off and Yatsumura runs away and hides them. Aya, Yatsumura, Nijimi and Rina meet with the girls from the other magical site, Kosame, Kiyoharu, Asahi, Mikari and Sayuki. Nana warns Sarina to mind her own business. Rina also becomes a guest in Aya's house. Kosame calls Aya with disturbing news.
8	"Last Summer" "Saigo no natsu" (最後の夏)	May 26, 2018
The girls go to spend a day in the beach to enjoy themselves a bit, though Aya is worried because Kosame told her Yatsumura does not have much life left. Kaname, who has been told the truth by Nijimi, follows them and steals Nijimi's magical pants from the beach's lockers. Nijimi thinks he stole them for her. Nijimi's obsessed fan is also there to kill Kaname for defiling "his" Nijimi, but Kaname uses the pants' magic to force him to kill himself. Aya sees him, but doesn't tell the other girls, though Kiyoharu reads it on her mind on the way back. Detective Misumi is on the case, and finds a photo of the stalker with Kaname's name on it. The website managers meet: their king needs more dark energy for the Tempest.
9	"God Won't Abandon Me" "Kami wa boku o mihanasanai" (神は僕を見離さない)	June 2, 2018
The girls meet at Sayuki's home. Nijimi finds out Kaname is using the pants and sees his real self. He orders Nijimi to hang herself, but Asahi (controlled by Kiyoharu) saves her. However, due to a previous command, Nijimi tries to strangle Asahi, giving Kaname time to react and order Asahi to kill whoever is controlling her. Kosame tries to heal Kiyoharu's wound, but when her blood isn't enough, Aya uses Kosame's magical artifact to save Kiyoharu. Kaname attacks the girls at Sayuki's house, with a controlled Nijimi in tow. Kiyoharu manages to overcome Kaname's magic and free Nijimi's mind. Nijimi realizes it is her fault for falling for Kaname's deception and attacks him, but he strikes her with Sayuki's katana. Nijimi remembers how she got her artifact after her father hanged himself due to the money he owed to a loan shark. She regains consciousness, and severely injures Kaname in the neck with a broken crystal bottle. A mysterious invisible person stops him, but it is too late for Nijimi.
10	"Breaking" "Burekingu" (ブレキング)	June 9, 2018
Aya feels responsible for Nijimi's death. Yatsumura wonders who saved them and took Kaname away while they were unconscious. Detective Misumi is investigating Kaname's disappearance. Aya reacts and tries to find her magical artifact, but Sarina has it. The girls attend Nijimi's funeral. Aya appears and the building explodes. Misumi is revealed as Nana's co-conspirator and the one who took Kaname away. Nana thinks the girls are dead, but Aya transported them away before the explosion. They realize it was a murder attempt by the website managers. Sarina is also there, having switched sides. Aya wants the girls to give her their artifacts because she does not wants anyone else getting hurt. The girls refuse and Yatsumura makes her see reason. Sarina gives their magical artifacts back. She reveals Nana ordered her to kill them, but she is fed up with their manipulations. Together they decide to destroy the Magical Girls Site.
11	"The Rebel Girls" "Hangyaku no shoujotachi" (反逆の少女たち)	June 15, 2018
The girls ambush a manager when he comes to give a new girl her magical artifact. Aya, Yatsumura, Rina and Sarina kill the manager, who turns out to be a girl. On their way, Asahi, Sayuki and Kiyoharu are attacked by another manager. Kosame and Mikari arrive. Nana reveals herself, and Mikari leaves to help the other girls. Nana destroys Yatsumura's artifact, but Yatsumura protects the others with the barrier artifact, sacrificing herself in the process. On their side, the website managers welcome Yatsumura as a new candidate for manager.
12	"We Are..." "Watashitachiha…" (私たちは…)	June 22, 2018
The managers reveal to Yatsumura that the King is the most miserable girl in the world, a sorceress that will change the world by causing the Tempest, a global storm that will erase evil from the world, but kill those unable to adapt – that is, most of humankind. Aya transports Rina, Sarina and Kosame away. Yatsumura is reborn as a manager candidate and attacks Aya with great strength. Rina and Kosame heal Sarina while Mikari rescues Sayuki, who then destroys the admin that attacked them. Aya manages to transport herself and Yatsumura to the beach where, risking her own life, is able to make Yatsumura remember their friendship. Aya and Yatsumura decide that they are not miserable and defeat Nana. All the magical girls survive. In his secret lair, Misumi sodomizes Kaname. To the managers, Aya and Yatsumura's actions have tarnished the King's will, by taking responsibility of the evil in people's hearts and claiming that past misfortunes are responsible for today's happiness. Aya and Yatsumura promise themselves that nobody will take their happiness away while the angry king wishes them more misfortune.

== Reception ==
The English language version of Mahō Shōjo Saito (Magical Girl Site) has received various reviews from critics. Brittany Vincent from Japanator compared the series to Puella Magi Madoka Magica, calling the former "much darker". Vincent said that Magical Girl Site takes away everything someone may find dark about Madoka, and slices it "wide open" with its dark plot.

== See also ==
- Immortality and Punishment, another manga series by the same creator
