= Takahiro Yodogawa =

Japanese footballer

Personal information
- Full name: Takahiro Yodogawa
- Date of birth: 4 March 1951 (age 75)
- Height: 1.75 m (5 ft 9 in)
- Position: Goalkeeper

Youth career
- 1966–1968: Ashiya High School
- 1969–1972: Waseda University

Senior career*
Years	Team	Apps	(Gls)
1973–1981	Furukawa Electric	100	(0)
- * Club domestic league appearances and goals

Takahiro Yodogawa (淀川 隆博, Yodogawa Takahiro; born 4 March 1951) is a former Japanese football player. From 2004 to 2008, he was the president of Japanese football club JEF United Ichihara Chiba.
