= Fujiwara no Takaie =

Nobleman of the Heian Period

- 藤原 隆家
- Born: 979
- Died: February 2, 1044 (aged 65 or 66)
- Relatives: Father: Fujiwara no Michitaka; Mother: Takashina no Takako
- Military career
- Allegiance: Imperial House of Japan
- Rank: Senior Second Rank; Chūnagon
- Nickname: Childhood name: Ako (阿古)
- Conflicts: Toi invasion (1019)

Fujiwara no Takaie (藤原 隆家; 979 - February 2, 1044), was a Kugyō (Japanese noble) of the late Heian period. He was the Regional Governor of Dazaifu and is famous for repelling the Jurchen pirates during the Toi invasion in 1019. He reached the court position of Chūnagon.

== Early life and background ==
Takaie was born 979 into the Hokke branch of the powerful Fujiwara clan, the fourth son of Fujiwara no Michitaka. His mother was Takashina no Takako also known as Kō-no-Naishi (高内侍) or Gidō-sanshi no Haha (儀同三司母). His childhood name was Ako (阿古). His uncle was the powerful Fujiwara no Michinaga who represented the highpoint of the Fujiwara clan's control over the government of Japan holding the position of Daijō-daijin. His elder brother was Fujiwara no Korechika who was charged with treason but later pardoned. One of his sisters was the well-known empress consort of Emperor Ichijō, Fujiwara no Teishi.

== Career ==
- 989 (Eiso 1, 29th day of the 1st month): Junior Fifth Rank, Lower Grade (従五位下, ju go-i no ge). Also appointed to the Board of Chamberlains (侍従職, Jijū-shoku).
- 993 (Shōryaku 4, 10th day of the 3rd month): Middle Captain of the Right Division of Inner Palace Guards (右近衛中将, Ukone-no-chujo).
- 994 (Shōryaku 5, 28th day of the 8th month): Junior Third Rank (従三位, ju san-mi), joining the ranks of the Kugyō.
- 995 (Chōtoku 1, 6th day of the 4th month): After the death of his father he was appointed Chūnagon (中納言).
- 996 (Chōtoku 2, 24th day of the 4th month): His older brother Fujiwara no Korechika was charged with shooting an arrow at Retired Emperor Kazan, and performing an esoteric Shingon ceremony known as Daigensuihō (大元帥法), which was reserved solely for the emperor. Korechika was demoted to Dazai-gon-no-sochi (大宰権帥) and Takaie was demoted to Izumo-Gon-no-kami (出雲権守). This incident became known as Chōtoku no hen (長徳の変). They were pardoned the next year.
- 998 (Chōtoku 4, 23rd day of the 10th month): Appointed chief official of the Ministry of War (兵部卿, Hyōbu-kyō).
- 1002 (Chōhō 4, 24th day of the 9th month): Appointed Gon-Chūnagon (権中納言).
- 1007 (Kankō 4, 20th day of the 1st month): Junior Second Rank (従二位, ju ni-i) with the job of Travelling Inspector of the Provincial Governments (按察使, Azechi).
- 1014 (Chōwa 3, 7th day of the 11th month): Appointed as Regional Governor of Dazaifu (大宰権帥, Dazai-gon-no-sochi).
- 1015 (Chōwa 4, 21st day of the 4th month): Senior Second Rank (正二位, shō ni-i). He gradually returned to court society but his position ended with Chūnagon.
- 1019 (Kannin 3, 4th month): he had voluntarily asked Emperor Sanjō to go down to Kyūshū to Dazaifu to take up the position of Regional Governor of Dazaifu in order to receive treatment for an eye disease. Takaie successfully led the defense of Dazaifu against the Toi invasion of 1019. A rumor was circulated that the invading Toi (considered a Jurchen tribe) carried smallpox to mainland Japan and it began spreading upon Takaie's arrival in the capital. Takaie requested that his men be given rewards for their military contributions, and in response to his request, rules regarding local governments were discussed among high court officials.
- 1019 (Kannin 3, 12th month): He resigned from his post in Dazaifu, which was given to Fujiwara no Yukinari. Takaie returned to the capital.
- 1023 (Jian 3, 15th day of the 12th month): He declined the position of Chūnagon (中納言) so his second son, Fujiwara no Tsunesuke was promoted to Sachuben (左中弁) instead.
- 1037 (Chōryaku 1, 9th day of the 8th month): He again declined the position of Regional Governor of Dazaifu so it was given to Fujiwara no Sanenari (藤原実成).
- 1042 (Chōkyū 3, 29th day of the 1st month): Takaie retired.
- 1042 (Chōkyū 3, 29th day of the 1st month): Takaie died at 66 years of age with the ranks of Senior Second Rank (正二位, shō ni-i) and Zen-Chūnagon (前中納言).

== Legacy ==
The Kikuchi clan of Higo Province claim that their founder, Kikuchi Noritaka is a son of Fujiwara no Masanori and grandson of Takaie.

== Family ==
- Father: Fujiwara no Michitaka (藤原道隆, 953–995)
- Mother: Takashina no Takako (高階貴子, ?–996), also known as Kō-no-Naishi (高内侍)
  - Wife: name unknown, daughter of Minamoto no Shigenobu (源重信の娘)
  - Wife: name unknown, daughter of Fujiwara no Kagenari (藤原景斉の娘)
    - First son: Fujiwara no Yoshiyori (藤原良頼, 1002–1048)
  - Wife: name unknown, daughter of Minamoto no Kanesuke (源兼資の娘)
    - Second son: Fujiwara no Tsunesuke (藤原経輔, 1006–1081)
    - Daughter: name unknown, wife of Prince Atsunori (敦儀親王室)
    - Daughter: name unknown, wife of Fujiwara no Kanetsune (藤原兼経室)
  - Wife: name unknown, daughter of Fujiwara no Tamemitsu (藤原為光, 942–992)
    - Son: Fujiwara no Suesada (藤原季定)
  - Wife: name unknown, daughter of Kaga-no-kami Masamitsu (加賀守正光の娘)
    - Son: Fujiwara no Iefusa (藤原家房)
  - Children with unknown mothers:
    - Son: Fujiwara no Yoshikazu (藤原良員)
    - Son: Fujiwara no Motosada (藤原基定)
    - Son: Kōshō (行昭, 1015–1062), a priest (権律師) at Enryaku-ji.
    - Son: Ryūmyō (隆明, 1021–1104), a priest at Mii-dera.
    - Son: Fujiwara no Masanori (藤原政則, 997–1063), ancestor of the Kikuchi clan. Possibly a son of Chikanori (親則), a man who worked for Takaie.

== See also ==
- Fujiwara clan
- Kikuchi clan
- Dazaifu (government)
