= 996 =

Calendar year

996 in various calendars
- Gregorian calendar: 996; CMXCVI
- Ab urbe condita: 1749
- Armenian calendar: 445; ԹՎ ՆԽԵ
- Assyrian calendar: 5746
- Balinese saka calendar: 917–918
- Bengali calendar: 402–403
- Berber calendar: 1946
- Buddhist calendar: 1540
- Burmese calendar: 358
- Byzantine calendar: 6504–6505
- Chinese calendar: 乙未年 (Wood Goat); 3693 or 3486 — to — 丙申年 (Fire Monkey); 3694 or 3487
- Coptic calendar: 712–713
- Discordian calendar: 2162
- Ethiopian calendar: 988–989
- Hebrew calendar: 4756–4757
- Hindu calendars
- Vikram Samvat: 1052–1053
- Shaka Samvat: 917–918
- Kali Yuga: 4096–4097
- Holocene calendar: 10996
- Iranian calendar: 374–375
- Islamic calendar: 385–386
- Japanese calendar: Chōtoku 2 (長徳２年)
- Javanese calendar: 897–898
- Julian calendar: 996; CMXCVI
- Korean calendar: 3329
- Minguo calendar: 916 before ROC 民前916年
- Nanakshahi calendar: −472
- Seleucid era: 1307/1308 AG
- Thai solar calendar: 1538–1539
- Tibetan calendar: ཤིང་མོ་ལུག་ལོ་ (female Wood-Sheep); 1122 or 741 or −31 — to — མེ་ཕོ་སྤྲེ་ལོ་ (male Fire-Monkey); 1123 or 742 or −30

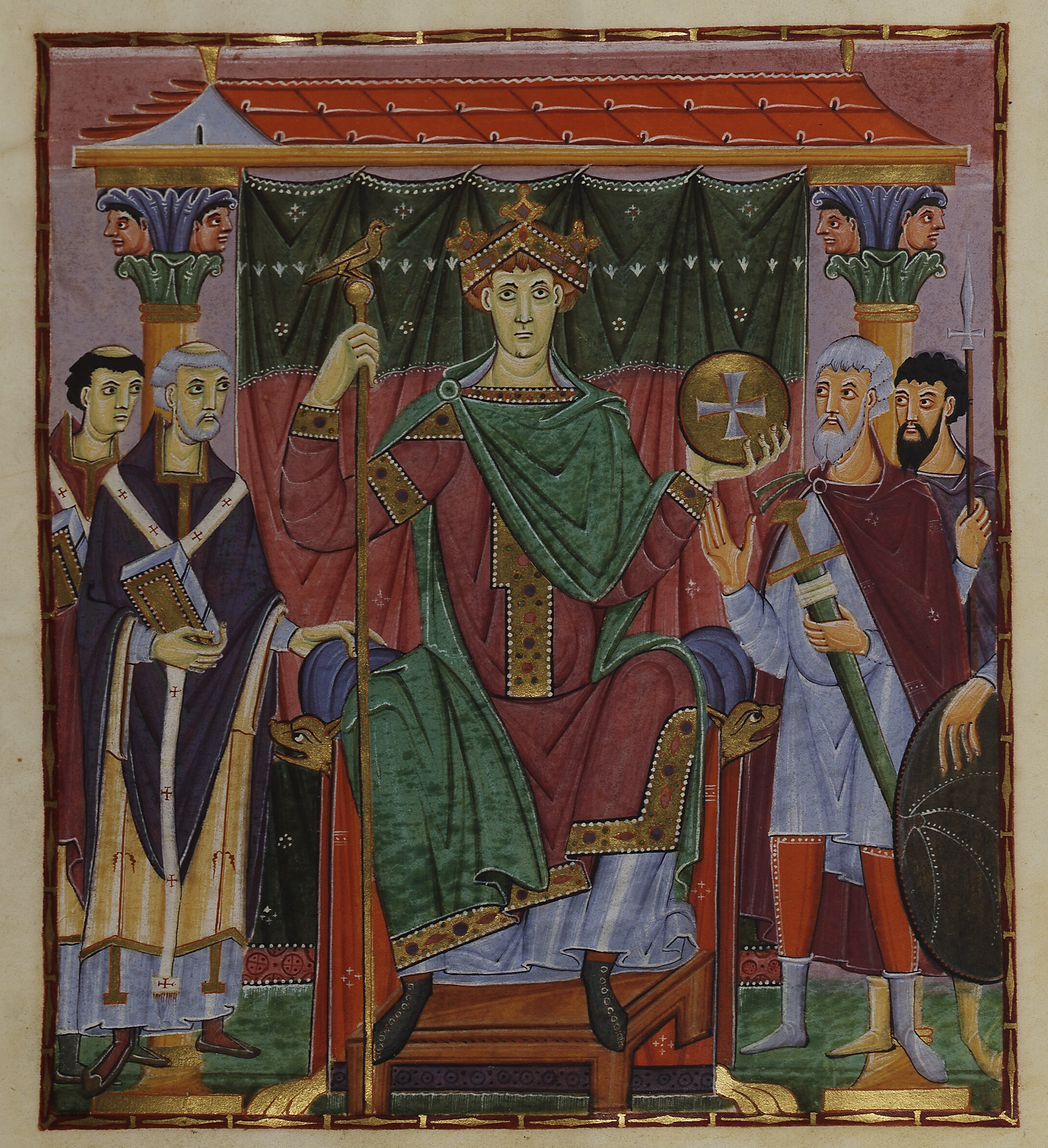
Otto III is crowned Holy Roman Emperor.

Year 996 (CMXCVI) was a leap year starting on Wednesday of the Julian calendar.

== Events ==
=== By place ===
==== Europe ====
- Spring – King Otto III starts his first expedition to Italy from Regensburg, and proceeds over the Brenner Pass. News of Otto's arrival prompts Crescentius II (the Younger), patrician (the de facto ruler) of Rome, to invite Pope John XV (exiled in Tuscany) back to Rome. Otto arrives in Verona, and receives ambassadors of Doge Pietro II Orseolo of Venice.
- May 21 – Otto III, 16, is crowned Emperor of the Holy Roman Empire at St. Peter's Basilica, and claims also the title of King of Italy. His grandmother, Adelaide, retires to a convent she has founded at Seltz (Alsace). Otto puts down a Roman rebellion; a number of nobles (including Crescentius II) are banished for their crimes.
- October 24 – King Hugh I Capet dies in Paris after a 9-year reign and is interred in the Basilica of St. Denis. He is succeeded by his 24-year-old son Robert II (the Pious) as king of France. Robert tries (during his reign) to increase his power, by pressing his claim of feudal lands that become vacant. This results in many territorial disputes.
- November 1 – Otto III grants the Bavarian bishopric of Freising 30 "royal hides" of land (about 800 hectares, or 2,000 acres - 800 hectares is 2,000 acres) in Neuhofen an der Ybbs (Lower Austria). A document (the oldest known) marks the first use of the name Ostarrîchi, meaning "Eastern Realm" (Austria in Old High German).
- November 20 – Richard I (the Fearless), duke of Normandy, dies after a 55-year reign. He is succeeded by his young son Richard II. During his minority, Rodulf of Ivry (his uncle), who wields the power as regent puts down a peasants revolt at the beginning of Richard's reign.

==== Africa ====
- May 15 – The new Fatimid navy is destroyed by fire, resulting in anti-Christian pogroms in Cairo.
- October 14 – Caliph Al-Aziz Billah dies at Bilbeis in Egypt after a 21-year reign in which he has expanded his Shiite caliphate at the expense of the Byzantines, using Turkish mercenaries (Mamelukes). He is succeeded by his 11-year-old son Al-Hakim bi-Amr Allah as ruler of the Fatimid Caliphate (until 1021).
- Revolt of Tyre: The citizens of Tyre (modern Lebanon) revolt against the Fatimid Caliphate. Al-Hakim bi-Amr Allah sends an expeditionary army and navy to blockade the city by land and sea.

==== Asia ====
Japan

- February - Chotoku Incident: Fujiwara no Korechika and Takaie shoot an arrow at Retired Emperor Kazan.
- March 2: Emperor Ichijo orders the imperial police to raid Korechika's residence; Empress Teishi (sister of Korechika) cuts her hair because of the humiliation; Takaie is arrested, Korechika is absent.
- March 5: Korechika returns with his head shaven and attired as a monk.

China

- The Niujie Mosque is constructed in Beijing during the Liao Dynasty. The first mosque is built under supervision of the Muslim architect Nazaruddin.

Vietnam

- Emperor Lê Đại Hành personally led a campaign to conquer four tribes Đại, Phát, Đan and Ba in Ma Hoàng. The tribes were defeated and their lands then belonged to the Early Lê dynasty.
- In July, a rebellion broke out in Đỗ Động Giang and was quickly quelled by the emperor.
- Following the border conflict with the Song in 995, Guangxi authorities arrested Bốc Văn Dũng, a political criminal to the Early Lê dynasty, along with his followers for extradition to Đại Cồ Việt. In return, emperor Lê Đại Hành extradited the captured pirates to the Guangxi authorities and agreed to make peace with the Song dynasty.

=== By topic ===
==== Religion ====
- April 1 – Pope John XV dies of fever after an 11-year reign. Meeting a Roman embassy at Ravenna, Otto appoints his cousin Bruno of Carinthia (a grandson of the late Emperor Otto I), who duly ascends as Gregory V. He becomes the 138th pope – and the first German pope of the Catholic Church.

== Births ==
- July 29 – Fujiwara no Norimichi, Japanese nobleman (d. 1075)
- Drogo of Mantes, count of Valois and the Vexin (d. 1035)
- Elvira Menéndez, queen consort of León (approximate date)
- Oda of Meissen, queen consort of Poland (approximate date)

== Deaths ==
- March 12 – Odo I of Blois (Eudes), French nobleman
- April 1 – John XV, pope of the Catholic Church
- October 14 – Al-Aziz Billah, Fatimid caliph (b. 955)
- October 24 – Hugh I Capet, king of France (b. 941)
- November 20 – Richard I, duke of Normandy (b. 932)
- Abu Talib al-Makki, Shafi'i jurist and hadith scholar
- Li Fang, Chinese scholar and encyclopedist (b. 925)
- Gilla Pátraic mac Donnchada, king of Osraige (Ireland)
- Herman I, Count Palatine of Lotharingia (the Slender), German nobleman (b. 945)
- Ibn Abi Zayd, Muslim imam and scholar (b. 922)
- Ki no Tokibumi, Japanese waka poet (b. 922)
- Strachkvas, Bohemian prince and chronicler
- Takashina no Takako, Japanese female poet
