= 1010 =

Calendar year

1010 in various calendars
- Gregorian calendar: 1010; MX
- Ab urbe condita: 1763
- Armenian calendar: 459; ԹՎ ՆԾԹ
- Assyrian calendar: 5760
- Balinese saka calendar: 931–932
- Bengali calendar: 416–417
- Berber calendar: 1960
- English Regnal year: N/A
- Buddhist calendar: 1554
- Burmese calendar: 372
- Byzantine calendar: 6518–6519
- Chinese calendar: 己酉年 (Earth Rooster); 3707 or 3500 — to — 庚戌年 (Metal Dog); 3708 or 3501
- Coptic calendar: 726–727
- Discordian calendar: 2176
- Ethiopian calendar: 1002–1003
- Hebrew calendar: 4770–4771
- Hindu calendars
- Vikram Samvat: 1066–1067
- Shaka Samvat: 931–932
- Kali Yuga: 4110–4111
- Holocene calendar: 11010
- Igbo calendar: 10–11
- Iranian calendar: 388–389
- Islamic calendar: 400–401
- Japanese calendar: Kankō 7 (寛弘７年)
- Javanese calendar: 912–913
- Julian calendar: 1010; MX
- Korean calendar: 3343
- Minguo calendar: 902 before ROC 民前902年
- Nanakshahi calendar: −458
- Seleucid era: 1321/1322 AG
- Thai solar calendar: 1552–1553
- Tibetan calendar: ས་མོ་བྱ་ལོ་ (female Earth-Bird); 1136 or 755 or −17 — to — ལྕགས་ཕོ་ཁྱི་ལོ་ (male Iron-Dog); 1137 or 756 or −16

Year 1010 (MX) was a common year starting on Sunday of the Julian calendar.

== Events ==
=== By place ===
==== Africa ====
- The Nile river in Egypt freezes over.
- Egyptian military commander Zar'ah ibn Isa ibn Nasturus appointed Vizier of Egypt.

==== Asia ====
- Emperor Lý Thái Tổ of the Lý dynasty moved the capital from Hoa Lư to Thăng Long (modern-day Hanoi).
- Second conflict in the Goryeo–Khitan War: The Goryeo king is unseated in a revolt, resulting in an invasion by the Liao dynasty, and the burning of the Korean capital Gaegyeong.
- Song Zhun of Song dynasty China completes the work of the earlier geographer Lu Duosun, an enormous atlas of China that is written and illustrated in 1,556 chapters, showing maps of each region, city, town, and village (the atlas took 39 years to complete).
- In the Chola dynasty of southern India, the first votes are celebrated by adding a ballot in an urn.

==== Japan ====
- January – Fujiwara no Kenshi (daughter of Michinaga) is married to the imperial heir Crown Prince Okisada.
- February 14 – On the death of Fujiwara no Korechika his daughter, the poet Fujiwara no Chikako, becomes a lady-in-waiting to Empress Shōshi.
- Emperor Ichijō wants to retire – the influential statesman Fujiwara no Michinaga supports Crown Prince Okisada (now his son-in-law), who will be the successor, but the emperor prefers his eldest son by the late Empress Teishi, Prince Atsuyasu, who has been raised by Empress Shōshi, who also supports her stepson, leading to conflict at court.

==== Americas ====
- Viking explorer Thorfinn Karlsefni attempts to found a settlement in North America (approximate date).

==== Europe ====
- June 2 – Fitna of al-Andalus – Battle of Aqbat al-Bakr: The Caliphate of Córdoba is defeated. Allied to Muslim rebels, Ramon Borrell, Count of Barcelona sacks Córdoba, and Hisham II the Nephast is restored as Umayyad caliph of Córdoba, succeeding Muhammad II al-Mahdi.
- The Russian city of Yaroslavl is founded, as an outpost of the principality of Rostov Veliky.
- The fortified city of Fiesole in Italy is captured and destroyed by the people of nearby Florence.
- Swedish king Olof Skötkonung gives city rights to Sigtuna.

=== By topic ===
==== Architecture ====
- The construction of 217 ft (66 m) tall Brihadisvara Temple in Thanjavur (a city now in Tamil Nadu, India) is completed during the Chola dynasty, and at about this time the wall painting Rajaraja I and His Teacher

==== Literature ====
- March 8 – Persian poet Ferdowsi finishes writing the Shahnameh (Book of Kings), which will be regarded as the national epic of the greater Iranian culture.
- Lady Murasaki writes The Tale of Genji in Japanese (approximate date).
- Beowulf is written anonymously in Old English (approximate date).

==== Technology ====
- Eilmer of Malmesbury in England attempts flight in a glider of his own construction.

== Births ==
- May 30 – Zhao Zhen, Emperor Renzong of the Song dynasty (d. 1063)
- Adalbero, bishop of Würzburg (approximate date)
- Adalbero III of Luxembourg, German nobleman (d. 1072)
- Akkadevi, princess of the Chalukya dynasty (d. 1064)
- Anno II, archbishop of Cologne (approximate date)
- Arialdo, Italian nobleman and deacon (approximate date)
- Benno, bishop of Meissen (approximate date)
- Eberhard, archbishop of Trier (approximate date)
- Eleanor of Normandy, countess of Flanders (d. 1077)
- Gebhard, archbishop of Salzburg (approximate date)
- Gomes Echigues, Portuguese knight and governor (d. 1065)
- Honorius II, antipope of the Catholic Church (approximate date)
- John V of Gaeta, Italian nobleman (approximate date)
- Michael IV the Paphlagonian, Byzantine emperor (d. 1041)
- Odo (or Eudes), Gascon nobleman (approximate date)
- Otloh of Sankt Emmeram, German monk (approximate date)
- Siegfried I, German nobleman (approximate date)
- Tunka Manin, ruler of the Ghana Empire (d. 1078)

== Deaths ==
- February 14 – Fujiwara no Korechika, Japanese nobleman (b. 974)
- Ælfric of Eynsham, English abbot and scholar (approximate date)
- Abu'l-Nasr Muhammad, Farighunid ruler (approximate date)
- Aimoin, French monk and chronicler (approximate date)
- Aisha, Andalusian poet and writer (approximate date)
- Cathal mac Conchobar mac Taidg, king of Connacht
- Ermengol I (or Armengol), count of Urgell (b. 974)
- John Kourkouas, Byzantine catepan (approximate date)
- Maelsuthan Ua Cerbhail, Irish advisor and chronicler
- Vijayanandi, Indian mathematician (approximate date)

== Sources ==
- Boissonade, B. (1934). "Les premières croisades françaises en Espagne. Normands, Gascons, Aquitains et Bourguignons (1018-1032)". Bulletin Hispanique. 36 (1): 5–28. doi:10.3406/hispa.1934.2607.
- Lamb, H. H. (2012) [1977]. Climate: Present, Past and Future: Climatic History and the Future. Vol. 2. London: Methuen and Co. / Routledge. ISBN 978-0415682237.
- Ngô Sĩ Liên (1993). Đại Việt sử ký toàn thư, Basic Annals (PDF) (in Vietnamese). Vol. II, Kỷ nhà Lý: Thái Tổ Hoàng Đế (Nội các quan bản ed.). Hanoi: Social Science Publishing House.
