= AD 999 =

Calendar year

999 in various calendars
- Gregorian calendar: 999; CMXCIX
- Ab urbe condita: 1752
- Armenian calendar: 448; ԹՎ ՆԽԸ
- Assyrian calendar: 5749
- Balinese saka calendar: 920–921
- Bengali calendar: 405–406
- Berber calendar: 1949
- Buddhist calendar: 1543
- Burmese calendar: 361
- Byzantine calendar: 6507–6508
- Chinese calendar: 戊戌年 (Earth Dog); 3696 or 3489 — to — 己亥年 (Earth Pig); 3697 or 3490
- Coptic calendar: 715–716
- Discordian calendar: 2165
- Ethiopian calendar: 991–992
- Hebrew calendar: 4759–4760
- Hindu calendars
- Vikram Samvat: 1055–1056
- Shaka Samvat: 920–921
- Kali Yuga: 4099–4100
- Holocene calendar: 10999
- Iranian calendar: 377–378
- Islamic calendar: 389–390
- Japanese calendar: Chōtoku 5 / Chōhō 1 (長保元年)
- Javanese calendar: 900–901
- Julian calendar: 999; CMXCIX
- Korean calendar: 3332
- Minguo calendar: 913 before ROC 民前913年
- Nanakshahi calendar: −469
- Seleucid era: 1310/1311 AG
- Thai solar calendar: 1541–1542
- Tibetan calendar: ས་ཕོ་ཁྱི་ལོ་ (male Earth-Dog); 1125 or 744 or −28 — to — ས་མོ་ཕག་ལོ་ (female Earth-Boar); 1126 or 745 or −27

Year 999 (CMXCIX) was a common year starting on Sunday of the Julian calendar.

== Events ==
=== By place ===
==== Europe ====
- King Bermudo II abdicates in favor of his 5-year-old son Alfonso V as ruler of León. Moorish invaders have forced Bermudo to recognize the suzerainty of their leader, Umayyad vizier and the de facto ruler Al-Mansur.
- September 9 (999 or 1000) – Battle of Svolder: A Norwegian fleet, commanded by Olaf Tryggvason in his longship Ormrinn langi, is defeated by the combined fleet of the Danish king Sweyn Forkbeard and his Swedish counterpart Olof Skötkonung, resulting in Tryggvason's death, and the splitting up of Norway between Sweden and Denmark.

Ireland

- December 30 – Battle of Glenmama: The combined forces of Munster and Meath under Brian Boru (High King of Ireland) inflict a crushing defeat on the allied armies of Leinster and Dublin near Lyons Hill (County Kildare).

==== Africa ====
- Egyptian military commander Abu'l-Ala Fahd ibn Ibrahim appointed Vizier of Egypt.

==== Asia ====
Central Asia

- The Karakhanids invade from north of the Syr Darya river, ending the Samanid Empire (modern Uzbekistan). The Samanid domains are split between the Ghaznavid Dynasty and the Karakhanids.

Japan

- February 9 – The Mogi Ceremony of Fujiwara no Shoshi is held (she later becomes empress).
- December – Empress Teishi gives birth to Prince Atsuyasu (who becomes the imperial heir), but on the next day, her rival, Fujiwara no Shoshi, is promoted to Consort.

Vietnam

- Emperor Lê Đại Hành personally led a campaign to conquer a total of 49 tribes in Hà Động. The Nhật Tắc tribe and others in Định Biên province were defeated, while the remaining tribes capitulated to the emperor.

=== By topic ===
==== Religion ====
- February 18 – Pope Gregory V dies after a 3-year pontificate in which the Crescentii family forced him to flee Rome. He is succeeded by Sylvester II as the 139th pope of the Catholic Church.
- Bishop Aldhun consecrates a cathedral (later Durham Cathedral) at a site in England where the remains of St. Cuthbert had been moved to in AD 995 from Lindisfarne because of the danger of Viking raids.
- Sigmundur Brestisson, a Viking chieftain, introduces Christianity in the Faroe Islands.

== Births ==
- March 5 – Bao Zheng, Chinese politician of the Song dynasty (d. 1062)
- Berengar of Tours, French theologian (approximate date) (d. 1088)
- Fujiwara no Ishi, Japanese empress consort (d. 1036)
- Odo, Count of Penthièvre, duke and regent of Brittany (approximate date) (d. 1079)

== Deaths ==
- February 7 – Boleslaus II ("the Pious"), duke of Bohemia (b. c.932)
- February 18 – Gregory V, pope of the Catholic Church (b. 972)
- February – Matilda, German princess-abbess and daughter of Otto I (b. 955)
- June 11 – Ebergar (or Everger), archbishop of Cologne (b. c.940)
- November 4 – Gregor von Burtscheid, German abbot
- December 16 – Adelaide of Italy, empress regent of the Holy Roman Empire (b. 931)
- Alfred of Malmesbury (or Aelfric), English abbot and writer
- Cao Bin, Chinese general and governor (jiedushi) (b. 931)
- Ceallach ua Maílcorgus, Irish chief poet of Connacht
- Maredudd ab Owain, king of Gwynedd (Wales) (approximate date)
- Muirgheas mac Aedh, king of Uí Díarmata (Ireland) (killed)
- Subh of Córdoba, mother and regent of Hisham II (approximate date)
- Yelü Xiezhen, Chinese general and politician
