= 995 =

Calendar year

995 in various calendars
- Gregorian calendar: 995; CMXCV
- Ab urbe condita: 1748
- Armenian calendar: 444; ԹՎ ՆԽԴ
- Assyrian calendar: 5745
- Balinese saka calendar: 916–917
- Bengali calendar: 401–402
- Berber calendar: 1945
- Buddhist calendar: 1539
- Burmese calendar: 357
- Byzantine calendar: 6503–6504
- Chinese calendar: 甲午年 (Wood Horse); 3692 or 3485 — to — 乙未年 (Wood Goat); 3693 or 3486
- Coptic calendar: 711–712
- Discordian calendar: 2161
- Ethiopian calendar: 987–988
- Hebrew calendar: 4755–4756
- Hindu calendars
- Vikram Samvat: 1051–1052
- Shaka Samvat: 916–917
- Kali Yuga: 4095–4096
- Holocene calendar: 10995
- Iranian calendar: 373–374
- Islamic calendar: 384–385
- Japanese calendar: Shōryaku 6 / Chōtoku 1 (長徳元年)
- Javanese calendar: 896–897
- Julian calendar: 995; CMXCV
- Korean calendar: 3328
- Minguo calendar: 917 before ROC 民前917年
- Nanakshahi calendar: −473
- Seleucid era: 1306/1307 AG
- Thai solar calendar: 1537–1538
- Tibetan calendar: ཤིང་ཕོ་རྟ་ལོ་ (male Wood-Horse); 1121 or 740 or −32 — to — ཤིང་མོ་ལུག་ལོ་ (female Wood-Sheep); 1122 or 741 or −31

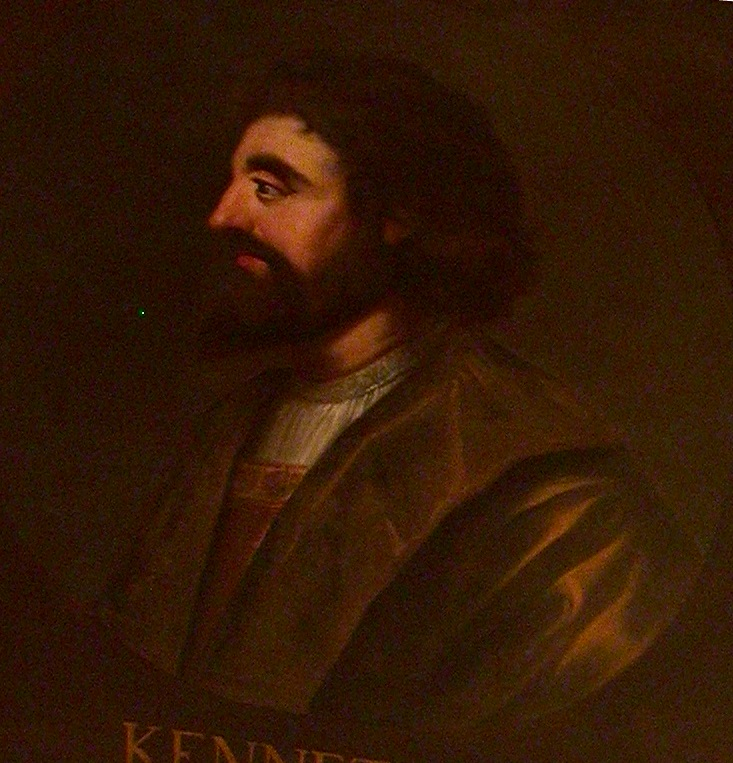
King Kenneth II of Scotland (r. 971–995)

Year 995 (CMXCV) was a common year starting on Tuesday of the Julian calendar.

== Events ==
=== Europe ===
- King Eric VI (the Victorious) dies at Uppsala, after a 25-year reign. He is succeeded by his son Olof Skötkonung, as the first baptized Christian ruler of Sweden.
- September 28 – Boleslaus II (the Pious), duke of Bohemia, storms Libice Castle and massacres the members of the Slavník Dynasty.
- Olaf Tryggvason is crowned king of Norway (and ruled until 1000) and builds the country's first Christian church.
- Malachy captures Dublin for the third time.

==== Scotland ====
- King Kenneth II is murdered at a banquet by Lady Finella in Fettercairn. He is succeeded by his nephew Constantine III (a son of the late King Cuilén) as ruler of Alba (Scotland).

==== England ====
- Uhtred (the Bold), a son of Ealdorman Waltheof I of Northumbria, establishes an episcopal see at Durham and moves the monastic community of Chester-le-Street there.

=== Asia ===
- Goryeo-Khitan War: Negotiations led by the Korean diplomat Sŏ Hŭi prevents a fullscale invasion of the Khitan-led Liao Dynasty. King Seongjong accepts Liao's demands – and agrees to end the alliance with the Chinese Song Dynasty. Goryeo becomes a Liao tributary state, the Khitan army (60,000 men) withdraws while Seongjong orders the Korean border defenses strengthened.

==== Byzantine Empire ====
- Arab–Byzantine War: Emperor Basil II launches a counter-campaign against the Fatimid Caliphate. He leads a Byzantine expeditionary army (13,000 men) to aid the Hamdanid emir Sa'id al-Dawla, and crosses Asia Minor in only sixteen days. Basil lifts the siege of Aleppo, and takes over the Orontes Valley. He incorporates Syria into the Byzantine Empire (including the larger city of Antioch) which is the seat of its eponymous Patriarch.

==== Armenia ====
- 995 Balu earthquake. It reportedly affected the Armenian areas of Balu, Cop'k (or Covk'), Palnatun (or Palin), and the districts of Hasteank and Xorjean. The areas affected were districts in what is currently the border area between Armenia and Turkey.

==== Japan ====
- 17 May - Fujiwara no Michitaka (imperial regent) dies.
- 3 June: Fujiwara no Michikane gains power and becomes Regent.
- 10 June: Fujiwara no Michikane dies.
- 30 August - Retainers of Takaie clash with retainers of Michinaga, on the main street of Kyoto.
- 4 September - Michinaga’s escort, Hata no Hisatada, is killed by Takaie’s followers.
- 15 October - Michinaga becomes Chief of the Fujiwara Clan.

=== Vietnam ===
- In the spring, as the commissioner of Như Hồng province of Qinzhou refused to extradite Bốc Văn Dũng, a Đại Cồ Việt political criminal, more than 100 Đại Cồ Việt battleships raided Như Hồng province, plundered the residents and their food supplies before withdrawing. Until the summer, 5000 Đại Cồ Việt infantry troops attacked Namzningz but were defeated.

== Births ==
- Abu'l-Fadl Bayhaqi, Persian historian and writer (d. 1077)
- Cnut (the Great), king of Denmark, Norway and England (d. 1035)
- Dominic Loricatus, Italian priest and hermit (d. 1060)
- Frederick II, duke of Upper Lorraine (approximate date)
- Herman II, archbishop of Cologne (approximate date)
- Hemma of Gurk, German noblewoman (d. 1045)
- Olaf II Haraldsson (St. Olaf), king of Norway (d. 1030)
- Reginar V, French nobleman (approximate date)
- Shaykh Tusi, Persian Shia scholar (d. 1067)
- William I, Norman nobleman (approximate date)

== Deaths ==
- March 30 – Sahib ibn Abbad, Persian statesman
- May 10 – Baldwin I (or Boudewijn), bishop of Utrecht
- May 16 – Fujiwara no Michitaka, Japanese nobleman (b. 953)
- June 13 – Fujiwara no Michikane, Japanese nobleman (b. 961)
- Abu 'Abdallah Muhammad, Afrighid ruler of Khwarezm
- Al-Mansur ibn Buluggin, Zirid ruler of Ifriqiyah
- Bernard I (the Suspicious), Frankish nobleman
- Egill Skallagrímsson, Viking poet (approximate date)
- Eric VI (the Victorious), Viking king of Sweden
- García Fernández, count of Castile and Álava
- Gebhard II, bishop of Constance (b. 949)
- Gerberga of Lorraine, Frankish noblewoman
- Haakon Sigurdsson, Viking ruler (jarl) of Norway
- Henry II (the Wrangler), duke of Bavaria (b. 951)
- Herbert III (the Younger), Frankish nobleman
- Kenneth II (the Fratricide), king of Alba (Scotland)
- Lady Finella, Scottish noblewoman and assassin
- Michitsuna no Haha, Japanese female poet
- Mstivoj, Obodrite prince (approximate date)
- Song, empress of the Song Dynasty (b. 952)

== Sources ==
- Guidoboni, Emanuela; Traina, Giusto (1995), "A new catalogue of earthquakes in the historical Armenian area from antiquity to the 12th century", Annals of Geophysics, 38, doi:10.4401/ag-4134
