= 1024 =

Calendar year

1024 in various calendars
- Gregorian calendar: 1024; MXXIV
- Ab urbe condita: 1777
- Armenian calendar: 473; ԹՎ ՆՀԳ
- Assyrian calendar: 5774
- Balinese saka calendar: 945–946
- Bengali calendar: 430–431
- Berber calendar: 1974
- English Regnal year: N/A
- Buddhist calendar: 1568
- Burmese calendar: 386
- Byzantine calendar: 6532–6533
- Chinese calendar: 癸亥年 (Water Pig); 3721 or 3514 — to — 甲子年 (Wood Rat); 3722 or 3515
- Coptic calendar: 740–741
- Discordian calendar: 2190
- Ethiopian calendar: 1016–1017
- Hebrew calendar: 4784–4785
- Hindu calendars
- Vikram Samvat: 1080–1081
- Shaka Samvat: 945–946
- Kali Yuga: 4124–4125
- Holocene calendar: 11024
- Igbo calendar: 24–25
- Iranian calendar: 402–403
- Islamic calendar: 414–415
- Japanese calendar: Jian 4 / Manju 1 (万寿元年)
- Javanese calendar: 926–927
- Julian calendar: 1024; MXXIV
- Korean calendar: 3357
- Minguo calendar: 888 before ROC 民前888年
- Nanakshahi calendar: −444
- Seleucid era: 1335/1336 AG
- Thai solar calendar: 1566–1567
- Tibetan calendar: ཆུ་མོ་ཕག་ལོ་ (female Water-Boar); 1150 or 769 or −3 — to — ཤིང་ཕོ་བྱི་བ་ལོ་ (male Wood-Rat); 1151 or 770 or −2

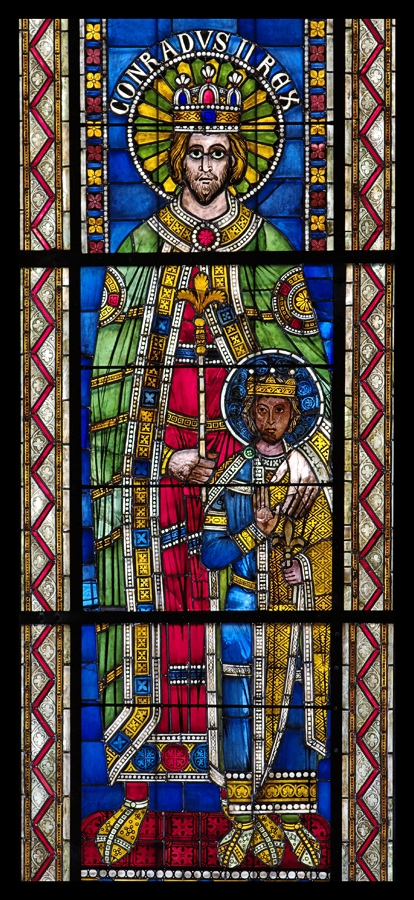
September 4: Conrad the Elder is elected King of Germany over his cousin, Conrad the Younger

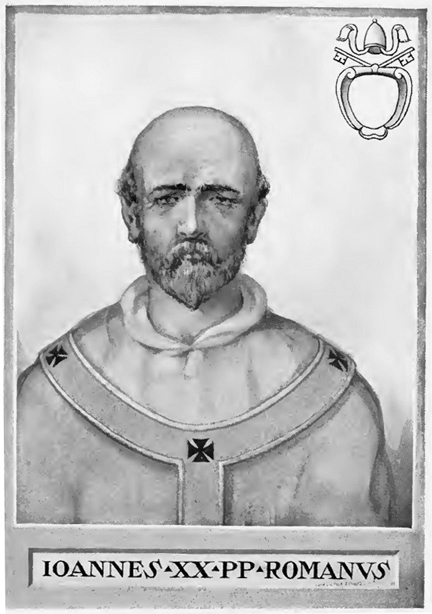
April 19: Pope John XIX succeeds his brother, Pope Benedict VIII

Year 1024 (MXXIV) was a leap year starting on Wednesday of the Julian calendar.

== Events ==
=== January–March ===
- January 17 – Abd al-Rahman V, Caliph of Córdoba is assassinated in a coup d'etat by Muhammad III of Córdoba.
- February 17 – According to the cartulary-chronicle of the Bèze Abbey (officially the Abbaye Saint-Pierre et Saint-Paul de Bèze) in the Burgundy region of France, the brothers Girard and Lambert repent of their seizure of the village of Viévigne and restore the property to the Abbey "for the good of their souls".
- March 9 – In Bamberg in Germany, the Holy Roman Emperor issues an order to regulate the ongoing dispute between the ministries of Fulda and Hersfeld
- March 23 (9 Muharram 415 AH) – In the first example of the reversal of the policy of religious tolerance created by the late Fatimid Caliph al-Hakim, Egyptian Christian Abu Zakariyya is arrested on charges of apostasy. Zakariyya, raised as a Christian, had converted to Islam, but then renounced Islam and converted back to Christianity, with immunity granted by al-Hakim. Zakariyya, apparently singled out for punishment is executed on October 14 (7 Shaban 415 CE).
- March – Massud ibn Tahir al-Wazzan, the vizier of the Fatimid Caliphate of Egypt since 1019, is dismissed by the Caliph al-Zahir li-I'zaz Din Allah, and replaced by al-Rudhbari.

=== April–June ===
- April 9 – Pope Benedict VIII, formerly Theophylact II, Count of Tusculum, dies after a reign of 12 years at Rome.
- April 19 – Romano de Tusculana, Count of Tusculum and the brother of the late Pope Benedict, arrives in Rome to become the 144th pope of the Roman Catholic Church, and takes the name Pope John XIX.
- May 4 (20 Safar 415) – The Ambassador from Khorasan to Egypt is received at Cairo by the Caliph al-Zahir.
- May 13 – Fujiwara no Takako, daughter of influential Japanese statesman Fujiwara no Michinaga, is married to Minamoto no Morofusa.
- June – Bedouins led by Abd Alla Ibn Idris al-Ja'fari attack the towns of Ayla and al-'Arish in southern Palestine after the Fatimids of Egypt refuse to restore al-Ja'fari as the Governor of the Wadi al-Qura.

=== July–September ===
- July 13 – Emperor Henry II, Holy Roman Emperor dies in his imperial palace at Göttingen in Germany. Henry leaves no heirs. He has deliberately made no provision for a successor, "leaving that regulation in the hands of God", and his death ends the Ottonian dynasty, and plans are made to elect a new Emperor in September.
- July 17 – In Japan, the Manju (万寿) era begins.
- July 27 – Thu'ban ibn Muhammad becomes the new Fatimid Governor of Aleppo.
- August 23 (17th day of 7th month of 1 Manju) – While Emperor Goichijo attends a sumo match in the Shishinden hall behind the Ichijo-in Temple, a fight breaks out between Judge Fujiwara Keisuke and Minamoto no Shigeto, leader of the Kurando Shikibu.
- August 27 (17 Jumada II 415) – The Cairo Canal is opened in Fatimid Egypt in a ceremony that includes the Caliph al-Zahir.
- August 29 (19 Jumada II 415) – In the wake of a famine striking Egypt, Yaqub ibn al-Dawwas issues an edict on the first day of the Coptic Christian new year, prohibiting the slaughter of cattle and announces that violators will forfeit their life and their property.
- August –
  - Anushtakin al-Dizbari, the Fatimid Governor of Palestine, confronts the Bedouin Jarrahids, sending troops to collect the taxes from the iqtaʿ(fief) of the Bayt Jibrin, led by Hassan ibn Mufarrij. The Jarrahids kill the collectors. Anushtakin retaliates by imprisoning two of Hassan's senior aides in Ascalon and gains permission from Caliph az-Zahir to attack Hassan while the latter is incapacitated by illness.
  - The Jarrahids, led by Hassan ibn Mufarrij, invade Palestine and attack the city of Tiberias, pillaging the town and killing civilians.
- September 1 – Basil Boioannes, Byzantine general and governor of the Catapanate of Italy, sails from Bari across the Adriatic Sea to begin an invasion of Croatia, ruled by Krešimir III. He later takes Kresimir's wife as a hostage, transporting her to Bari and then to Constantinople as a hostage.
- September 4 – Conrad the Elder is elected as the new King of Germany by an assembly of imperial princes and nobles at Kamba, receiving more votes than his cousin Conrad the Younger, son of Conrad I, Duke of Carinthia
- September 8 – Conrad the Elder is crowned as King Conrad II of Germany in a ceremony at Mainz, and he and Conrad the Younger are invested as joint dukes of Franconia.
- September 11 (4 Rajab 415) – Ibn Dawwas is fired from his job of administering food relief in Egypt, and replaced by Baqiyy, described as "a black slave who also managed the two shurtas" (food supplies) of Fustat and Cairo; Baqiyy is fired only two days later as the food crisis worsens, and Ibn Dawwas is rehired.
- September 21 – Gisela of Swabia, wife of Conrad II, is crowned as the Queen consort of Germany by Archbishop Pilgrim in a ceremony at Cologne. The royal couple then make a tour of Germany, traveling to Aachen (9/23), Nijmegen, Liege (10/2), Gendt (11/14), Dortmund and Minden.
- September –
  - In India, Sultan Mahmud of Ghazni begins his 12th, and final, expedition of plunder, departing with a cavalry of 30,000 troops, toward Multan, followed by Ajmer and Anhilvada, arriving at Somnath on January 30.
  - Anushtakin al-Dizbari of Palestine leads an expedition in the mountains around Nablus to apprehend the Bedouin leader Hassan ibn Mufarrij. However, the latter, with 3,000 of his horsemen, repulses Anushtakin, who retreats to Ramla, the capital of Palestine. Hassan and his troops then arrive at Ramla and burn the capital.

=== October—December ===
- October –
  - Salih ibn Mirdas's forces, led by Ibn Tawq, advance against Aleppo and fight sporadic engagements with the Fatimid troops of governors Thu'ban and Mawsuf. Salih and the Bedouins camp outside of Bab al-Jinan and demand surrender from the lead Islamic judge of the city, Ibn Abi Usama, and are refused.
  - The Banu Kalb, under Sinan ibn Ulayyan begins its siege of Damascus
  - The Tayy takes over Ramla, capital of Palestine.
- November 22 (17 Ramadan 415 AH) – The siege of Aleppo is started by Salih ibn Mirdas and an army of Bedouin warriors. After a siege of more than 50 days, and heavy casualties on both sides, Aleppo surrenders on January 18, 1025 (13 Dhu al-Qa'da 415 AH).
- November – After a 20 day of siege, Mansur I, formerly the Emir of Derbent recaptures the capital from the Emir Yazid ibn Ahmad with help from the Christian state of Sarir.
- December 17 – The monastery of Grottaferrata, outside of Rome, is consecrated by Pope John XIX and dedicated to the Virgin Mary.
- December 29 – The Fatimid caliph celebrates the Eid al-Fitr in an elaborate ceremony at the Anwar Mosque, as recounted later by the Amir al-Musabbihi.
- December – Sultan al-Dawla, Emir of Fars, dies and is succeeded by Abu Kalijar.

=== By place ===
==== Europe ====
- Byzantine expedition to invade Sicily: Governor Ahmed al-Akhal appeals to the Zirids of Ifriqiya for help. They dispatch a fleet, but these are caught up in a storm and destroyed near Pantelleria.
- Battle of Lemnos: Kievan Viking raiders (800 men) sail through the straits at Abydos to the Aegean Sea. From there they make for the island of Lemnos, but are defeated by a Byzantine fleet of the Cibyrrhaeot Theme.
- Roger I of Tosny, a Norman nobleman, leaves the battlefield of the Ebro Valley after terrorising the Saracens and capturing several towns and castles during the Reconquista in the Iberian Peninsula (modern Spain).

==== Asia ====
- Japanese waka poet Daini no Sanmi, lady-in-waiting to dowager Grand Empress Shōshi, is married to Fujiwara no Kanetaka.
- Japanese waka poet Sagami divorces, returns to Kyoto and becomes a lady-in-waiting to Imperial Princess Shushi.
- Murder of the daughter of the late Japanese Emperor Kazan, a lady-in-waiting to Shōshi who orders an investigation.
- Jiaozi, the world's first paper-printed money, which later greatly benefits the economy of the Song dynasty, originates in the Sichuan province of China.
- Sultan Mahmud of Ghazni sacks the Hindu religious center of Somnath and takes away a booty of 20 million dinars (approximate date).

== Births ==
- May 13 – Hugh the Great, abbot of Cluny (d. 1109)
- Al-Kunduri, vizier of the Seljuk Empire (d. 1064)
- Bruno II, margrave of Friesland (d. 1057)
- Fu Yaoyu, Chinese official and politician (d. 1091)
- Iziaslav I, Grand Prince of Kiev (d. 1078)
- Magnus the Good, king of Norway (d. 1047)

== Deaths ==
- April 9 – Benedict VIII, pope of the Catholic Church
- July 13 – Henry II, Holy Roman Emperor (b. 973)
- Abd ar-Rahman V, Umayyad caliph of Córdoba
- Alpert of Metz, French Benedictine chronicler
- Brihtwine, bishop of Wells (approximate date)
- Choe Hang, civil minister of Goryeo (Korea)
- Cúán úa Lothcháin, Irish poet and Chief Ollam
- Hugbert (or Hukbrecht), bishop of Meissen
- Sultan al-Dawla, Buyid emir of Fars (b. 993)
