= Empress Sadako =

Empress Sadako can refer to:

- Fujiwara no Teishi (藤原 定子; 977–1001), also known as Sadako, empress consort of the Japanese Emperor Ichijō
- Princess Sadako Kujō (九条 節子), later Empress Teimei (貞明皇后) of Japan (1884–1951), wife of Emperor Taishō
