= Fujiwara no Michitaka =

Japanese noble (953–995)

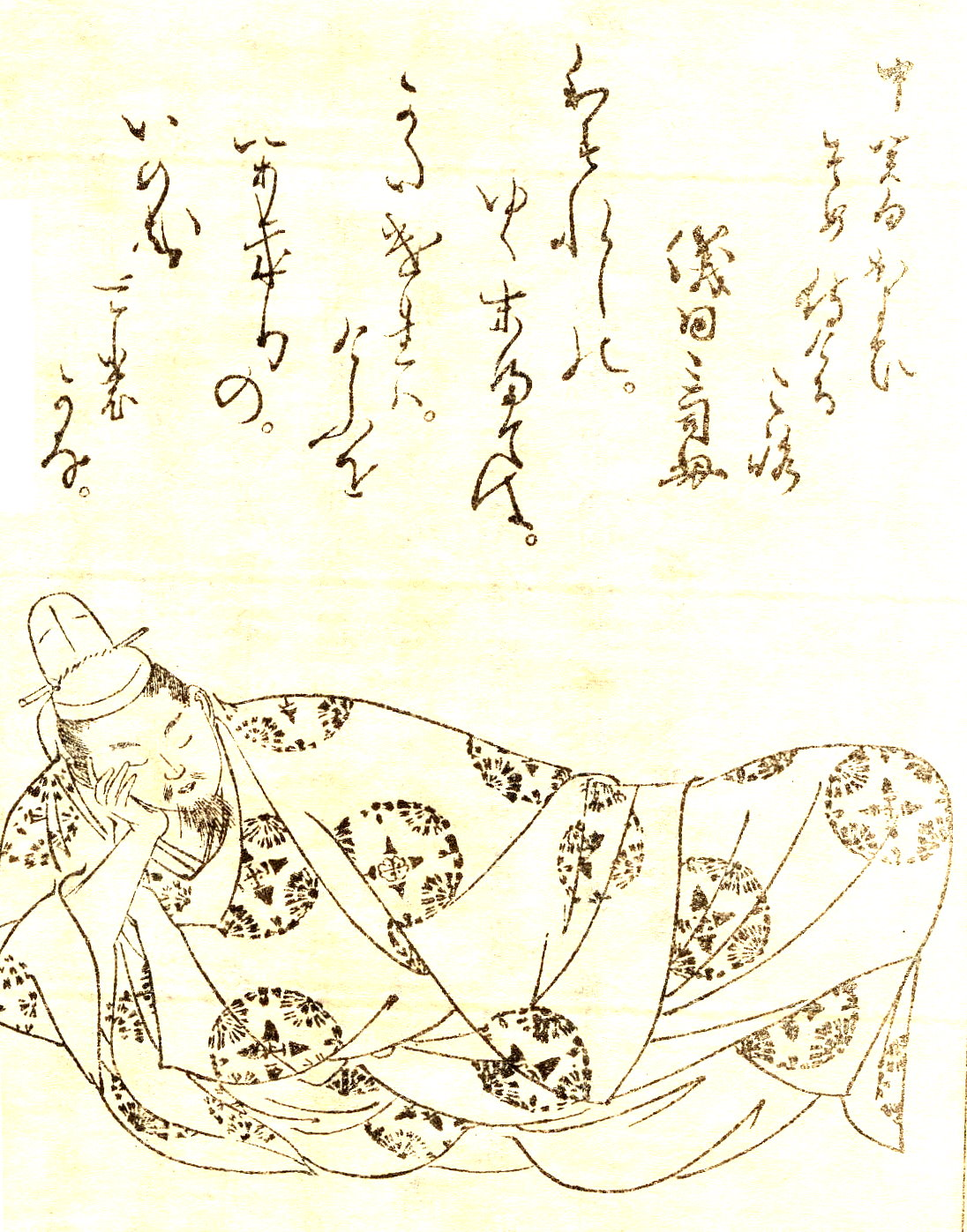

Fujiwara no Michitaka (藤原 道隆; 953 – May 16, 995), the first son of Kaneie, was a Kugyō (Japanese noble) of the Heian period. He served as regent (Sesshō) for the Emperor Ichijō, and later as Kampaku. Ichijō married Michitaka's daughter Teishi (Sadako), thus continuing the close ties between the Imperial family and the Fujiwara.

Michitaka is sometimes referred to as Nijō Kampaku (二条関白) or Naka-no-Kampaku (中関白).

== Career ==
- Kanna 2 (986): Chūnagon (中納言)
- Kanna 2 (986): Gon-no-Dainagon (権大納言)
- Eien 3, on the 23rd day of the 2nd month (989): Naidaijin (内大臣)
- Shōryaku 1, on the 8th day of the 5th month (990): Kampaku (関白) for Emperor Ichijō
- Shōryaku 1, on the 26th day of the 5th month (990): Sesshō (摂政) for Emperor Ichijō
- Shōryaku 2, on the 23rd day of the 7th month (991): retire from Naidaijin
- Shōryaku 4, on the 22nd day of the 4th month (993): Kampaku for the Emperor Ichijō
- Chōtoku 1, on the 3rd day of the 4th month (995): retire from Kampaku
- Chōtoku 1, in the 10th day of the 4th month (May 16, 995): Michitaka died at the age of 43.

== Family ==
- Father: Fujiwara no Kaneie (藤原兼家, 929–990)
- Mother: Fujiwara no Tokihime (藤原時姫, ?–980), daughter of Fujiwara no Nakamasa (藤原中正)
  - Wife: Takashina no Takako (高階貴子, ?–996), daughter of Takashina no Naritada (高階成忠), called Kō-no-Naishi (高内侍) or Gidō-sanshi no Haha (儀同三司母).
    - 3rd son: Fujiwara no Korechika (藤原伊周, 974–1010)
    - 1st daughter: Fujiwara no Teishi (藤原定子, 977–1001), empress consort of Emperor Ichijō.
    - 4th son: Fujiwara no Takaie (藤原隆家, 979–1044)
    - 2nd daughter: Fujiwara no Genshi (Motoko) (藤原原子, 980?–1002), consort of Emperor Sanjō.
    - Son: Ryūen (隆円, 980-1015), Komatsu Sōzu, priest.
    - 3rd daughter: Fujiwara no Yoriko? (藤原頼子, ?-?), married to Prince Atsumichi (son of Emperor Reizei).
    - 4th daughter: name unknown, Mikushige-dono-no-bettō (御匣殿別当, 985?-1002), concubine of Emperor Ichijō.
  - Wife: daughter of Fujiwara no Morihito (藤原守仁の娘, ?-988)
    - 1st son: Fujiwara no Michiyori (藤原道頼, 971-995), adopted by his grandfather, Fujiwara no Kaneie.
  - Wife: daughter of Iyo-no-kami Tomotaka (伊予守奉孝の娘)
    - Son: Fujiwara no Chikaie (藤原周家, ?-1038)
    - Son: Fujiwara no Chikayori (藤原周頼, ?-1019)
  - Wife: daughter of Fujiwara no Kuninori (藤原国章の娘)
    - 5th daughter: lady-in-waiting for Fujiwara no Kenshi, wife of Emperor Sanjō
  - Wife: Tachibana no Kiyoko (橘清子, ?-?)
    - Son: Fujiwara no Yoshichika (藤原好親, ?-?)
  - Wife: unknown
    - 2nd son: Fujiwara no Yorichika (藤原頼親, 972-1010)
    - Daughter: wife of Taira no Shigeyoshi (平重義室)
