= Kantoku =

Period of Japanese history (1044–1046 CE)

Kantoku (寛徳) was a Japanese era name (年号, nengō; lit. "year name") after Chōkyū and before Eishō, This period spanned the years from November 1044 through April 1046. The reigning emperors were Go-Suzaku-tennō (後朱雀天皇) and Go-Reizei-tennō (後冷泉天皇).

== Change of era ==
- 1044 Kantoku gannen (寛徳元年): The new era name was created to mark an event or series of events. The previous era ended and the new one commenced in Chokyu 5, on the 24th day of the 11th month of 1044.

== Events of the Kantoku era ==
- 1045 (Kantoku 2, 16th day of the 1st month): Emperor Go-Suzaku abdicated; and his eldest son received the succession (senso) on the same day. Shortly thereafter, Emperor Go-Reizei formally accedes to the throne (sokui). The following year, the era name is changed to mark the beginning of Go-Reizei's reign.
- 1045 (Kantoku 2, 18th day in the 1st month): Go-Suzaku died at the age of 37.

== General references ==
- Brown, Delmer M., and Ichirō Ishida, eds. (1979). Gukanshō: The Future and the Past. Berkeley: University of California Press. ISBN 978-0-520-03460-0. OCLC 251325323.
- Nussbaum, Louis-Frédéric, and Käthe Roth. (2005). Japan Encyclopedia. Cambridge: Harvard University Press. ISBN 978-0-674-01753-5. OCLC 58053128.
- Titsingh, Isaac (1834). Nihon Odai Ichiran; ou, Annales des empereurs du Japon. Paris: Royal Asiatic Society, Oriental Translation Fund of Great Britain and Ireland. OCLC 5850691.
- Varley, H. Paul (1980). A Chronicle of Gods and Sovereigns: Jinnō Shōtōki of Kitabatake Chikafusa. New York: Columbia University Press. ISBN 9780231049405; OCLC 6042764.

Preceded by Chōkyū	Era or nengō Kantoku; 1044–1046	Succeeded by Eishō
