= Chōgen =

Period of Japanese history (1028–1037 CE)

Chōgen (長元) was a Japanese era name (年号, nengō; lit. "year name") after Manju and before Chōryaku. This period spanned the years from July 1028 through April 1037. The reigning emperors were Go-Ichijō-tennō (後一条天皇) and Go-Suzaku-tennō (後朱雀天皇).

== Change of era ==
- 1028 Chōgen gannen (長元元年): The new era name Chōgen was created to mark and event or series of events. The previous era ended and the new one commenced in Manju 5, on the 25th day of the 7th month.

== Events of the Chōgen era ==
- Chōgen 9, on the 17th day of the 4th month (1036): In the 9th year of Emperor Go-Ichijō's reign (後一条天皇9年), he died; and the succession (senso) was received by his son.
- Chōgen 9, in the 7th month (1036): Emperor Go-Suzaku is said to have acceded to the throne (sokui).

== Notes ==
Preceded by Manju	Era or nengō Chōgen; 1028–1037	Succeeded by Chōryaku
