= Eiso (era) =

Period of Japanese history (988–990 CE)

Eiso (永祚) was a Japanese era name (年号, nengō; lit. "year name") after Eien and before Shōryaku. This period spanned the years from August 988 through November 990. The reigning emperor was Ichijō-tennō (一条天皇).

== Change of era ==
- 989 Eiso gannen (永祚元年): The new era name was created to mark an event or a number of events. The previous era ended and a new one commenced in Eien 2, on the 8th day of the 8th month of 989.

== Events of Eiso era ==
- 989 (Eiso 1, 1st month): Emperor Ichijō made a personal visit to the home of his father, the retired Emperor En'yū, who is now known as Kongō Hō.
- 989 (Eiso 1, 5th month): Fujiwara no Kaneie fell ill, and his son, Fujiwara no Michitaka, was chosen as regent (Kampaku) in his place. Kaneie retired from public life. He shaved his head and became a Buddhist monk.
- July 26, 989 (Eiso 2, 2nd day of the 7th month): Fujiwara no Kaneie died at age 62, and his home was converted into a Buddhist temple.

== Notes ==
Preceded by Eien	Era or nengō Eiso; 988–990	Succeeded by Shōryaku
