= Tengi =

Period of Japanese history (1053–1058 CE)

Tengi (天喜) was a Japanese era (年号, nengō; lit. "year name") after Eishō and before Kōhei, spanning the years from January 1053 through August 1058. The reigning emperor was Go-Reizei-tennō (後冷泉天皇).

== Change of Era ==
- 1053 Tengi 1 (天喜元年): The new era name was created to mark an event or series of events. The previous era ended and the new one commenced in Eishō 7, on the 11th day of the 1st month of 1053.

== Events of the Tengi Era ==
- 1056 (Tengi 4, 7th-8th months): A broom star was observed in the east at daybreak.
- 1057 (Tengi 5, 9th month): Abe no Yoritoki is killed in battle by a stray arrow.

== Notes ==
Preceded by Eishō	Era or nengō Tengi; 1053–1058	Succeeded by Kōhei
