= Toi invasion =

1019 invasion of northern Kyūshū by Jurchen pirates

Date	4 –20 May 1019
Location	Hakata Bay 33.618°N 130.333°E
Result	Many Japanese girls kidnapped and enslaved, as well as livestock killed.

Belligerents
Jurchen pirates	Japanese Dazaifu; Goryeo

Commanders and leaders
Unknown	Fujiwara no Masatada †; Fujiwara no Takaie; Ōkura no Taneki

Strength
3,000	?

Casualties and losses
8 ships captured by Goryeo	850+ (killed and abducted) 350 dead, 1,300 enslaved. Only 259 or 270 were returned by Koreans from the 8 ships.
- ?
- Location within Japan

The Toi invasion (Japanese: 刀伊の入寇, Hepburn: Toi no nyūkō) was the invasion of northern Kyushu by Jurchen pirates in 1019.

== History ==
Toi (되, twoy) meant "barbarian" in Middle Korean. The Toi pirates sailed with about 50 ships from the direction of Goryeo, then assaulted Tsushima and Iki provinces, beginning on 27 March 1019. After the Iki Island garrison, consisting of 147 soldiers led by Fujiwara Noritada, was wiped out, the Jurchen slaughtered all the men while seizing women as prisoners. Fujiwara Noritada, the governor, was killed.

Subsequently, the Jurchen raided the Ido, Shima, and Sawara counties of Chikuzen Province and, on April 9, attacked Hakata (now a ward of the city of Fukuoka). For a week, using Noko Island in Hakata Bay as a base, they sacked villages and kidnapped over 1000 Japanese, mostly women and young girls, for use as slaves. The Dazaifu, the administrative center of Kyūshū, then raised an army and successfully drove them away.

After that, they then raided Matsuura county in Hizen Province from April 13 to May 20, and were eventually repelled by Genchi, the founder of the "Matsuura 48 Parties", and after attacking Tsushima again, they retreated towards the Korean Peninsula.

A few months later, the Goryeo delegate Jeong Jaryang (鄭子良) reported that the Goryeo Navy had intercepted the Jurchens off of Wonsan and eliminated them. They rescued around 300 captives, who were "provided white clothes and fed meals with silverware" by the Goryeo government. Goryeo then repatriated them back to Japan, where they were thanked by the Dazaifu and given rewards. There remain detailed reports by two captive women, Kura no Iwame and Tajihi no Akomi, with Kura no Iwame's report transcribed.

The children and women kidnapped by the Jurchens were most likely forced to become sex slaves. Only 270 or 259 Japanese on eight ships were returned when Goryeo intercepted them. 1,280 were taken prisoner, 374 were killed, and 380 livestock were killed for food.

The Jurchen lived in Hamgyong Province, now in North Korea.

Traumatic memories of the Jurchen raids on Japan and the Mongol invasions of Japan, in addition to the adoption of the Hua–Yi distinction, contributed to Japan's antagonistic views toward the Jurchens and, later, the Manchus. For example, Tokugawa Ieyasu viewed the Later Jin of the Jurchens as a threat. The Japanese mistakenly believed that Yezo (now Hokkaido) had a land bridge to the Jurchen homeland, and therefore thought they could invade Japan by land. In 1627, the Tokugawa shogunate sent a message to Joseon via Tsushima, offering help to Joseon against the Later Jin invasion of Joseon. However, Joseon refused. During Toyotomi Hideyoshi's Imjin War, the Hamgyong campaign was a direct invasion of Jurchen-controlled territory from conquered Joseon.

== See also ==
- Hamgyong campaign – Japanese forces encounter the Jurchens during the Imjin War in 1592
