= Eishō (Heian period) =

Period of Japanese history (1046–1053 CE)

Eishō (永承) was a Japanese era name (年号, nengō; lit. "year name") after Kantoku and before Tengi. This period spanned the years from April 1046 through January 1053. The reigning emperor was Go-Reizei-tennō (後冷泉天皇).

== Change of era ==
- 1046 Eishō gannen (永承元年): The new era name was created to mark an event or series of events. The previous era ended and the new one commenced in Kantoku 3, on the 14th day of the 4th month of 1046.

== Events of the Eishō era ==
- 1046 (Eishō 1): Minamoto no Yorinobu wrote about the spirit of Emperor Ojin and worshiping him as a manifestation of Iwashimizu Hachiman and as one of Yorinobu's ancestors.
- 1048 (Eishō 3): Yorinobu died at the age of 81.
- 1051 (Eishō 6): In Michinoku, Abe no Sadatō and Munetō instigate a rebellion which becomes known as the Nine Years' War (1051–1062) because, even though the period of strife lasts for 11 years, the actual fighting lasts for nine years. In response, Minamoto no Yoriyoshi is appointed governor of Mutsu and he is named chinjufu shōgun. He is given these titles and powers so that he will be able to restore peace in the north. Yoriyoshi would have been the first to receive this specific shogunal title, although his grandfather (Minamoto no Tsunemoto) had been seitō fuku-shōgun (assistant commander for pacification of the east).

The eleventh reconstruction of the Kasuga Shrine in Nara was completed during this era.

== Notes ==
Preceded by Kantoku	Era or nengō Eishō; 1046–1052	Succeeded by Tengi
