= Fujiwara no Korechika =

Japanese noble (974–1010)

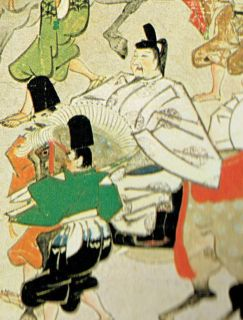

Fujiwara no Korechika (藤原 伊周; 974 – February 14, 1010), the second son of Michitaka, was a kugyo (Japanese noble) of the Heian period. His mother was Takashina no Takako, also known as Kō-no-Naishi (高内侍). His sister Teishi (Sadako) was married to Emperor Ichijō, and Korechika aspired to become the regent (Sessho) for his young brother-in-law after his father's death. Korechika's (ultimately fruitless) ambitions pitted him against his powerful uncle, Fujiwara no Michinaga, and the resulting power struggle continued until Empress Teishi's unexpected death. This left Michinaga's daughter, Shoshi, as Ichijō's sole empress, solidifying Michinaga's power at court.

In Chōtoku 2 (長徳2年) (996), Korechika and his younger brother Takaie were exiled to Dazaifu. Korechika was charged with shooting an arrow at Retired Emperor Kazan, and performing an esoteric Shingon curse known as Daigensuihō (大元帥法), which was reserved solely for the emperor. He was pardoned a year later, and subsequently became Jun-Daijin (associate minister; 准大臣).

Korechika is sometimes referred to as Gidō-sanshi (儀同三司) or Sochi no Naidaijin (帥内大臣).

== Career ==
- Shōryaku 2 (991): Named Sangi (参議)
- Shōryaku 3 (992): Named Gon-no-Chūnagon (権中納言)
- Shōryaku 3 (992): Named Gon-no-Dainagon (権大納言)
- Shōryaku 5, on the 28th day of the 8th month (994): Named Naidaijin (内大臣)
- Chōtoku 2, on the 24th day of the 4th month (996): Exiled to Dazaifu.
- Chōtoku 3, on the 5th day of the 4th month (997): Pardoned and permitted to return to Heian-kyō
- Kankō 5, on the 16th day of the 1st month (1008): Named Jun-Daijin (准大臣)
- Kankō 7, in the 28th day of the 1st month (February 14, 1010): Died at the age of 37.

== Marriages and children ==
He was married to a daughter of Gon-no-Dainagon Minamoto no Shigemitsu (源重光の娘).

They had three children.

- Fujiwara no Michimasa (道雅) (Ara-sammi, 荒三位) (992-1054) - Sakyo-no-Daibu (左京大夫)
- daughter, married to Fujiwara no Yorimune (son of Fujiwara no Michinaga)
- Chikako (周子), Lady-in-waiting for Empress Shōshi, consort of Emperor Ichijō, and married to Fujiwara no Yoshiyori
