= Emperor Go-Ichijō =

Emperor of Japan from 1016 to 1036

Emperor Go-Ichijō 後一条天皇
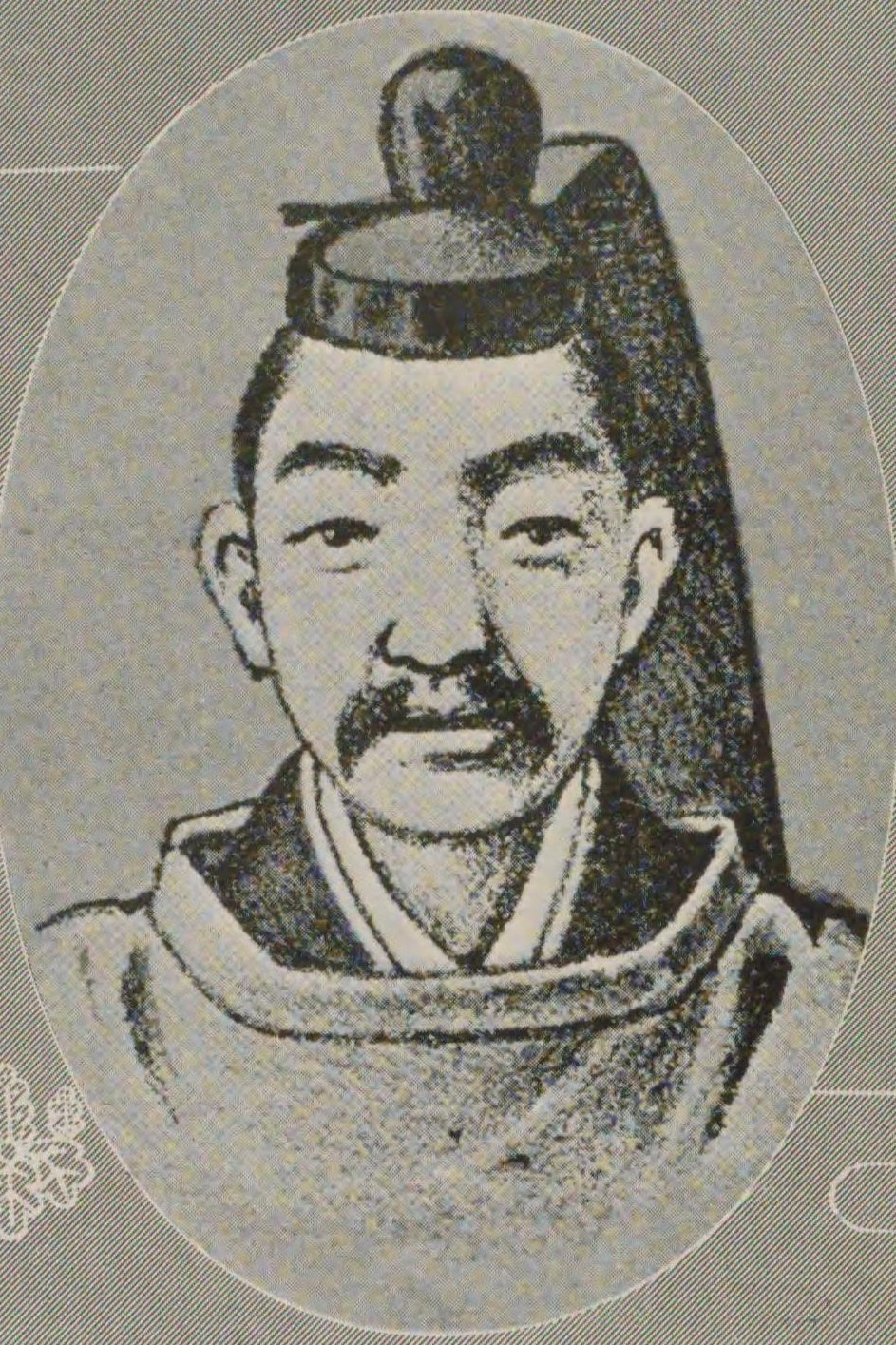

Emperor of Japan
- Reign: March 10, 1016 – May 15, 1036
- Enthronement: March 24, 1016
- Predecessor: Sanjō
- Successor: Go-Suzaku
- Born: October 12, 1008; Tsuchimikado Tei (土御門邸), Heian Kyō (Kyōto)
- Died: May 15, 1036 (aged 27); Seiryōden (清凉殿) of Inner Palace, Heian Kyō (Kyōto)
- Burial: Bodaijuin no misasagi (菩提樹院陵) (Kyoto)
- Spouse: Fujiwara no Ishi (m. 1018)
- Issue: Shōshi; Kaoruko
Posthumous name
- Tsuigō: Emperor Go-Ichijō (後一条院 or 後一条天皇)
- House: Imperial House of Japan
- Father: Emperor Ichijō
- Mother: Fujiwara no Shōshi

Emperor Go-Ichijō (後一条天皇, Go-Ichijō-tennō; October 12, 1008 – May 15, 1036) was the 68th emperor of Japan, according to the traditional order of succession.

Go-Ichijō's reign spanned the years from 1016 through 1036.

Empress Shōshi with her infant son Atsuhira (Go-Ichijō) was depicted in this 13th-century painting, with her father Fujiwara no Michinaga and lady-in-waiting Murasaki Shikibu presiding at the 50-day ceremony of the child's birth

This 11th century sovereign was named after his father, Emperor Ichijō, and go- (後), translates literally as "later"; thus, he is sometimes called the "Later Emperor Ichijō", or, in some older sources, may be identified as "Emperor Ichijō, the second", or even "Emperor Ichijō II".

== Biography ==
Before his ascension to the Chrysanthemum Throne, his personal name (imina) was Atsuhira -shinnō (敦成親王). He was also known as Atsunari-shinnō.

Atsuhira was the second son of Emperor Ichijō. His mother, Fujiwara no Akiko/Shōshi (藤原彰子) (988–1074), was a daughter of Fujiwara no Michinaga. In her later years, Ichijō's chūgo consort was known as Jōtō-mon In (上東門院).

== Events of Go-Ichijō's life ==
Atsuhira-shinnō was used as a pawn in Imperial court politics when he was only a child.

- 1012 (Chōwa 1, 8th month): Prince Atsuhira marries a daughter of sesshō and later kampaku Fujiwara no Michinaga.

Atsuhira became emperor at the age of 8, upon the abdication of his first cousin once removed, Emperor Sanjō.

- March 10, 1016 (Chōwa 5, 29th day of the 1st month): In the 5th year of Emperor Sanjō's reign (三条天皇五年), he abdicated; and the succession (‘‘senso’’) was received by a cousin. Shortly thereafter, Emperor Go-Ichijō is said to have acceded to the throne (‘‘sokui’’).

During the initial years of Go-Ichijō's reign, Fujiwara no Michinaga actually ruled from his position as sesshō (regent).

- June 5, 1017 (Kannin 1, 9th day of the 5th month): The former-Emperor Sanjō died at the age of 41.
- 1017 (Kannin 1, 8th month): Prince Atsuakira, the eldest son of Emperor Sanjo, had been named Crown Prince. But after he is struck by a skin disease and intense pressure from Michinaga; he withdrew from this role and his younger brother, Prince Atsunaga, was named Crown Prince in his place.
- 1017 (Kannin 1, 9th month): Michinaga made a pilgrimage to the Iwashimizu Shrine accompanied by many courtiers. The travelers divided themselves amongst 15 boats for a floating trip down the Yotogawa River. One of the vessels overturned, and more than 30 people lost their lives.
- 1017 (Kannin 1, 12th month): Michinaga was elevated to the office of Daijō-Daijin.
- May 15, 1036 (Chōgen 9, 17th day of the 4th month): Emperor Go-Ichijō died at the age of 27.

The actual site of Go-Ichijō's grave is known. This emperor is traditionally venerated at a memorial Shinto shrine (misasagi) at Kyoto.

The Imperial Household Agency designates this location as Go-Ichijō's mausoleum. It is formally named Bodaijuin no misasagi.

=== Kugyō ===
Kugyō (公卿) is a collective term for the very few most powerful men attached to the court of the Emperor of Japan in pre-Meiji eras. Even during those years in which the court's actual influence outside the palace walls was minimal, the hierarchic organization persisted.

In general, this elite group included only three to four men at a time. These were hereditary courtiers whose experience and background would have brought them to the pinnacle of a life's career. During Go-Ichijō's reign, this apex of the Daijō-kan included:

- Sesshō, Fujiwara Michinaga, 966–1027.
- Sesshō, Fujiwara Yorimichi, 992–1074.
- Kampaku, Fujiwara Yorimichi.
- Daijō-daijin, Fujiwara Michinaga.
- Daijō-daijin, Kan'in Kinsue, 956–1029.
- Sadaijin, Fujiwara Michinaga.
- Sadaijin, Fujiwara Akimitsu, 944–1021.
- Sadaijin, Fujiwara Yorimichi.
- Udaijin, Fujiwara Sanesuke, 957–1046.
- Nadaijin, Fujiwara Norimichi, 997–1075.
- Dainagon

== Eras of Go-Ichijō's reign ==
The years of Go-Ichijō's reign are more specifically identified by more than one era name or nengō.

- Chōwa (1012–1017)
- Kannin (1017–1021)
- Jian (1021–1024)
- Manju (1024–1028)
- Chōgen (1028–1037)

== Consort and children ==
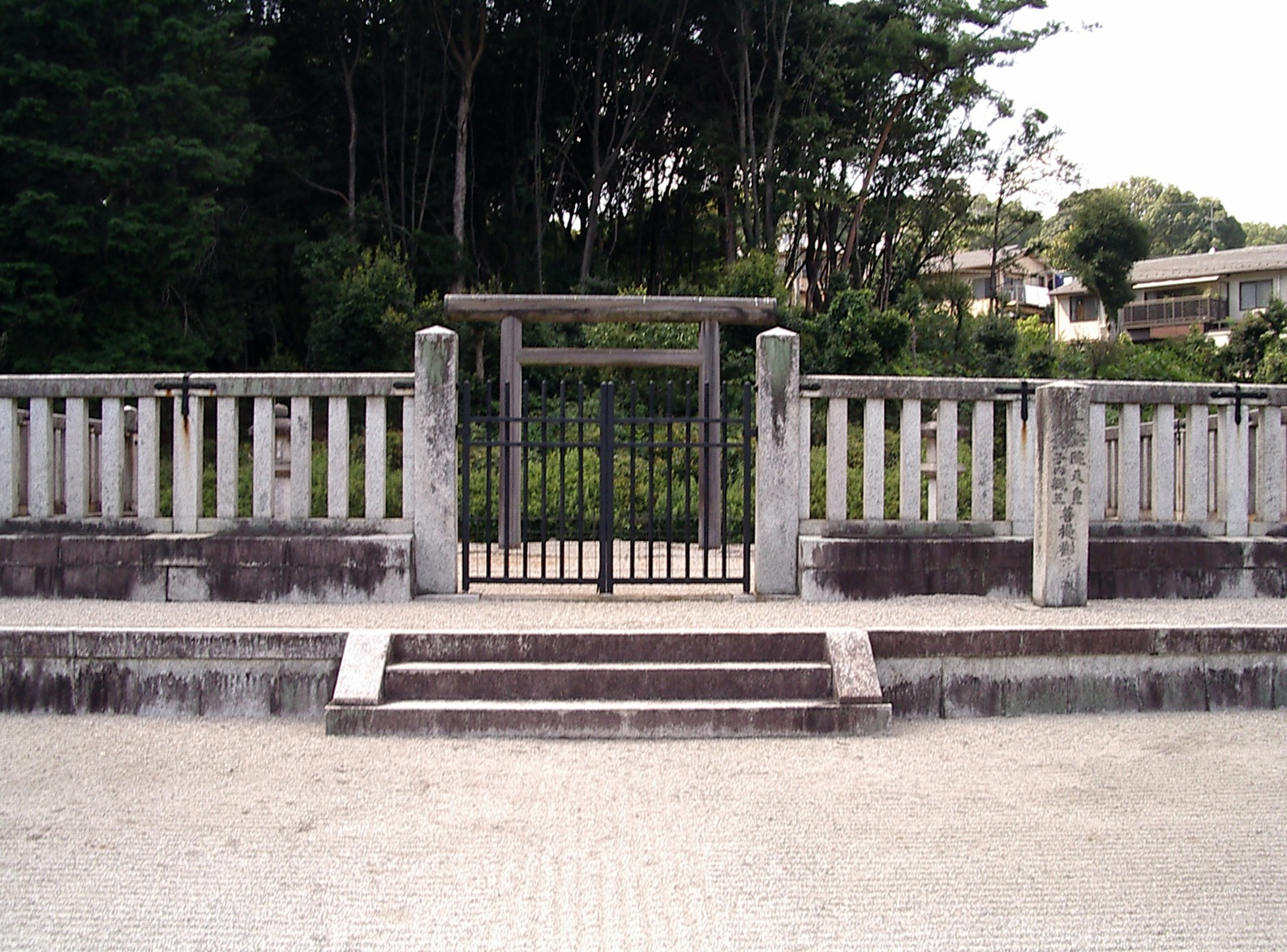
Tomb of Emperor Go-Ichijō and one of his daughters, Kyoto

Go-Ichijō had one Empress and two Imperial daughters.

Empress (Chūgū): Fujiwara no Ishi (藤原威子; 999–1036), Fujiwara no Michinaga’s third daughter

- First Daughter: Imperial Princess Akiko/Shōshi (章子内親王) later Nijō-In (二条院), Empress (chūgū) to Emperor Go-Reizei
- Second Daughter: Imperial Princess Kaoruko/Keishi (馨子内親王; 1029–1093) later Saien-no Kogo (西院皇后), Empress (chūgū) to Emperor Go-Sanjō

== Ancestry ==
Ancestors of Emperor Go-Ichijō

8. Emperor Murakami (926–967)
4. Emperor En'yū (959–991)
9. Fujiwara no Anshi (927–964)
2. Emperor Ichijō (980–1011)
10. Fujiwara no Kaneie (929–990) (=12)
5. Fujiwara no Senshi (962–1002)
11. Fujiwara no Tokihime (d. 980) (=13)
1. Emperor Go-Ichijō
12. Fujiwara no Kaneie (929–990) (=10)
6. Fujiwara no Michinaga (966–1028)
13. Fujiwara no Tokihime (d. 980) (=11)
3. Empress Shōshi (988–1074)
14. Minamoto no Masanobu (920–993)
7. Minamoto no Rinshi (964–1053)
15. Fujiwara no Bokushi (931–1016)

== See also ==
- Emperor of Japan
- List of Emperors of Japan
- Imperial cult

== Notes ==
Japanese Imperial kamon — a stylized chrysanthemum blossom

Regnal titles
Preceded by Emperor Sanjō	Emperor of Japan: Go-Ichijō; 1016–1036	Succeeded by Emperor Go-Suzaku
