= Takashina no Takako =

Japanese poet (d. 996)

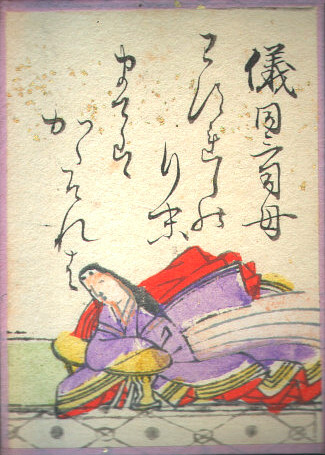
Takako, mother of the Honorary Grand Minister, from the Ogura Hyakunin Isshu.

Takashina no Takako (高階貴子, sometimes read Takashina no Kishi; died 996), also known as the mother of the Honorary Grand Minister (儀同三司母, Gidōsanshi no haha) or as Kō no Naishi (高内侍), was a Japanese waka poet of the mid-Heian period. One of her poems was included in the Ogura Hyakunin Isshu.

== Biography ==
She was the daughter of Takashina no Naritada (高階成忠).

By her husband Fujiwara no Michitaka, she was the mother of Takaie, Empress Teishi and Korechika, who was known as the Honorary Grand Minister (儀同三司, Gidōsanshi). She is accordingly frequently referred to as the mother of the Honorary Grand Minister.

Her other nickname, Kō no Naishi, is a combination of the first character of her patronymic family name — taka or kō — and her position serving Emperor En'yū, naishi.

She died in 996.

== Poetry ==
Five of her poems were included in imperial anthologies from the Shūi Wakashū onwards.

The following poem by her was included as the 54th in the Ogura Hyakunin Isshu:

忘れじの行く末まではかたければ
けふを限りの命ともがな
wasureji no yuku-sue made wa katakereba
kyō o kagiri no inochi to mogana
You promise you'll never forget, but to the end of time is too long to ask. So let me die today—still loved by you.
(Shin Kokin Wakashū 13:1149)

== Sources ==
- Keene, Donald (1999). A History of Japanese Literature, Vol. 1: Seeds in the Heart — Japanese Literature from Earliest Times to the Late Sixteenth Century. New York: Columbia University Press. ISBN 978-0-231-11441-7.
- McMillan, Peter. 2010 (1st ed. 2008). One Hundred Poets, One Poem Each. New York: Columbia University Press.
- Suzuki Hideo, Yamaguchi Shin'ichi, Yoda Yasushi. 2009 (1st ed. 1997). Genshoku: Ogura Hyakunin Isshu. Tokyo: Bun'eidō.
