= Chōhō (era) =

Period of Japanese history (999–1004 CE)

Chōhō (長保) was a Japanese era name (年号, nengō; lit. "year name") after Chōtoku and before Kankō. This period spanned the years from January 999 through July 1004. The reigning emperor was Ichijō-tennō (一条天皇).

== Change of era ==
- 999 Chōhō gannen (長保元年): The new era name was created to mark an event or a number of events. The previous era ended and a new one commenced in Chōtoku 5, on the 13th day of the 1st month of 999.

== Events of the Chōhō era ==
- 999 (Chōhō 1, 11th month: A daughter of Fujiwara no Michinaga is accepted into the Imperial household as Emperor Ichijō's second empress consort. Aikio, better known as Fujiwara no Shōshi (988–1074), is given the title of Chūgū.
- 1001 (Chōhō 3, 11th month): The Imperial palace was destroyed by fire.
- 1001 (Chōhō 3, 12th month): The widow of Emperor En'yū and the mother of Emperor Ichijō died. She was formerly known as Fujiwara no Senshi.

== Notes ==
Preceded by Shōryaku	Era or nengō Chōhō; 999–1004	Succeeded by Kankō
