= Daigensuihō =

Buddhist rite

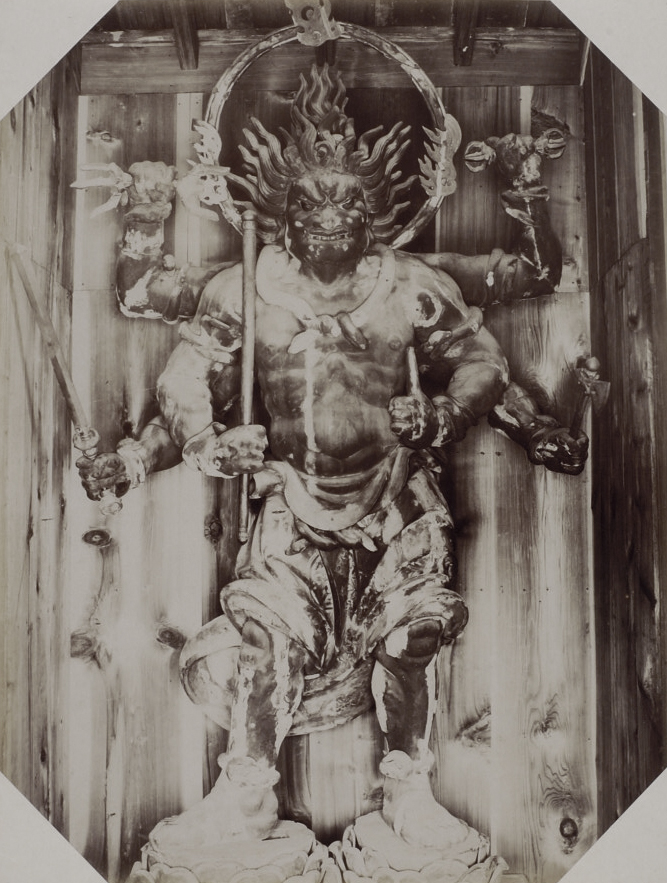
Image of Āṭavaka (大元帥明王, Daigensui myōō) at Akishino-dera, photographed in the 19th century.

The Daigensuihō (大元帥法), or the Great Rite of Āṭavaka, is one of the great rites (大法, daihō) of Esoteric Shingon Buddhism. Its name is also sometimes pronounced Daigen no hō. The ritual is performed with Āṭavaka in the role of honzon, and it may be considered a military curse.

== Early history ==
In the year 839, the monk Jōgyō, a disciple of Kūkai, introduced the Imperial Court to the procedures of the Daigensuihō as part of the systematic importation of Tang esoteric practices. A decade later in 851, the Daijō-kan issued a document ordering the annual implementation of the Daigensuihō. As a result, it is believed to have been formally established in that year.

Since then, the ritual was performed every year between the 8th to the 17th days after the New Year at the facilities of the Ministry of the Imperial Household. The necessary equipment was to be procured from Akishino-dera in Yamato Province, which was associated with Jōgyō.

Jōgyō's promotion of Daigensuihō put him in direct conflict with Ennin of the Tendai sect who instead lobbied for the implementation of the Rite of Prajvalushnisha (熾盛光法, Shijōkōhō) as the ritual of national defense.

The Daigensuihō was originally formulated as a prayer for "defense against foreign invasion" (外寇からの防衛, gaikō kara no bōei) and the "capitulation of enemy nations" (敵国降伏, tekikoku kōfuku) and was therefore performed only in the immediate presence of the Emperor. Vassals (i.e. the court aristocracy) were not allowed to perform it on their own initiative. In the Chōtoku Incident of 995, Interior Minister Fujiwara no Korechika was banished from the capital and relegated to a post in the Dazaifu on the pretext that he had conducted the Daigensuihō himself.

It is known that Oda Nobunaga, who at the time held the reins of government, cooperated with Emperor Ōgimachi in the restoration of the image of Āṭavaka in 1575. In the Edo period, the Daigensuihō was once again revived at the Imperial palace in Kyoto. It was held there until the Meiji Restoration.

== Modern military use ==
In 1904, Gumyō-ji of Yokohama produced a standing image of Āṭavaka which was used in a Daigensuihō performed in prayer for victory in the Russo-Japanese War. Later, during the Pacific War, the Daigensuihō was carried out for the last time in an invocation of a curse upon the Allied powers (連合国調伏, Rengōkoku chōbuku) by the Imperial Japanese Army.

Ihara Kesao points out the connection between the title "grand marshal" (大元帥, Daigensui), which was used by the emperor as the commander-in-chief of the Japanese armed forces, and the name of the Daigensuihō, which contains the same characters and was meant to be carried out solely in the emperor's presence.

== See also ==
- Ushi no toki mairi
