= Chōwa =

Period of Japanese history (1012–1017 CE)

Chōwa (長和) was a Japanese era name (年号, nengō; lit. "year name") after Kankō and before Kannin. This period spanned the years from December 1012 through April 1017. The reigning emperors were Sanjō-tennō (三条天皇) and Go-Ichijō-tennō (後一条天皇).

== Change of era ==
- 1012 Chōwa 1 (長和元年): The era name was changed to mark Emperor Sanjō's accession in the previous year. The previous era ended and a new one commenced in Kankō 9, on the 25th day of the 12th month of 1012.

== Events of the Chōwa era ==
- 1012 (Chōwa 1, 8th month): Emperor Sanjō marries a daughter of kampaku Fujiwara no Michinaga.
- 1016 (Chōwa 4, 11th month): A great fire broke out in the Imperial palace; and it was reduced to cinders.
- March 10, 1016 (Chōwa 5, 29th day of the 1st month): In the 5th year of Emperor Sanjō's reign (三条天皇5年), he abdicated; and the succession (‘‘senso’’) was received by a cousin. Shortly thereafter, Emperor Go-Ichijō is said to have acceded to the throne (‘‘sokui’’).

== Notes ==
Preceded by Kankō	Era or nengō Chōwa; 1012–1017	Succeeded by Kannin
