= Kannin =

Period of Japanese history (1017–1021 CE)

Kannin (寛仁) was a Japanese era name (年号, nengō, lit. "year name") after Chōwa and before Jian. This period spanned the years from April 1017 through February 1021. The reigning emperor was Go-Ichijō-tennō (後一条天皇).

== Change of era ==
- 1017 Kannin 1 (寛仁元年): The era name was changed to mark an event or series of events. The previous era ended and a new one commenced in Chōwa 6, on the 23rd day of the 4th month of 1017.

== Events of the Kannin era ==
- June 5, 1017 (Kannin 1, 9th day of the 5th month): The former-Emperor Sanjō died at the age of 42.
- January 22, 1018 (Kannin 2, 3rd day of the 1st month): The emperor celebrated his coming-of-age ceremony.

== Notes ==
Preceded by Chōwa	Era or nengō Kannin; 1017–1021	Succeeded by Jian
