= Aisha (poet) =

ʿĀʾisha bint Aḥmad al-Qurṭubiyya
- Born: Córdoba, Spain
- Died: Córdoba, Spain
- Occupation: Poet

ʿĀʾisha bint Aḥmad al-Qurṭubiyya (d. 1009/1010 CE), sometimes spelled Aysha or al-Qurtubiyya, was a tenth-century poet who primarily wrote in Arabic.

== Biography ==
It is assumed that ʿĀʾisha was born in Córdoba, Spain. She is regarded as both a famed poet and calligrapher of Andalusia. Little is known about her life and background, though it does seem clear that she was the sister of Muḥammad b. Aḥmad b. Qādim (d. 990 CE). Other claims include that she was a princess of Cordova; that her father's full name was Aḥmad b. Muḥammad b. Qādim b. Ziyād; and that she was the niece of the Cordovan physician and poet Abū ʿAbdallāh b. Qādim al-Ṭabīb. Apparently she was a virgin throughout her life, never marrying. Her death came at the beginning of the Fitna of al-Andalus in 1009. 'Ibn Ḥayyān (d. 469/1076), quoted in Ibn Bashkuwāl's (d. 578/1183) Ṣila, praises, among other qualities, ʿĀʾisha's intelligence, her knowledge of literature and poetry, and her eloquence. Her handwriting was beautiful, and she made a practice of copying in her own hand the Qurʾān (maṣāḥif) and secular books (dafātir). She showed a great interest in science (ʿilm), which led her to collect books in what became a large and beautiful library.'

== Poetry ==
Aisha's poetic works are included in writing on medieval Moorish women poets, noted for their surprising vitality, freshness, and aggressive boldness. Her poems were often received with applause in the Royal Academy at Cordova. One of her most famous works is a poem turning down a marriage proposal by a male poet. One example of Aisha bint Ahmad al-Qurtubiya's writing is:

I am a lioness
and will never allow my body
to be anyone's resting place. But if I did,
I wouldn't yield to a dog ─
and O! the lions I've turned away!

Her works included panegyrics addressed to contemporary rulers. A surviving example is a panegyric to Abd al-Malik al-Muzaffar (r. 1002–8 CE).

== Legacy ==
Aisha is included in the list of Notable Muslims in the 2002 special edition of Saudi Aramco World.

Aisha is a featured figure in Judy Chicago's installation piece The Dinner Party, being represented as one of the 999 names on the Heritage Floor.
