= Chōryaku =

Period of Japanese history (1037-1040 AD)

Chōryaku (長暦) was a Japanese era (年号, nengō; lit. "year name") after Chōgen and before Chōkyū. This period spanned the years from April 1037 through 1040. The reigning emperor was Go-Suzaku-tennō (後朱雀天皇).

== Change of era ==
- 1037 Chōryaku gannen (長暦元年): The new era name was created to mark an event or series of events. The previous era ended and the new one commenced in Chōgen 10, on the 21st day of the 4th month of 1037.

== Events of the Chōryaku era ==
- 1037 (Chōryaku 1, 2nd day of the 7th month): The eldest son of Emperor Go-Suzaku (Prince Chikihito, who was would become Emperor Go-Reizei) has his coming of age ceremony.
- 1037 (Chōryaku 1, 17th day of the 8th month): Go-Suzaku formally names Chikihito as his heir and Crown Prince.
- 1038 (Chōryaku 2, 1st day of the 9th month): Fujiwara no Chikaie was killed by a servant during an attempted robbery; and all the greats of the Fujiwara went into mourning.

== Notes ==
Preceded by Chōgen	Era or nengō Chōryaku; 1037–1040	Succeeded by Chōkyū
