= Eien =

Period of Japanese history (987–988 CE)

Eien (永延) was a Japanese era (年号, nengō; lit. "year name") after Kanna and before Eiso. This period spanned the years from April 987 through August 988. The reigning emperor was Ichijō-tennō (一条天皇).

== Change of era ==
- January 2, 987 Eien gannen (永延元年): The new era name was created to mark an event or a number of events. The previous era ended and a new one commenced in Kanna 3, on the 5th day of the 4th month in the year 987.

== Events of Eien era ==
- 987 (Eien 1, 10th month): The emperor paid a visit to the home of Fujiwara no Kaneie.
- 987 (Eien 1, 11th month): The emperor visited Iwashimizu Hachiman-gū.
- 987 (Eien 1, 12th month): The emperor visited the Kamo Shrine.
- 988 (Eien 2, 8th month): Fujiwara no Kaneie invited a number of courtiers to his home where he entertained them in a grand manner.
- 988 (Eien 2, 11th month): The emperor visited the home of Kaneie to join him in celebrating the courtier's 60th birthday.

== Notes ==
Preceded by Kanna	Era or nengō Eien; 987–988	Succeeded by Eiso
