= Manju (era) =

Period of Japanese history (1024–1028 CE)

Manju (万寿) was a Japanese era name (年号, nengō, literally "year name") after Jian and before Chōgen. This period spanned the years from July 1024 through July 1028. The reigning emperor was Go-Ichijō-tennō (後一条天皇).

== Change of era ==
- 1024 Manju gannen (万寿元年): The new era name was created to mark an event or series of events. The previous era ended and the new one commenced in Jian 4, on the 13th day of the 7th month of 1024.

== Events of the Manju era ==
- 1024 (Manju 1): Fujiwara no Kintō withdrew from his public duties; and he retired to Kitayama in the north of Kyoto.
- May 4, 1026 (Manju 3, 15th day of the 4th month): a partial lunar eclipse.
- June 16, 1026 : A tsunami strikes the coast of Iwami Province, killing more than 1,000 people.
- 1027 (Manju 4): Fujiwara no Michinaga died at age 62.

== Notes ==
Preceded by Jian	Era or nengō Manju; 1024–1028	Succeeded by Chōgen
