= Vijayanandi =

Indian mathematician (940–1010)

Vijayanandi or Vijayananda (c. 940, Benares (now Varanasi), India – c. 1010, India) was an Indian mathematician and astronomer who made contributions to trigonometry.

Son of Jayananda, the only known information is that he wrote a work called the Karanatilaka known only from an Arabic translation, Ghurrat al-Zijat , by al-Biruni. There was however another astronomer named Vijayanandi who was referred to by Varahamihira (fl. c. 550) his Pañcasiddhāntikā (XVII, 62) for methods of computing the longitudes of Jupiter and Saturn.

The Karanatilaka includes notes on the units of time, the longitudes of the sun and moon, computation of daylength, eclipse and other such topics.
