= Chōkyū =

Period of Japanese history (1040-1044 AD)

Chōkyū (長久) was a Japanese era name (年号, nengō; literally "year name") after Chōryaku and before Kantoku. This period spanned the years from November 1040 through November 1044. The reigning emperor was Go-Suzaku-tennō (後朱雀天皇).

== Change of era ==
- 1040 Chōkyū gannen (長久元年): The new era name was created to mark an event or series of events. The previous era ended and the new one commenced in Chōryaku 4, on the 10th day of the 11th month of 1040.

== Events of the Chōkyū era ==
- 1040 (Chōkyū 1, 1st day of the 1st month): a partial solar eclipse, predicted for midday, occurred in mid-afternoon. The delay caused complaints about the astronomers' lack of accuracy.
- 1040 (Chōkyū 1, 9th month): The Sacred Mirror was burned in a fire.
- 1041 (Chōkyū 2): The Sanjo Palace burned; and it was reconstructed.

== Notes ==
Preceded by Chōryaku	Era or nengō Chōkyū; 1040–1044	Succeeded by Kantoku
