= Jian (era) =

Period of Japanese history (1021–1024 CE)

Jian (治安) was a Japanese era name (年号, nengō, lit. "year name"), also known as Chi'an, after Kannin and before Manju. This period spanned the years from February 1021 through July 1024. The reigning emperor was Go-Ichijō-tennō (後一条天皇).

== Change of Era ==
- 1021 Jian gannen (治安元年): The era name was changed to mark an event or series of events. The previous era ended and a new one commenced in Kannin 5, on the 2nd day of the 2nd month of 1021.

== Events of the Jian era ==
- 1023 (Jian 3, 4th month): An epidemic in Kyoto was so severe that there were corpses in the streets; disease spread throughout the country.
- 1023 (Jian 3, 10th month): Fujiwara no Michinaga visits Mt. Koya.
- December 29, 1023 (Jian 3, 14th day of the 11th month): a lunar eclipse.

== Notes ==
Preceded by Kannin	Era or nengō Jian; 1021–1024	Succeeded by Manju
