= Kankō =

Period of Japanese history (1004–1012 CE)

Kankō (寛弘) was a Japanese era name (年号, nengō, lit. "year name") after Chōhō and before Chōwa. This period spanned the years from July 1004 through December 1012. The reigning emperors were Ichijō-tennō (一条天皇) and Sanjō-tennō (三条天皇).

== Change of Era ==
- 1004 Kankō gannen (寛弘元年): The era name was changed to mark an event or series of events. The previous era ended and a new one commenced in Kankō 6, on the 20th day of the 7th month of 1004.

== Events of the Kankō Era ==
- March 17, 1008 (Kankō 5, 8th day of the 2nd month): The former-Emperor Kazan died at the age of 41.
- July 16, 1011 (Kankō 8, 13th day of the 6th month): In the 5th year of Emperor Ichijō's reign (一条天皇5年), he abdicated; and the succession (‘‘senso’’) was received by his cousin. Shortly thereafter, Emperor Sanjō is said to have acceded to the throne (‘‘sokui’’).
- July 15, 1011 (Kankō 8, 22nd day of the 6th month ): Daijō-tennō Ichijō died at the age of 32.
- November 21, 1011 (Kankō 8, 24th day of the 10th month): Daijō-tennō Reizei, who was Emperor Sanjō's father, died at age 62.

== Notes ==
Preceded by Chōhō	Era or nengō Kankō; 1004–1012	Succeeded by Chōwa
