= Fujiwara no Teishi =

Fujiwara no Teishi 藤原定子
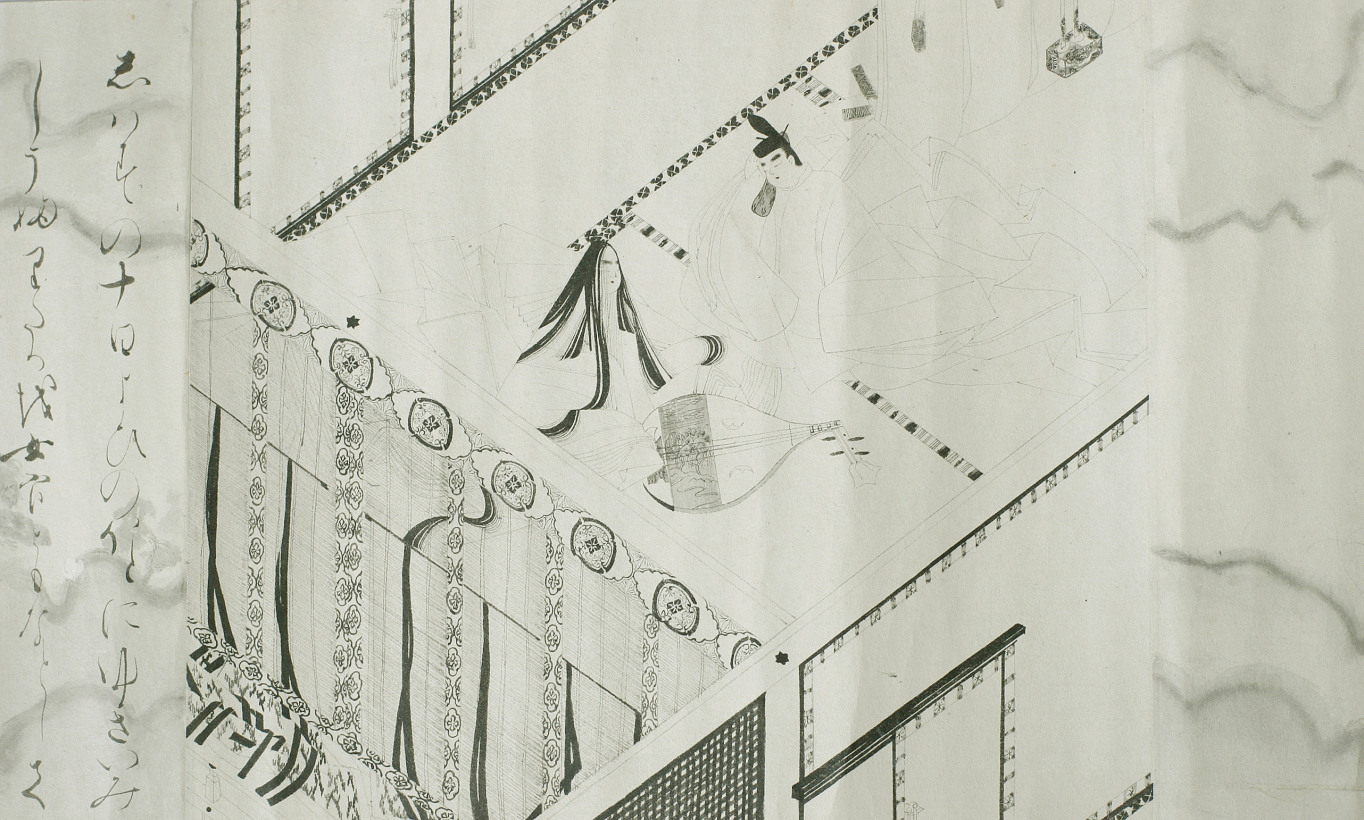

Empress consort of Japan
- Tenure: October 26, 990 – January 13, 1001
- Born: 977
- Died: January 13, 1001 (aged 23–24)
- Spouse: Emperor Ichijō (m. 990)
- Issue: Princess Shushi; Prince Atsuyasu; Princess Bishi
- House: Fujiwara clan (by birth); Imperial House of Japan (by marriage)
- Father: Fujiwara no Michitaka
- Mother: Takashina no Kishi

Fujiwara no Teishi (藤原 定子; 977 – January 13, 1001), also known as Sadako, was an empress consort of the Japanese Emperor Ichijō. She appears in the literary classic The Pillow Book written by her court lady Sei Shōnagon.

== Biography ==
She was the first daughter of Fujiwara no Michitaka. Teishi entered the court in 990 as a junior consort (女御, nyogo) but within the same year was promoted to the rank of empress (中宮, chūgū). She was arranged to marry Emperor Ichijō upon the ceremony of his age of majority. She was given the title of Empress, her father was formally appointed regent to the Emperor, and her sister was later married to the Emperor's cousin and Crown Prince.

=== Empress consort ===
Empress Teishi hosted a literary and cultural court, and Sei Shōnagon was appointed her lady-in-waiting. In 995, a series of events unfolded which deteriorated her position. Her father died in an epidemic that swept through the capital and was succeeded as regent by his rival, her uncle Fujiwara no Michinaga, and her brothers Korechika and Takaie were involved in a scandal that led to their banishment. The issue concerned the former Emperor Kazan who was involved with the same woman as Korechika. The two brothers attempted to scare away Kazan by shooting arrows at the emperor's entourage, one of which pierced the emperor's sleeve; as a result, the brothers were exiled: Korechika to Dazaifu and Takaie to Izumo. The loss of both her father and her brothers greatly weakened the security of Teishi's position in court; a fire at Nijo Mansion also left her virtually homeless. As recounted in The Pillow Book, she was obliged to move to the home of Taira no Narimasa, whose house and gate were significantly below her high rank as a member of court and thus humiliating. Per the account of the Eiga Monogatari, as her brothers were taken away from the palace, Teishi, who was pregnant, picked up a pair of scissors and cut her hair in an attempt to become a Buddhist nun, although this was not considered religiously valid as it was done by her own hand.

In 999, Teishi gave birth to a son. However, when she had returned to the palace after giving birth, the new regent, Teishi's uncle, had made his daughter, Fujiwara no Shōshi, the second consort of the Emperor, and secured the title Empress for her as well. for the first time in Japan, the Emperor had two Empresses, Shōshi with the title chūgū and Teishi, who had previously been titled as chūgū, was titled as the kōgō (皇后). Although both titles mean empress, this was an overt demotion for Teishi; the terms remained in use going forward with the chūgū referring to the higher-ranking, and usually younger, empress. This created fierce rivalry between the two Empresses and her last four years was described as a period of humiliation for her.

Because of the competition between her and Shōshi, the second empress, the Kana literature was developed. During Heian Period court culture specifically, women showed the beauty in their ability to write poetry, play instruments, and paint. Teishi's lady in waiting, Sei Shonagon wrote The Pillow Book as a way to gain the Emperor's affection. However, Shōshi's lady in waiting wrote the famous Tale of Genji, which proved to have more impact on Heian society, ultimately promoting her to the rank of Empress as well. The many political rivalries between Teishi and the Emperor would make her delve into a period of depression and exile. Teishi was considered to be devoted to the Emperor as she showed a moral victory over the regent who attempted to divert the Emperor's affections to Shōshi.

Empress Teishi died on the 15th day of the 12th month after giving birth to her daughter Bishi. Her son, Atsuyasu, was adopted by Shōshi in 1004. Atsuyasu was a favourite of his father Emperor Ichijō, but the emperor was unable to declare him as the crown prince due to his lack of familial backing once Shōshi's son was born in 1008. The diary of court calligrapher Fujiwara no Yukinari records that even within a month of the nomination of his son Atsuhira (later Emperor Go-Ichijō), Emperor Ichijō was still considering nominating Atsuyasu for the throne.

== Legacy ==
Her legacy of inspiring The Pillow Book is still maintained today in Japanese society. Because of her depression and social demise, she is remembered as an emotionally charged empress who was able to subdue minimal power from the regency.

== Issue ==
- Imperial Princess Shushi (脩子内親王) (997–1049)
- Imperial Prince Atsuyasu (敦康親王) (999–1019)
- Imperial Princess Bishi (媄子内親王) (1001–1008)

== Notes ==
Japanese royalty
Preceded by Fujiwara no Junshi	Empress consort of Japan; 990–1001	Succeeded by Fujiwara no Shōshi
