= Shōryaku =

Period of Japanese history (990–995 CE)

Shōryaku (正暦) was a Japanese era name (年号, nengō, lit. "year name") after Eiso and before Chōtoku. This period spanned the years from November 990 through February 995. The reigning emperor was Ichijō-tennō (一条天皇).

== Change of era ==
- 990 Shōryaku gannen (正暦元年): The new era name was created to mark an event or a number of events. The previous era ended and a new one commenced in Eiso 3, on the 7th day of the 11th month of 990.

== Events of the Shōryaku era ==
- March 1, 991 (Shōryaku 2, on the 12th day of the 2nd month): The former-Emperor En'yū died at the age of 33.
- 992 (Shōryaku 3): Nara Governor Kujō Kanetoshi constructed a new temple complex named Shoryaku-ji in response to an Imperial edict.

== Notes ==
Preceded by Eiso	Era or nengō Shōryaku; 990–995	Succeeded by Chōtoku
