= Chōtoku =

Period of Japanese history (995–999 CE)

Chōtoku (長徳) was a Japanese era name (年号, nengō; lit. "year name") after Shōryaku and before Chōhō. This period spanned the years from February 995 through January 999. The reigning emperor was Ichijō-tennō (一条天皇).

== Change of era ==
- 995 Chōtoku gannen (長徳元年): The new era name was created to mark an event or a number of events. The previous era ended and a new one commenced in Shōryaku 6, on 22 February 995.

== Events of the Chōtoku era ==
- 995 (Chōtoku 1): Fujiwara no Michinaga is given the office of Udaijin.
- 996 (Chōtoku 2, 7th month): Michinaga become Sadaijin; and Fujiwara no Akimitsu is named Udaijin.

== Notes ==
Preceded by Shōryaku	Era or nengō Chōtoku; 995–999	Succeeded by Chōhō
