= Geleshan (disambiguation) =

Geleshan may refer to:

- Geleshan (歌乐山街道), a subdistrict in Shapingba District, Chongqing
- Geleshan Mountain Range, in which the subdistrict is named after
- Gele Mountain or Geleshan, located in the Geleshan Mountain Range
- Geleshan National Forest Park (歌乐山国家森林公园), a nationally protected park
