= Shudao =

System of mountain roads in China

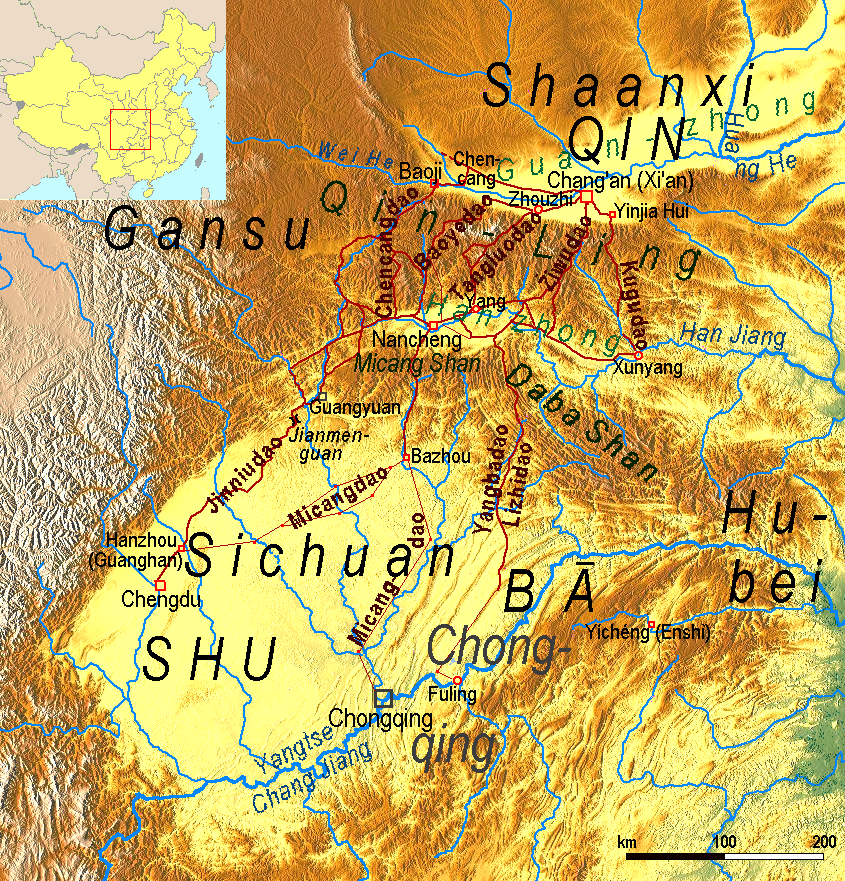
The ancient roads from Qin (Shaanxi) to Shu (Sichuan); = city, = county (县, xiàn), thin lines = ill documented

The Shudao (Chinese: 蜀道; pinyin: Shǔdào), or the Road(s) to Shu, is a system of mountain roads linking the Chinese province of Shaanxi with Sichuan (Shu), built and maintained since the 4th century BC. Technical highlights were the gallery roads, consisting of wooden planks erected on wooden or stone beams slotted into holes cut into the sides of cliffs.

== Geography ==
The roads join three adjacent basins separated and surrounded by high mountains. The northern basin is called Guanzhong ("between the passes"). It is drained by the Yellow River. In ancient times it was the heart of the state of Qin, nowadays it is the central region of Shaanxi. To the south it is bounded by the Qinling Mountains. South of that range is the Hanzhong basin, drained by the Han River, a tributary of the Yangtze. The Hanzhong basin is divided from the Sichuan basin by mountain ranges called the Micang Shan (米倉山/米仓山, Mǐcāng Shān, "Rice Granary Mountains") in the west and Daba Mountains in the east. The Sichuan basin and the Hanzhong basin both drain into the Yangtze.

Like many ancient road systems, the Shu Roads formed a network of major and minor roads with different roads being used at different historical times. However, a number of roads are commonly identified as the main routes. There were five such main roads across the Qinling Mountains, counting from west to east:

- Chencang Road (陈仓道, Chéncāng Dào) is named after the city of Chencang near present-day Baoji, literally "Chen Granary".
- Baoxie Road (褒斜道, Bāoxié Dào) is named after two rivers, the Baoshui and Xiéshuǐ (斜水), modern Shitou River (石头河), one of tributaries of Wei river.
- Tangluo Road (傥骆道, Tǎngluò Dào) is named after the Camel Gorge (駱峪, Luòyù) in the north and Tangshui River (儻水河, Tǎngshuǐ Hé, "Unrestrained Waters River") in the south.
- Ziwu Road (子午道, Zǐwǔ Dào) is named after Ziwu (子午 "Midnight-Noon" or "Meridian") gorge. It went south from Chang’an and turned west at its southern junction with the main road to Hanzhong.
- Kugu Road (库谷道, Kùgǔ Dào), is named after the valley 库谷 (Kùgǔ, "Warehouse Valley") or 库峪 (Kùyù, "Warehouse Gorge"), which reached the Han River at today's Xunyang County (旬阳), where it turned west to reach the central part of the Hanzhong Basin.

The Lianyun Road (连云道, Liányún Dào, "Cloud Linking Road") was a connection between the first two.

Between Hanzhong and the Sichuan basin, there were three main Shu roads:

- Jinniu Road (金牛道, Jīnniú Dào, "Golden Ox Road") also called the Shiniu Road (石牛道, Shíniú Dào, "Stone Cattle Road") to Chengdu, the capital of Sichuan, and the ancient capital of the Shu state.
- Micang Road (米仓道/米倉道, Mǐcāng Dào, "Rice Granary Road); in the region south of the Micang Mountains. From Bazhou, two routes are diverged, one to Chengdu and one to Chongqing, nowadays the largest city of the Basin. But in the 4th and 3rd centuries BCE, Chongqing had not yet been founded, so the road to Chengdu seems to be the main Shu Road.
- Yàngbā (洋巴道, Yángbā Dào) - or Lychee Road (荔枝道, Lìzhī Dào), the easternmost road, ended east of Chongqing at Fuling) on the Yangtze and was used originally in the Tang period. Fuling was not situated in Shu State, but in the neighbouring Ba state.

The most used stretch of main road in recent times was the Great Post Road, or Great Road, that stretched from Beijing to Chengdu and was in operation from the Yuan period to the Republican period. Postal stations, rest stops and garrisons were established along the length of the road. Its Shu Road section was a composite. After Xi’an it used linking roads through Guanzhong, then sections of the Chencang Road, the Lianyun Road, and the Baoye Road to reach the Han Basin. It then joined the Jinniu Road to Chengdu.

== History ==
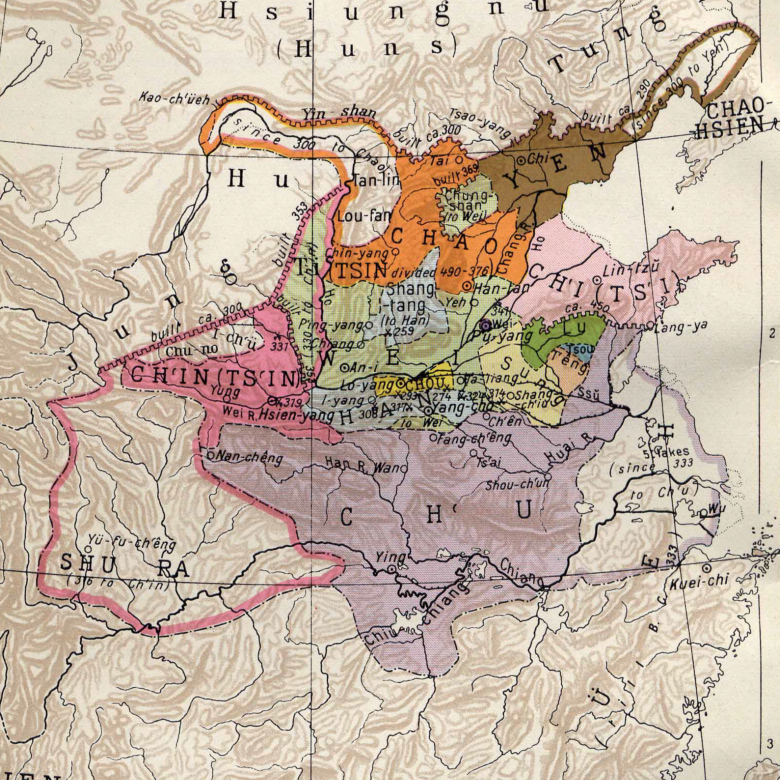
China in the Warring States period around 300 BC

In 316 BC, the state of Qin, the capital of which was then Xianyang (near present-day Xi'an), conquered Shu and its eastern neighbour, the Ba Federation. Related to this conquest, the first roads were built through the mountains. Of the Golden Ox Road there is a tale that the ruler of Shu had built it in order to send the ruler of Qin a golden ox as a gift. So it is possible that the southern section of this road was constructed by Shu with other roads being built by Qin State.

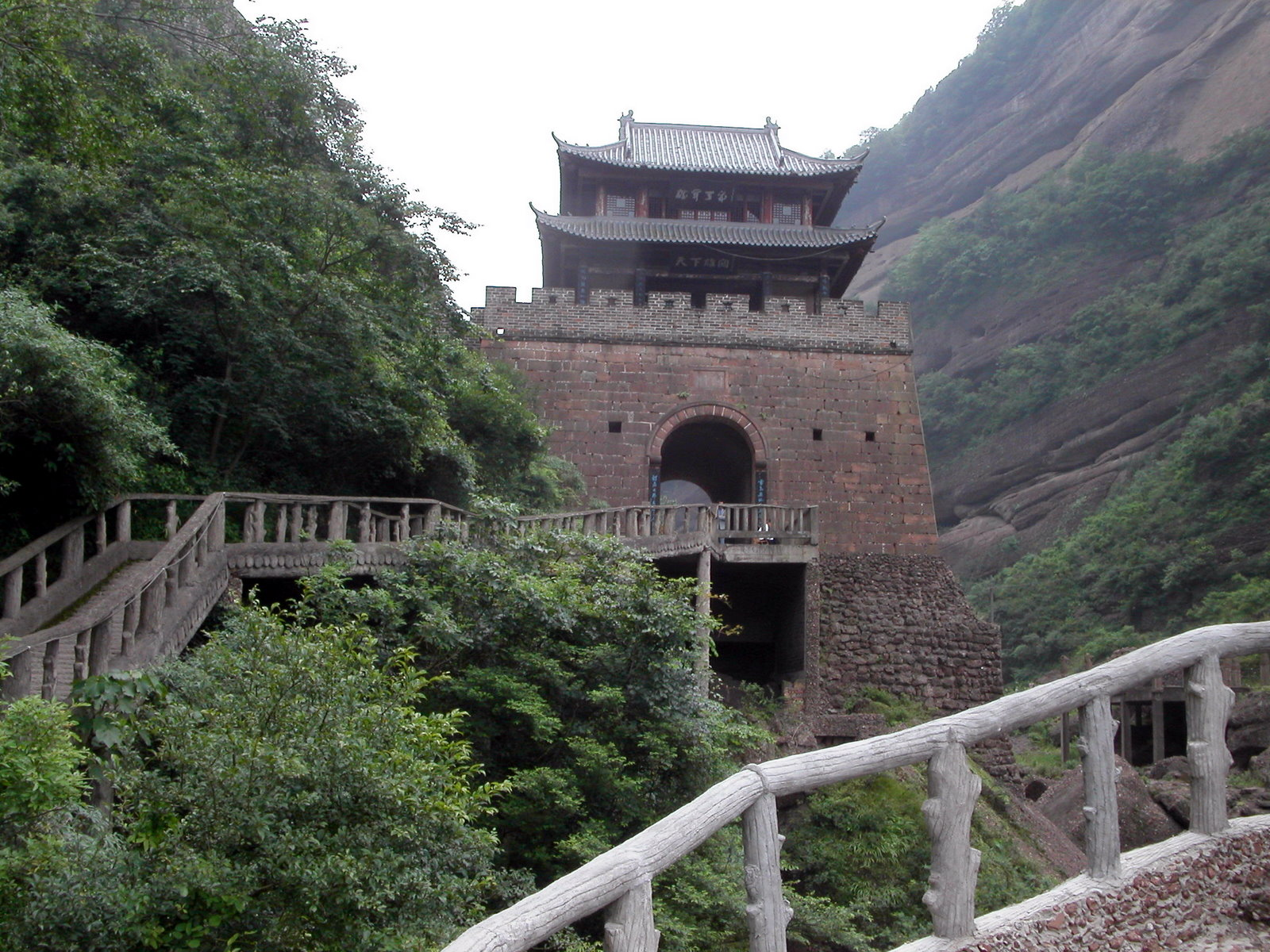
Jinniudao, "Golden Ox Road": reconstructed fort at Jianmen Pass

Over time, sections not consisting of planks were replaced by flagstones and steps. Nevertheless, they were still a challenge for travellers. In the Tang period, Li Bai wrote about the "hard road to Shu", and about "ladders to heaven made of timber and stones". Along the roads fortified control posts and cities were built.

At that time, the Tangluo Road was an official postal road and the Baoye Road was in constant use. It is likely he wrote of one of these roads.

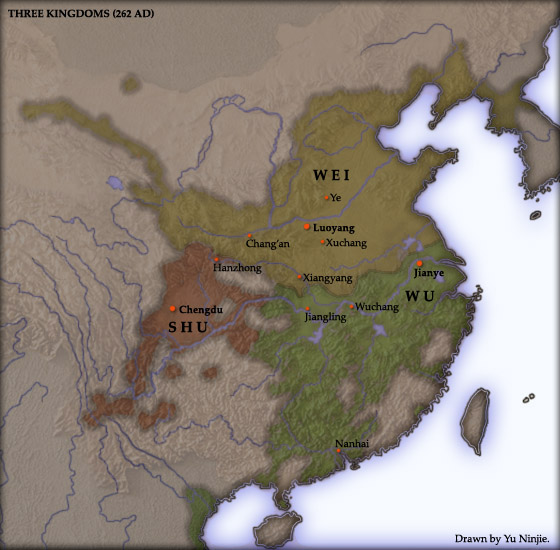
China in the age of the Three Kingdoms

During times of conflict, sections of the plank roads were sometimes burned as a military stratagem. One such conflict was after the overthrow of the Qin dynasty in 206 BC, when the successful leader of the revolt, Xiang Yu, banished his strongest rival Liu Bang to be ruler of the remote kingdoms of Han, Shu and Ba. Retreating with his army to Hanzhong, at the suggestion of his advisor Zhang Liang, Liu destroyed the plank roads immediately after his passage in order to stop any pursuers. Then, to deceive Xiang Yu of his intentions to attack the three vassal kings of Qin, some say he pretended to repair the Plank Roads as his Generalissimo Han Xin took what is now called the Chencang Road to attack Chencang. Even today, Chinese say “openly repair the plank roads, secretly march on Chencang” (明修栈道，暗渡陈仓) to describe this stratagem. Later Liu Bang founded the Han dynasty and in peacetime, the mountain roads were rebuilt. Another example occurred four hundred years later, in the age of the Three Kingdoms. The founder of the state of Shu Han, Liu Bei, had a famous advisor and Prime Minister Zhuge Liang (also called Kongming by his Courtesy name) who made constant use of the Shu Roads to attack the rival state of Cao Wei. Following Kongming's death, Plank Roads were burned on at least two occasions to defend Hanzhong; once by Wei Yan and once by Jiang Wei, but Shu Han was eventually conquered by Cao Wei in 263. Afterwards the Plank Roads were restored and the traffic continued to flow.

On his Asian journey (1271–1295) Marco Polo spent the years 1275 to 1295 in China during the Yuan period. He left a clear description of the Great Road from Khanbaliq (modern Beijing) to Chengdu, and included its major Shu Roads sections. Later, China's centres of population and economy moved out of the western mountain regions to the eastern plains. The flows of traffic changed in the same way. But the Shu Roads remained important for communication between the western basins.

During the tumults at the transition from Ming to Qing period, Sichuan suffered substantially material damage and loss of population through various raids and invasions. Long sections of the Shu Roads fell into disrepair. Under the rule of the Qing dynasty, Sichuan was rebuilt and repopulated, and the Shu Roads were repaired. They remained important routes for traffic until the first decades of the 20th century.

The first modern motor road was opened in Sichuan in 1937 and reached the Guanzhong in 1943. Since that time, long sections of new roads were built along almost the same routes as the former roads. In this way most of the ancient plank roads were destroyed. New plank roads were built for sightseeing and tourists, but they have never served real traffic.
