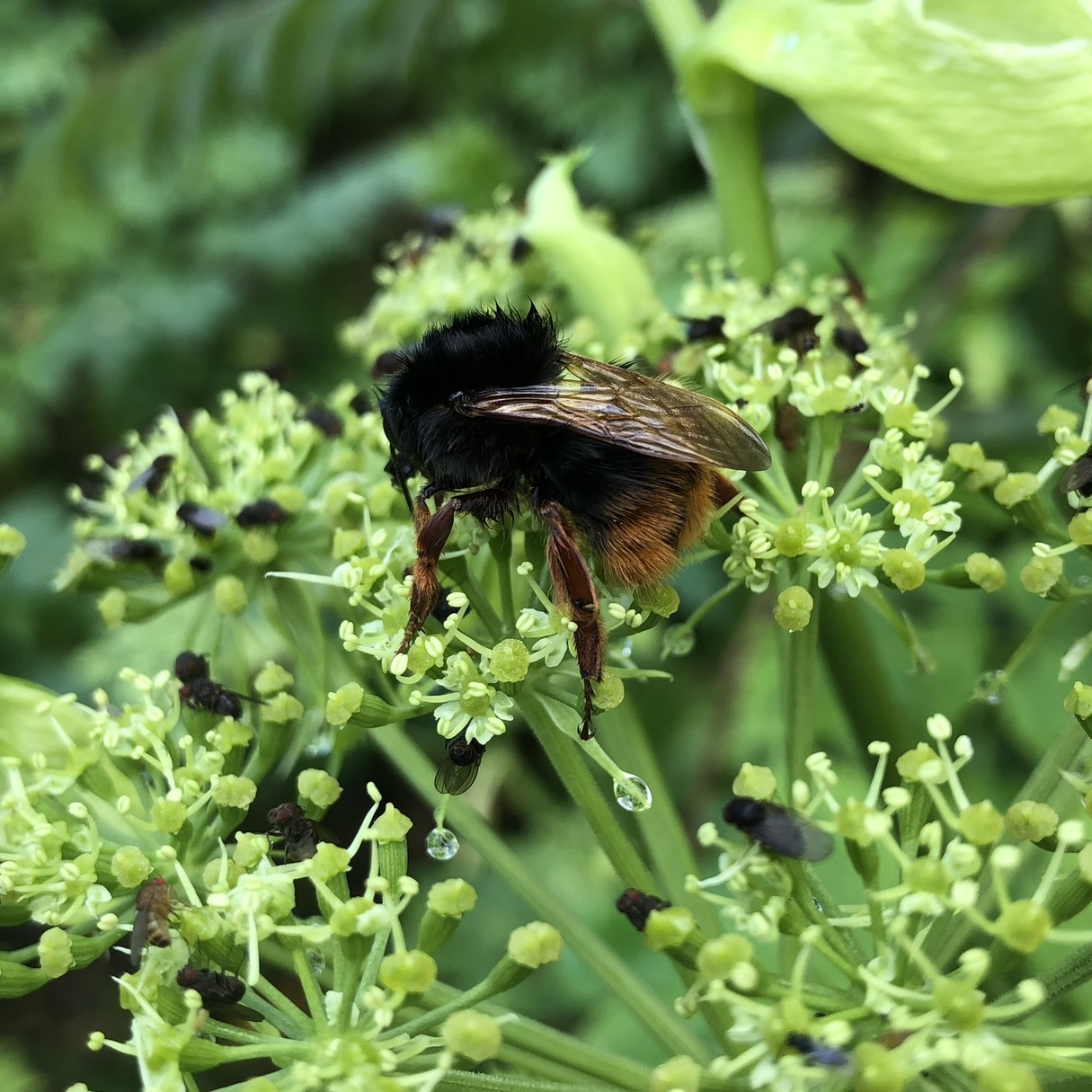
- Chiayi County, Taiwan, 2018

Scientific classification
- Kingdom: Animalia
- Phylum: Arthropoda
- Class: Insecta
- Order: Hymenoptera
- Family: Apidae
- Genus: Bombus
- Subgenus: Melanobombus
- Species: B. eximius

Binomial name
- Bombus eximius (Smith, 1852)
- Collection locations

= Bombus eximius =

Species of bee

Bombus eximius is a species of bumblebee that belongs to the subgenus Melanobombus in the simplified subgeneric classification. It is found in the Southern, Eastern and Southeastern parts of the Asian continent.

== Characteristics ==
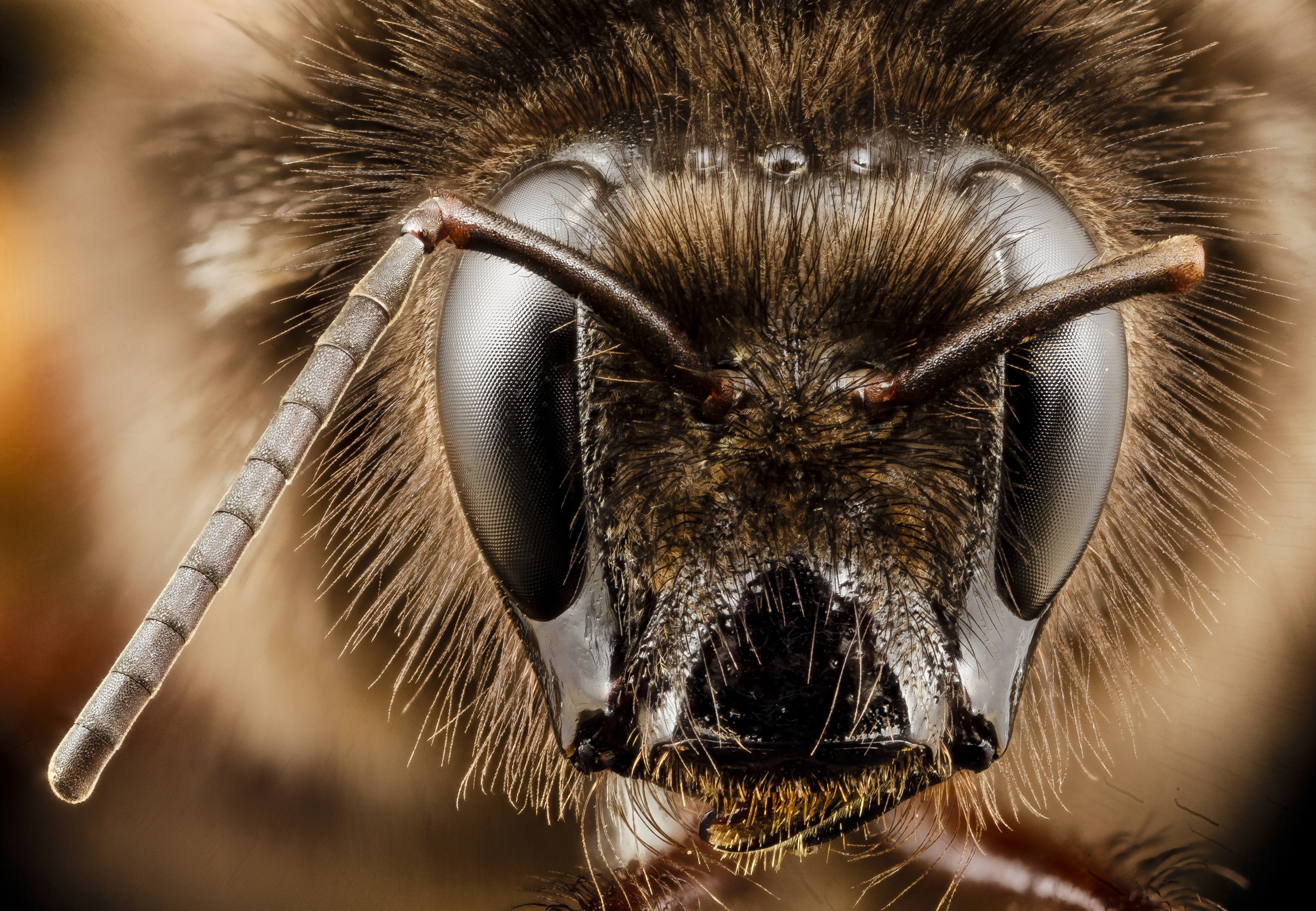
Face of Bombus eximius

Bombus eximius is a very large species of bumblebee. The queens are 28–29 mm (1.1 in) long, while the female workers are 14–19 mm (0.55–0.75 in) and the male workers 18–19 mm (0.71–0.75 in). The color of the hair on the thorax is black, and that on the mid and hind tibiae and the basitarsus is orange. The bright coloration has also been described as "yellowish red" (via German: gelblichrot).

This species can easily be misidentified as Bombus flavescens.

The close-up view of the face of Bombus eximius shows the oculomandibular distance (OMD), i.e., the distance between the compound eye and the mandible, to be 0.9–1.0 times the mandible breadth. The labrum, i.e., lips, have irregular lamella, but are mostly straight. The inner eye margin has scattered large punctures.

== Ecology ==
The species is relatively uncommon in low altitude areas between 450–1,200 m (1,480–3,940 ft) around the Sichuan basin area. It has been found in the Himalayan region, Myanmar, Thailand, Vietnam, China (Yunnan, Tibet, Sichuan, Fujian, Jiangxi, Guangdong, Guangxi, Guizhou), Taiwan and in Japan.
