= Jianmen Pass =

Mountain pass in Sichuan, China

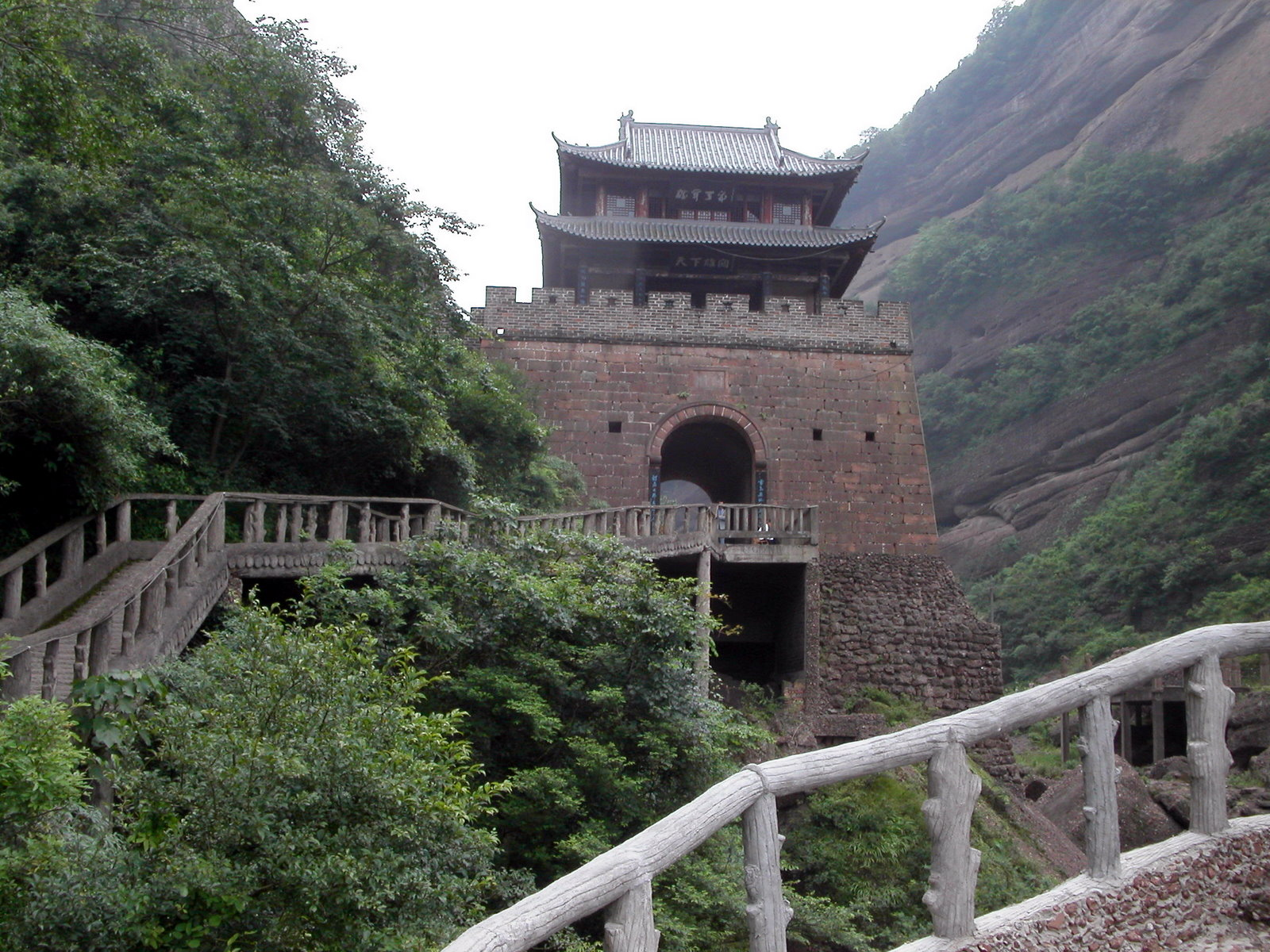
- Jianmen Pass in 2005. The gate structure was burned down in 2006

- Location within Northern China Location within China
- Traversed by: Shudao, G108 (tunnel)

Location
- Location: Northeast Sichuan Province, China
- Range: Longmen Mountains
- Coordinates: 32°12′54″N 105°33′48″E

Jianmen Pass
- Traditional Chinese: 劍門關
- Simplified Chinese: 剑门关
- Literal meaning: Sword Gate Pass
Transcriptions
Standard Mandarin
- Hanyu Pinyin: Jian Men Guān

Jianmen Pass (simplified Chinese: 剑门关; traditional Chinese: 劍門關; pinyin: Jiàn Mén Guān; lit. 'Sword Gate Pass') is a mountain pass located southwest of the city of Guangyuan in Sichuan province. It has also been called "Jianmenguan Pass"; however, that form is redundant since guān means "pass" in Chinese.

== Location ==
Jianmen Pass is located in Jiange County, Guangyuan City of Sichuan Province. The city of Chengdu, which is the capital of Sichuan Province, is less than 200 kilometers south from there. The natural pass is formed by cliffs on the sides of mountains. The gate of the pass was built on the middle part of the Dajian Mountain as a strategic position.

== History ==
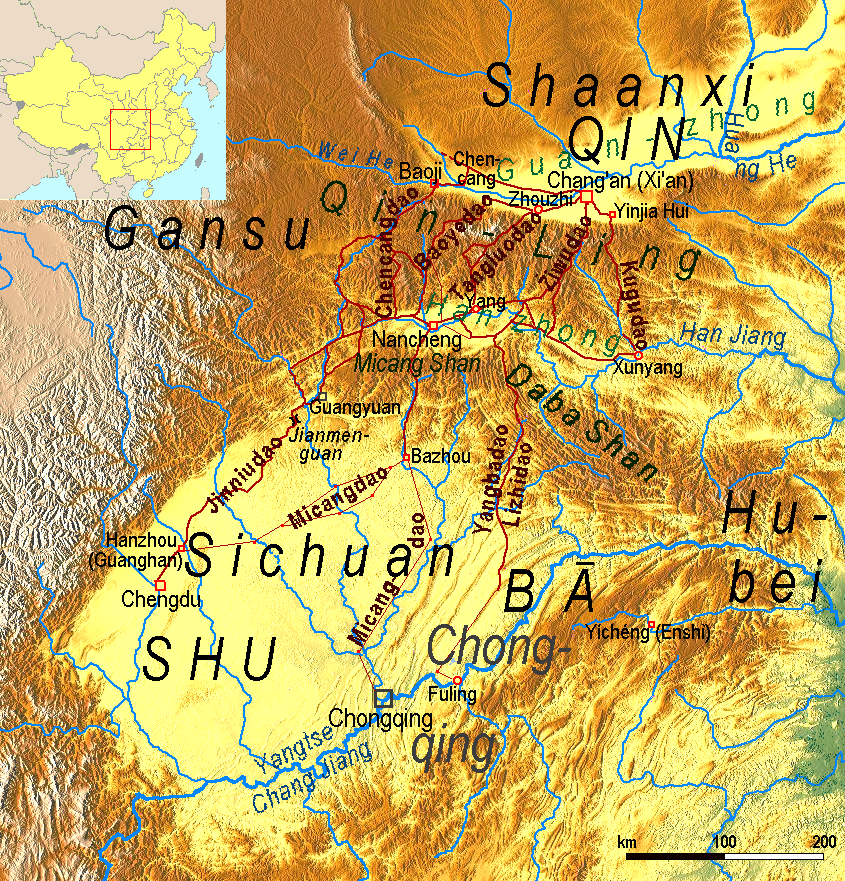
Detailed view of various mountain ranges and passes between Shaanxi and Sichuan

The mountain pass was a part of the Shu Roads. The construction of the gate was related to the Three Kingdoms era strategist, Shu Han chancellor Zhuge Liang. While Zhuge Liang repaired the gallery roads, he found the terrain in Jiange was a naturally perfect place to set up a defensive position for Shu; therefore, he ordered a military gate to be built on the pass. After Zhuge Liang died, his successor Jiang Wei led the army and held the Jianmen Pass against the invasion from Wei. Since then, Jianmen Pass has become a key position and most important pass in three routes into Sichuan.

In 1932, because the local government was building a road across the Jianmen Pass, they demolished the structure which was built in the Ming Dynasty. Only the foundation was left. Later, during the Chinese Civil War, Jianmen Pass was taken by the Communists from the Nationalists.

Jianmen Pass lost its military value but became a major tourist attraction because of its history. In the 1980s, the Chinese government rebuilt the old gate structure. The building was damaged by fire in 2005. The rebuilt gate was heavily damaged again by the 2008 Sichuan earthquake. The current structure was built in 2009.
