= Chaohu Plain =

Alluvial plain in Anhui, China

- Chinese: 巢湖平原
- Country: China
- Type: Alluvial plain

Chaohu Plain (Chinese: 巢湖平原; pinyin: Cháohú píngyuán), also known as Chao Lake Plain, is an alluvial plain located in the central Chaohu area of Anhui Province, with an annual precipitation of about 1,000 mm and a well-developed agriculture.

Chaohu Plain, part of the Middle and Lower Yangtze Plain (长江中下游平原), is dominated by rice and wheat for its agricultural products. It is one of the main grain producing areas in China.
