= Mont Gelé =

Mont Gelé, "frozen mount" in French, may refer to the following mountains

- Mont Gelé (Riddes) above Riddes/Verbier, Valais, Switzerland
- Mont Gelé (Bagnes) on the border between Bagnes, Valais in Switzerland and Valle d'Aosta in Italy

== See also ==
- Gele Mountain, Geleshan National Forest Park, near Chongqing, China
