= North China Plain =

Largest alluvial plain of China

Coordinates: 36°34′48″N 117°09′36″E

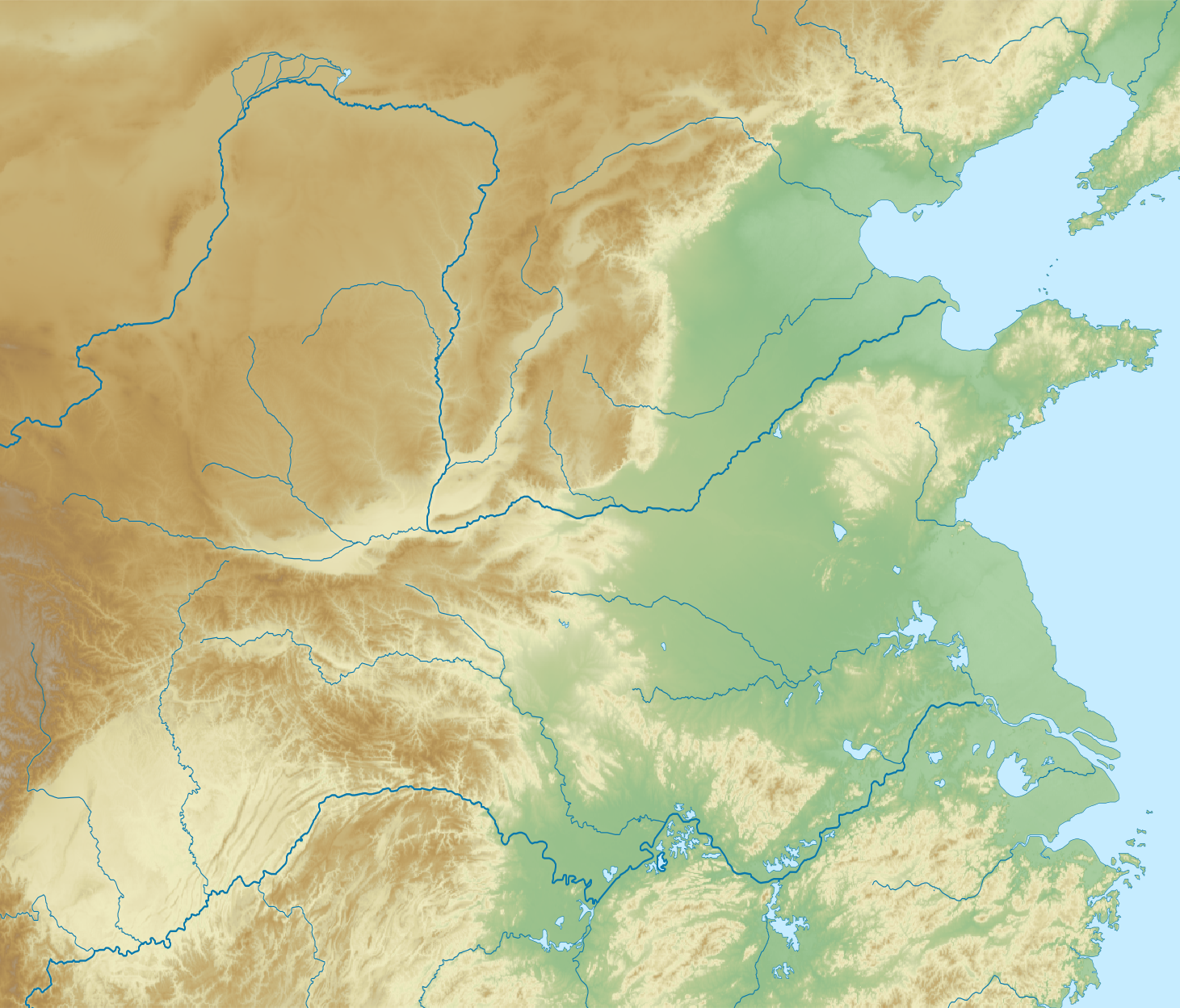
- Traditional Chinese: 華北平原
- Simplified Chinese: 华北平原
- Literal meaning: North China Plain
Transcriptions
Standard Mandarin
- Hanyu Pinyin: Huáběi Píngyuán
- Gwoyeu Romatzyh: Hwabeei Pyngyuan
- Wade–Giles: Huapei P'ingyüan

Alternative Chinese name
- Traditional Chinese: 黃淮海平原
- Simplified Chinese: 黄淮海平原
- Literal meaning: Huang-Huai-Hai Plain
Transcriptions
Standard Mandarin
- Hanyu Pinyin: Huáng-Huái-Hǎi Píngyuán
- Gwoyeu Romatzyh: Hwang-Hwai-Hae Pyngyuan
- Wade–Giles: Huang-Huai-Hai P'ingyüan

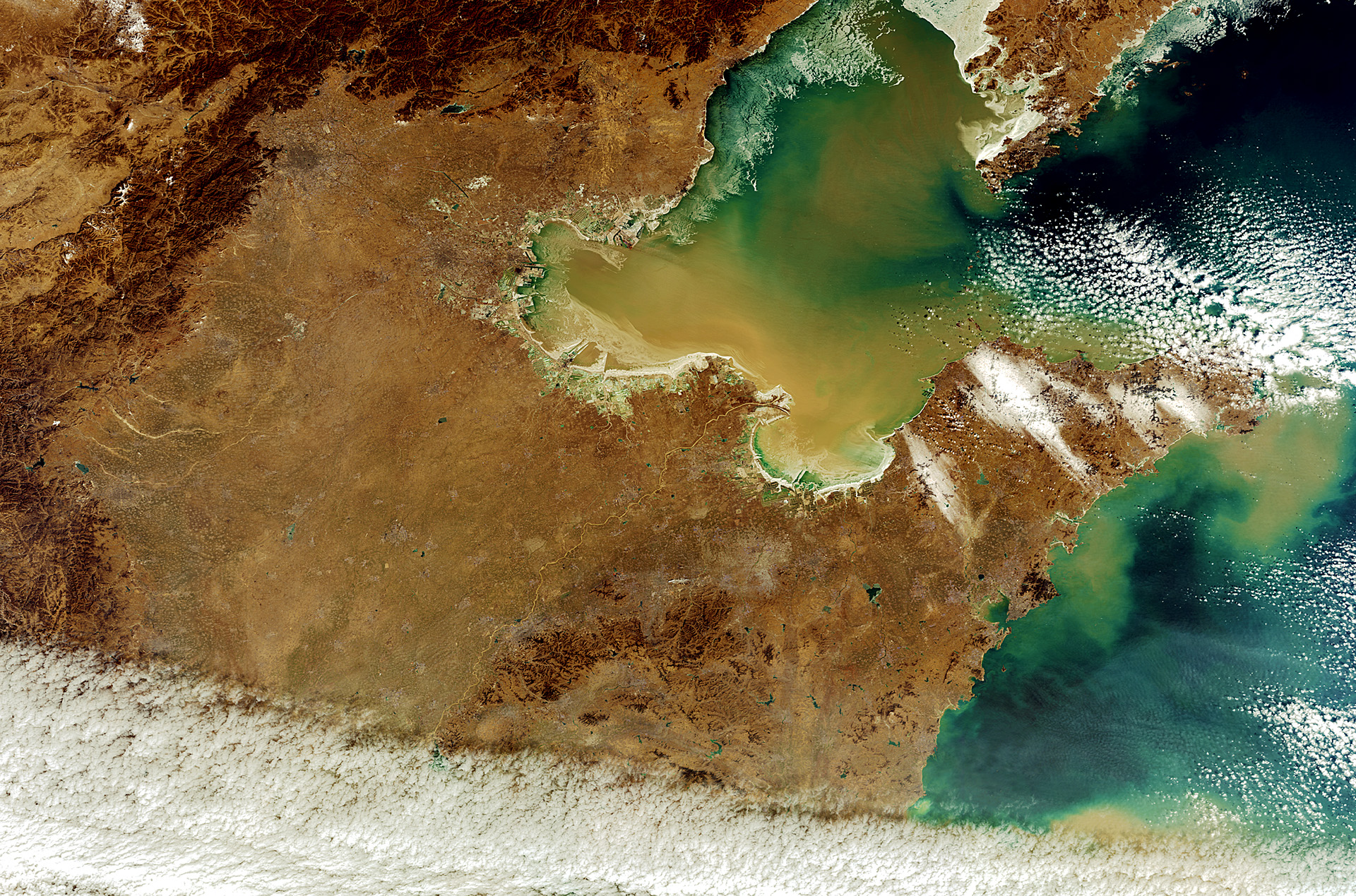
The North China Plain from space

The North China Plain (simplified Chinese: 华北平原; traditional Chinese: 華北平原; pinyin: Huáběi Píngyuán) is a large-scale downfaulted rift basin formed in the late Paleogene and Neogene and then modified by the deposits of the Yellow River. It is the largest alluvial plain of China. The plain is bordered to the north by the Yanshan Mountains, to the west by the Taihang Mountains, to the south by the Dabie Mountains, and to the east by the Yellow Sea and Bohai Sea. The Yellow River flows through the plain, before its waters empty into the Bohai Sea.

The part of the North China Plain around the banks of the middle and lower Yellow River is commonly referred to as the Central Plain (pinyin: Zhōngyuán). This portion of the North China Plain formed the cradle of Chinese civilization, and is the region from which the Han Chinese people emerged.

Beijing, the capital of China, is located on the northeast edge of the plain, with Tianjin, an important industrial city and commercial port, near its northeast coast. Jinan (the capital of Shandong province) and Zhengzhou (the capital of Henan province) lie on the plain as well, along the banks of the Yellow River. Additionally, the capitals of several Imperial Chinese dynasties were located on the plain, including Luoyang (which at various points was the capital of the Han, Jin, Sui, and Tang dynasties) and Kaifeng (the capital of the Northern Song dynasty).

The multipurpose Xiaolangdi Dam marks the location of the Yellow River's last valley before its waters flow onto the North China Plain, a great delta created from silt deposited at the Yellow River's mouth over millennia. The North China Plain encompasses much of Henan, Hebei, and Shandong provinces, as well as the northern portions of Jiangsu and Anhui. Further south, the North China Plain merges with the similarly flat Yangtze Plain.

The North China Plain is fertile, and it is one of the most densely populated regions in the world. The plain is one of China's most important agricultural regions, producing wheat, maize, sorghum, millet, peanuts, sesame seed, cotton, and various vegetables. It is the main area of sorghum, millet, maize, and cotton production in China. In the eastern part of the plain, Shandong's Shengli Oil Field serves as an important petroleum base. Due to its yellow soil, the North China Plain's nickname is "Land of the yellow earth". The plain covers an area of about 409,500 square kilometers (158,100 sq mi), most of which is less than 50 metres (160 ft) above sea level.

== Historical significance ==
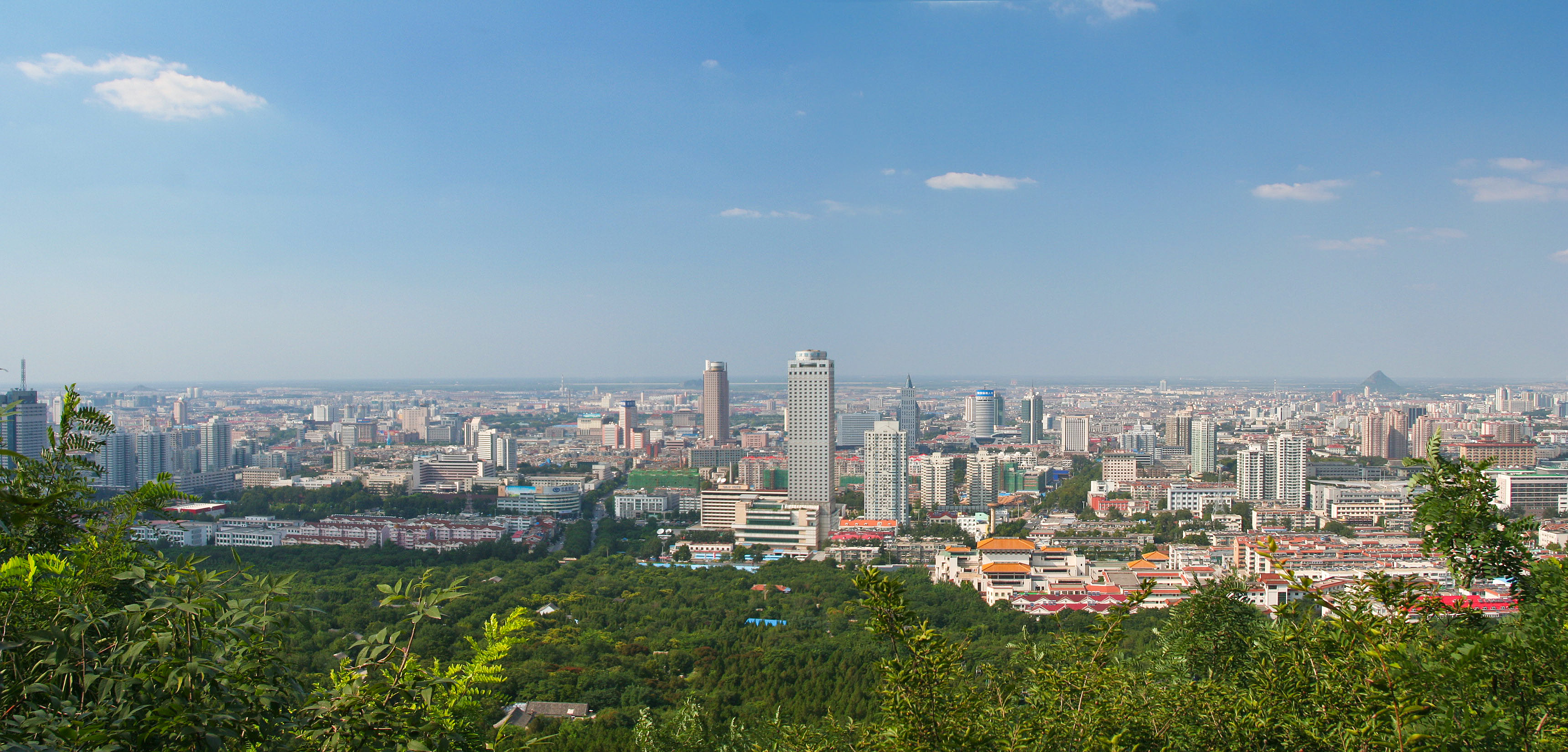
Jinan, the capital of Shandong province

The geography of the North China Plain has had profound cultural and political implications. Unlike areas to the south of the Yangtze, the plain generally runs uninterrupted by mountains and has far fewer rivers. As a result, communication by horse is rapid within the plain, and the spoken language of the plain is relatively uniform, in contrast to the plethora of languages and dialects in southern China. This potential for rapid communication over a large area has meant that the political center of China has tended to be located here.

Because the fertile soil of the North China Plain gradually merges with the steppes and deserts of Dzungaria, Inner Mongolia, and Northeast China, the plain has been prone to invasion from nomadic or semi-nomadic tribes originating from those regions, prompting the construction of the Great Wall of China. Although the soil of the North China Plain is fertile, the weather is unpredictable, being at the intersection of humid winds from the Pacific and dry winds from the interior of the Asian continent. This makes the plain prone to both floods and drought. Moreover, the flatness of the plain promotes massive flooding when river works are damaged. Many historians have proposed that these factors have encouraged the development of a centralized Chinese state to manage granaries, maintain hydraulic works, and administer fortifications against the steppe peoples. (The "hydraulic society" school holds that early states developed in the valleys of the Nile, Euphrates, Indus and Yellow Rivers due to the need to supervise large numbers of laborers to build irrigation canals and control floods.)

Philosophically, the North China Plain was also the birthplace of Confucius, the traditional patriarch of East Asian philosophy. Confucius lived and taught in the State of Lu from 551 to 479 BCE. His teachings, recorded in The Analects, eventually became the school of thought known as Confucianism. Tied to the Classical Chinese writing system, Confucianism swept throughout China and onto Korea, Japan, and Vietnam, heavily influencing their respective political, legal, and educational bureaucracies.

=== Modern history ===
The initial project of the Great Leap Forward was accelerating the construction of waterworks on the North China Plain during the 1957–1958 winter.

== Climate change ==
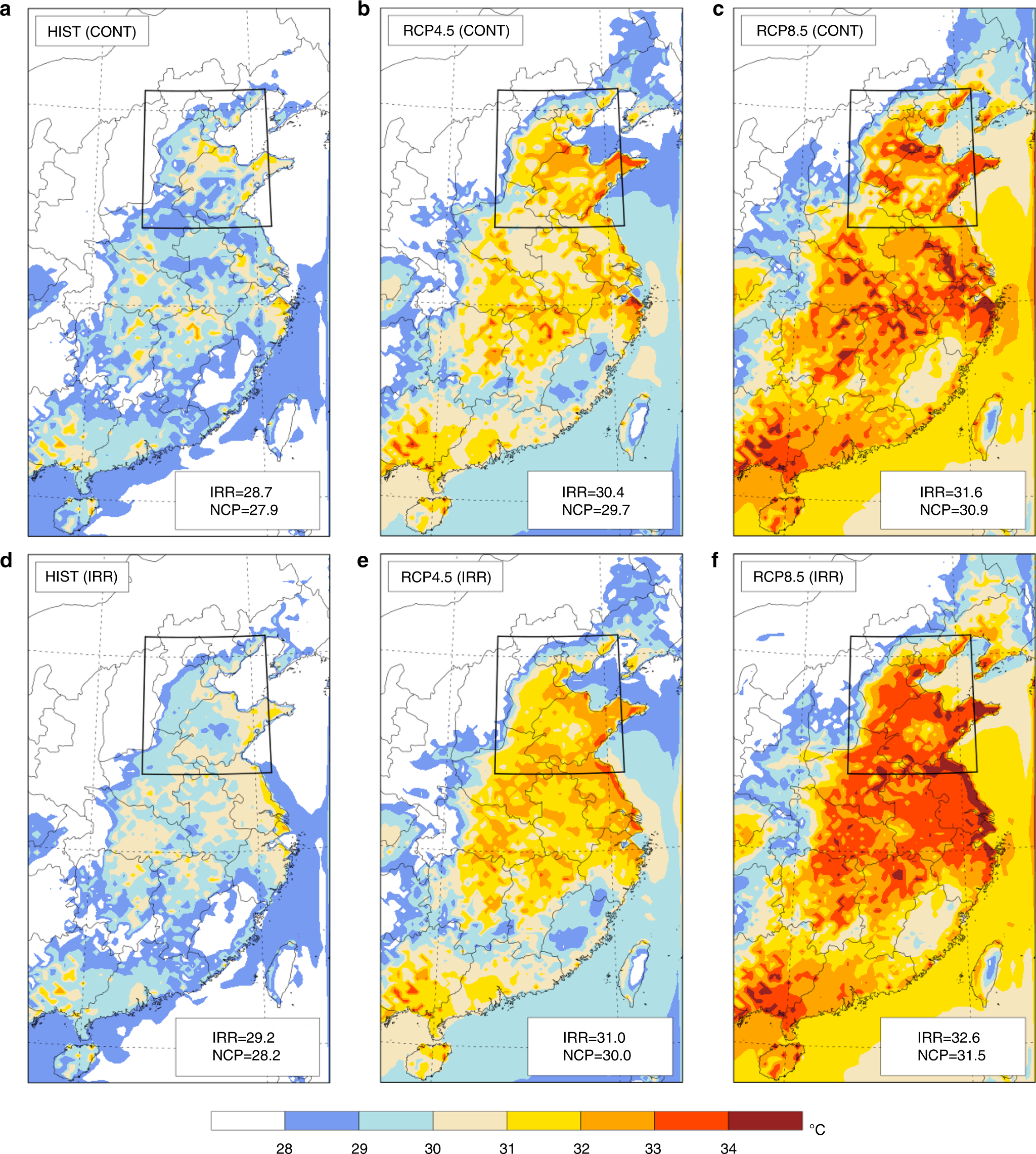
This set of maps shows how the summer heat stress over the North China Plain would change between now at the end of the century under RCP4.5 and RCP8.5, the scenarios of "moderate" and intense climate change. It also shows how irrigation would exacerbate heat stress compared to a counterfactual where it is absent.

As climate change increases the Earth's average temperature, and has a disproportionate effect on extreme temperatures, it will also increase heat stress felt in areas that are already hot and/or with high humidity. The North China Plain is expected to be highly affected, as the region's extensive irrigation networks result in unusually moist air. In scenarios without aggressive action to stop climate change, the worst heatwaves are projected to become severe enough to cause mass mortality in agricultural labourers working outdoors. Under the most extreme climate change scenario, the warming reached by 2100 would be sufficient to cause such heatwaves across the North China Plain approximately once per decade.
