= Chongqing Communication Institute =

University in Chongqing, China

Coordinates: 29°59′54.79″N 106°14′26.68″E

- Simplified Chinese: 中国人民解放军重庆通信学院
- Traditional Chinese: 中國人民解放軍重慶通信學院
Transcriptions
Standard Mandarin
- Hanyu Pinyin: Zhōngguó Rénmín Jiěfàngjūn Chóngqìng Tōngxìn Xuéyuàn

Chongqing Communication Institute (Chinese: 中国人民解放军重庆通信学院), also known as Chongqing Telecommunication Institute, is a college located in Geleshan, Shapingba District in the Chinese municipality of Chongqing. Founded in 1950, the college is best known for its contribution to the field of information technology. It is well-known as "the birthplace of digital communication in China."

== Campus ==
The campus covers more than 300,000 square meters, and includes teaching, research and living facilities, a state-of-the-art teaching building, a communication laboratory, an electrical engineering building, and an automation laboratory. The college's library contains more than 60 million issues of various journals, providing a useful collection of digital literature.

Additionally, the college has a modern educational technology training center, a research center, a network management center, an electronic reading room, and a practice facility. For recreation, it offers three football fields, over twenty basketball courts, as well as other sports and cultural facilities. The campus also has a digital network, computer center, multimedia classrooms, language labs, an EDA specializing room, a DSP laboratory, and computer simulation laboratories.

== Academics ==
The school offers instruction in communication and information systems, signal and information processing, control theory, and control engineering. Graduate degrees in Applied Computer Technology, Educational Technology, Pattern Recognition, and Intelligent Systems are available.

General education courses cover topics such as engineering, science, management science, education, communications, computer science, information security, photography, English, and television production.

40% of faculty are Associate Professors, and 62% of faculty hold master's or doctoral degrees.
