= Stone Cattle Road =

Historical road in China

The Stone Cattle Road (Chinese: 石牛道; pinyin: Shíniú Dào) was an ancient Chinese road over the Qinling Mountains used by the state of Qin to conquer modern Sichuan and Chongqing in 316 BC.

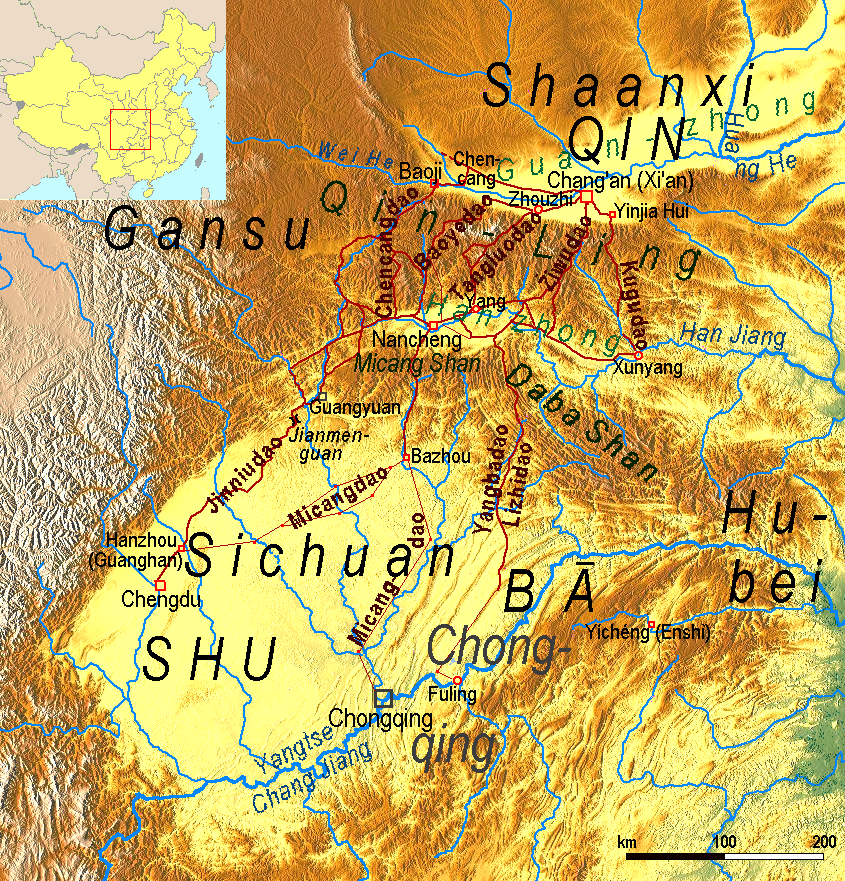
Roads to the Sichuan Basin

== Story ==
The story goes that King Huiwen of Qin on the Wei River wished to conquer the kingdom of Shu and Ba to the south over the impassable Qinling Mountains in the Sichuan Basin. Knowing of the King of Shu's fondness for treasure, he had his sculptors make five life-sized stone cows with gold tails and hindquarters with gold and placed them where the Shu ambassadors could see them. When the king of Shu heard of this, he thought it would be good to fertilize his treasury with golden cowpats, so he asked the king of Qin to send the cattle. The king of Qin replied that he was glad to do so, but the cattle were delicate and that to deliver them it would first be necessary to build a gallery road over the mountains. When this Stone Cattle Road was completed in 316 BC, he used it to invade and conquer Shu. Sage gives a slightly different version of the story. Another source mentions a Golden Ox Road (Chinese: 金牛道; pinyin: Jīnniú dào) which passes through the western end of the Qinling Mountains over the Tianshaling and Wuting passes. Legend says it was built to seize oxen of a similar nature that lived in the mountains.

== History ==
In order to reach Sichuan from Qin one must travel southward over the difficult Qinling Mountains to the Han River basin and then southwest over the Daba Mountains to the Sichuan Basin. Naturally there were footpaths, but sending an army, and the later extraction of tribute, required a road suitable for wheeled vehicles. For the more difficult sections, a gallery road had to be constructed. Horizontal holes were bored into the rock and logs inserted in them. Where possible, vertical logs were placed to support the outer ends and the whole was covered with planks. (In 1979 Chinese archeologists located 56 horizontal holes and 190 vertical holes in 22 different locations.) If the Qin invasion of 316BC was a sudden decision provoked by the Marquis of Zu's quarrel with the King of Shu then the road, or part of it, must have been in place before this. The more difficult northern part was in Qin territory, the southern part in Shu and the middle part in Ba, although the exact boundaries are not clear. Most of the expense and engineering must have come from Qin. Given that the distance from the Wei valley to Chengdu is about 500 kilometers, it is unlikely that the whole road was built at once.

Sage remarks that "determining the Qinling portion of the route was once one of those perennial quibbles like the attempts to find Hannibal's path through the Alps." His view is that the Qinling portion corresponds to the Baoxie Plank Road. This ran from southeast of the Qin capital of Yong, up the north-flowing Xie River, over a pass west of Mount Taibai and southwest down the Bao River to Hanzhong on the Han River. From there it went west-southwest over the Daba Mountains using the Wu Deng Pass ('Wu Deng' were the 'Five Strongmen' who carried the cattle to Shu) and entered the Sichuan Basin at the Jian Men or Sword Gate, a route that is similar to the modern Xi'an-Chengdu highway. Sage thinks that the Stone Cattle Road proper was the segment south of the Daba Mountains, although the term was used loosely for the whole route. There was also an 'old road' ('gu dao') west of the Qinling portion which Liu Bang used for his initial breakout of the Han valley. This probably corresponds to the modern S210 highway. After the conquest there was a 'Rice Granary Road' that went south from Hanzhong and then swung west. As Sichuan became more developed there were other roads of greater or lesser importance.
