= Geleshan National Forest Park =

Protected area in Chongqing, China

- 歌乐山国家森林公园
- IUCN category II (national park)
- Location within China
- Location: Shapingba District, Chongqing Municipality
- Nearest city: Chongqing
- Coordinates: 29°34′04″N 106°25′39″E
- Area: 16 km^{2} (6.2 sq mi)

The Geleshan National Forest Park (Chinese: 歌乐山国家森林公园; pinyin: Gēlèshān guójiā sēnlín gōngyuán) or Gele Mountain National Forest Park, is a nationally protected park in China, located in Geleshan, Shapingba District, 16 km west of Chongqing city centre.

== Etymology ==
In Chinese, gēlè (歌乐) means to sing and dance. According to legends, Gele Mountain obtained its name from ancient times when Yu the Great (Chinese: 大禹; pinyin: Dà Yǔ, c. 2200 – 2101 BC) supposedly invited guests to sing and dance on the mountain to celebrate the success of controlling local floods.

== Physical features ==
Due to its mountainous landscapes and lush green forests, which consist mostly of pine and cypress, Geleshan is poetically referred to as the "Emerald Fortress" (Chinese: 山城绿宝石; pinyin: Shānchéng Lǜbǎoshí). Natural features of the park also include prairie meadows, streams, springs, caves, and waterfalls.

The highest point of Geleshan National Forest Park is 693 metres (2273.62 ft).

== Activities ==
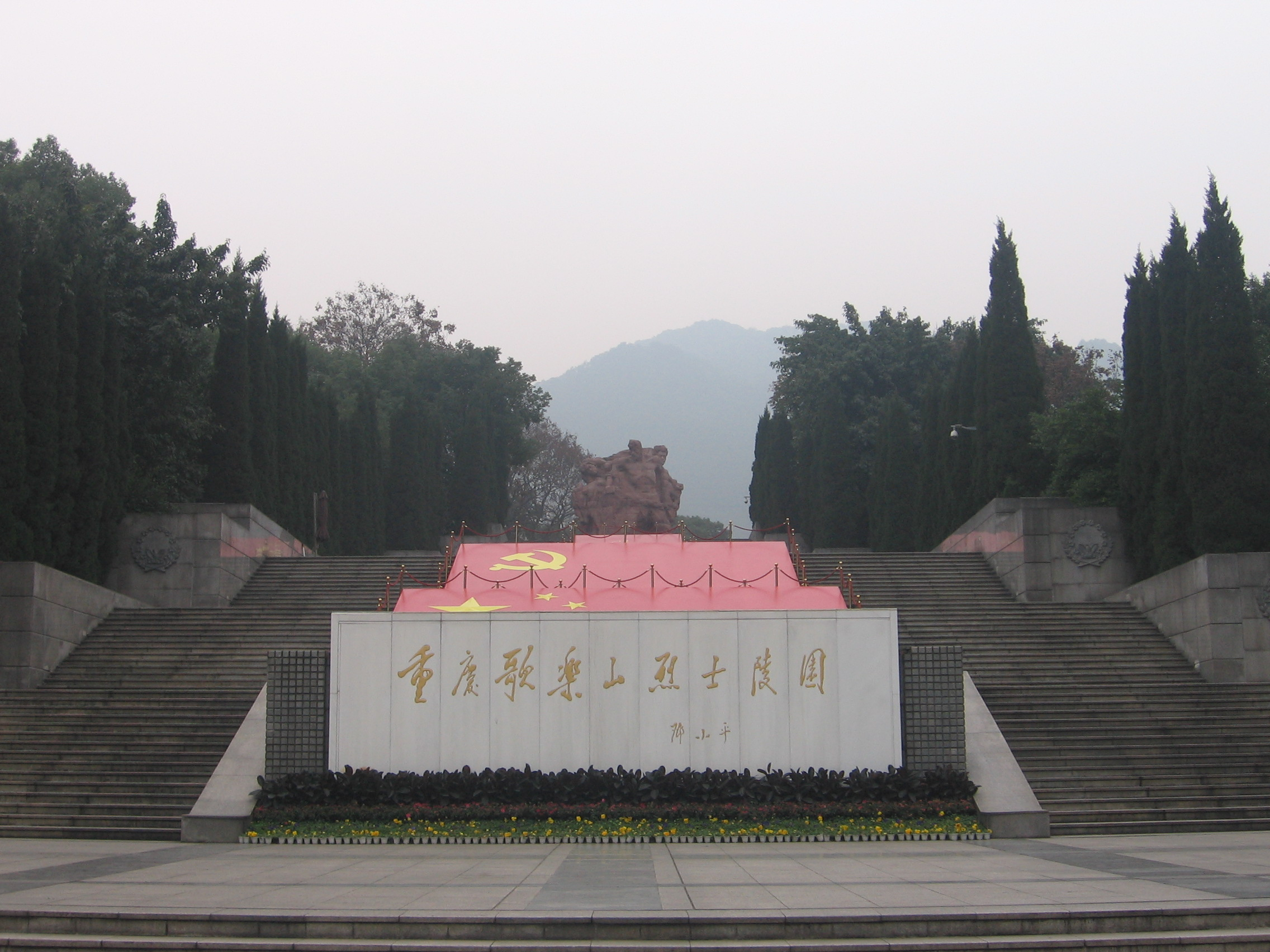
Geleshan Martyr's Mausoleum

Geleshan Park includes a cable car ride, a cultural exhibition hall ("Martyr’s Mausoleum"), a canopy walkway, a fishing club, rock climbing, forest obstacle courses, and forest cross country karting. Other attractions include Chinese chess themed structures, and a "fairyland" exhibit where visitors can watch and listen to famous fairytales.

Various festivals and events are also held at the Geleshan Forest Park, such as blueberry picking festivals, seasonal flower festivals, cycling races, and photography competitions.

Geleshan Park has been awarded a 4A rating by the China National Tourism Administration.

== See also ==
- List of protected areas of China
- Geleshan, administrative town
- Geleshan (disambiguation)
