= Gallery road =

Road through remote mountain areas of China

- 栈道
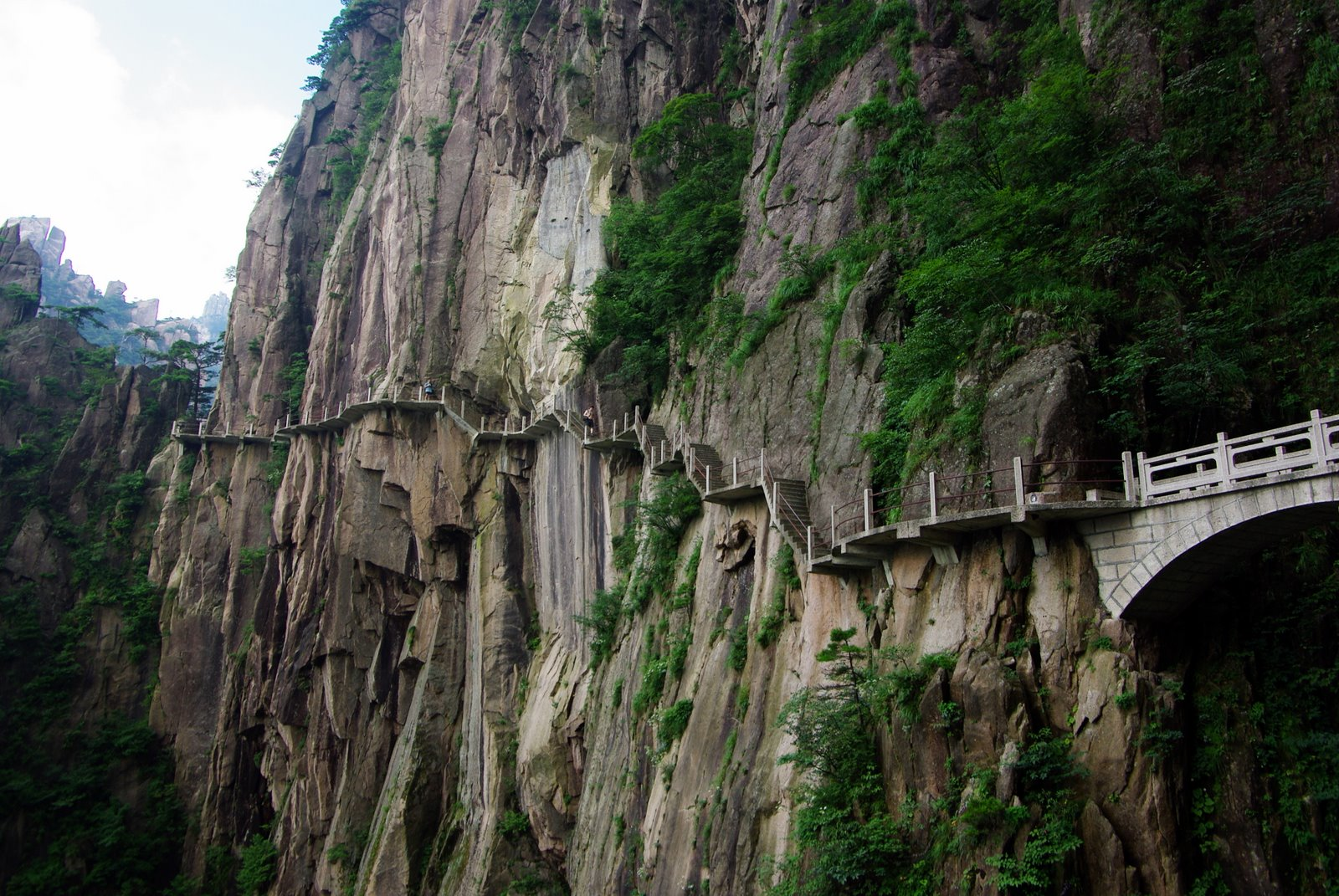
- A type of ancient trackway in China
- Location: China

The historical gallery roads (simplified Chinese: 栈道; traditional Chinese: 棧道), also known as cliff roads or plank roads, were routes traversing remote mountainous regions of China. The roads were fashioned using wooden planks securely fastened within holes carved into cliff sides. Primarily found in the Qin Mountains, they connected the Wei River and the Han River valleys. The first gallery roads were built during the Warring States period (476–221 BC) and used by Qin to invade Shu and Ba. They were fully consolidated into a thriving network during the Han dynasty. Before the 20th century, very primitive versions were used in the western gorges of the Pamir Mountains.

== Overview ==
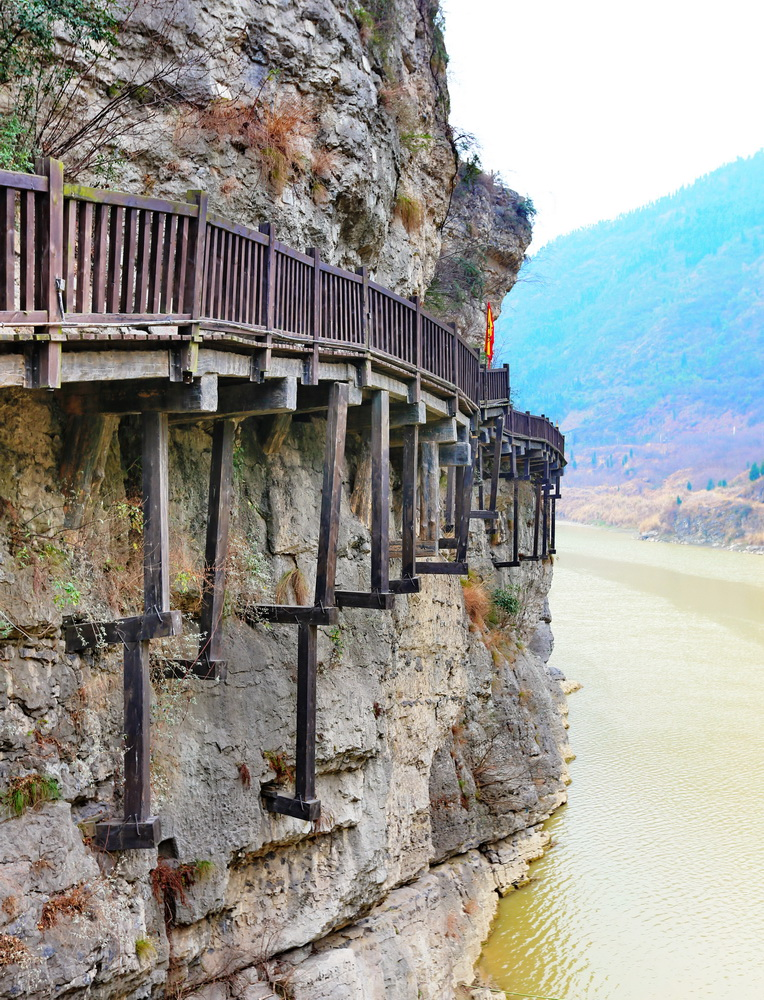
Gallery road of Mingyue Gorge, Sichuan, part of the Shudao system

Gallery roads were predominantly constructed to ease transportive strain across cliffs in rugged mountainous areas. One example is the Shu Road, which runs through some of China's most rugged and desolate terrains such as the Qinling and Daba Mountain ranges, to link the Wei River valley and the ancient capital of Chang'an, It used the plank road technique to secure pathways across cliffs and steep ravines.

The construction of gallery roads was tailored to the specific topographical features of the surrounding terrain, resulting in unique structural implementations. The most prevalent type of gallery road is a wooden plank road anchored to cliffs using holes and wooden piles, subsequently covered with wooden boards. An alternative method involved carving stone roads directly into cliff faces.

Modern reconstructions of gallery roads use more durable materials like steel and stone. Some sections have glass components intended to attract tourists.

== Historical gallery roads ==
=== Shudao ===
Shudao is the general name of the historic road that was constructed through the Qinling, Micang and Daba mountainous barrier. The main function of the Shudao is to connect the Wei River valley (today's Guanzhong) with the ancient capital Chang’An (today's Xi’An) in the north with Shu region (headquartered in today's Chengdu) in the south. The Shu Roads pass through some of the most rugged and desolate terrains in China. The first major highways were most likely built in the Warring States period (481–221 BCE). During the Qin (221–206 BCE) and Han (206 BCE – 220 CE) dynasties, this road network was massively improved upon. For the most part, the roads were built through natural corridors which had already been established as travel routes by their inhabitants. To build these important paths along the steep and dangerous cliff, the builders used the innovative road-building technique known as "Gallery Road" to fix the roads on the rock walls and cross the mountains, rivers and valleys.

== See also ==
- Historic roads and trails
- Stone Cattle Road
- Covered bridge
- Archaeology in China
- Shudao
- Twärrenbrücke
