= Geleshan =

Geleshan 歌乐山
- Subdistrict
- Geleshan Subdistrict 歌乐山街道
- Location within Chongqing Location within China
- Coordinates: 29°34′40″N 106°24′45.29″E
- Country: China
- Municipality: Chongqing
- District: Shapingba District

Geleshan
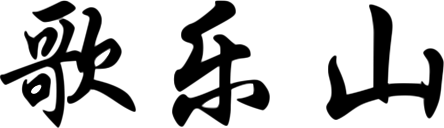
- "Geleshan" in Chinese characters
- Traditional Chinese: 歌樂山
- Simplified Chinese: 歌乐山
Transcriptions
Standard Mandarin
- Hanyu Pinyin: Gēlèshān

Geleshan (Chinese: 歌乐山; pinyin: Gēlèshān) is a subdistrict in the Shapingba District of Chongqing, China. It is located 13.6 kilometres (8.5 mi) west of Chongqing city centre.

== Demographics ==
As of 2010, Geleshan has a recorded population of 41,674. The population consists of 21,045 females and 20,629 males. Children under 15 comprise 8.0%, persons 15–64 years old comprise 83%, and 65 years old or over 8.0%.

== Culture ==
The famous spicy chicken dish Laziji (辣子鸡) is thought to originate from Geleshan.

== Education ==
The Chongqing Communications Institute (Chinese: 中国人民解放军重庆通信学院; pinyin: Zhōngguó rénmín jiěfàngjūn Chóngqìng tōngxìn xuéyuàn) is a college located in the Geleshan Subdistrict.

Other notable institutions in Geleshan include the Chongqing Business Career Academy, Chongqing Zhengda Software Vocational college, and the Technical Institute Tianchi Campus.

== Tourism ==
Geleshan is perhaps best known for its forest park, the Geleshan National Forest Park, which is a nationally protected area.

== Geography ==
The terrain around Geleshan is hilly to the southwest, with a flat northeastern area. The highest point of the area is 647 metres (2,123 ft) above sea level, situated in the southeastern area. The neighbourhoods around Geleshan consists mainly of farmland.

=== Climate ===
Much of Geleshan lies in the humid subtropical climate zone (Köppen climate classification Cfa), featuring warm humid summers and generally mild winters with cool spells. The average rainfall is 1,114 millimetres (43.9 in).

Climate data for Geleshan
Month	Jan	Feb	Mar	Apr	May	Jun	Jul	Aug	Sep	Oct	Nov	Dec	Year
Mean daily maximum °C (°F)	9.1 (48.4)	11.1 (52.0)	16.5 (61.7)	21.7 (71.1)	25.4 (77.7)	27.9 (82.2)	31.6 (88.9)	32.1 (89.8)	26.2 (79.2)	20.3 (68.5)	15.3 (59.5)	10.6 (51.1)	20.7 (69.2)
Mean daily minimum °C (°F)	4.5 (40.1)	5.9 (42.6)	9.7 (49.5)	13.9 (57.0)	17.8 (64.0)	20.6 (69.1)	23.4 (74.1)	23.6 (74.5)	19.5 (67.1)	14.9 (58.8)	10.7 (51.3)	6.4 (43.5)	14.2 (57.6)
Source: Climate-data.org

== See also ==
- Geleshan National Forest Park
- Shapingba District
- Chongqing
- List of township-level divisions of Chongqing
