= Laziji =

Chongqing dish of deep-fried chicken with dried chilies

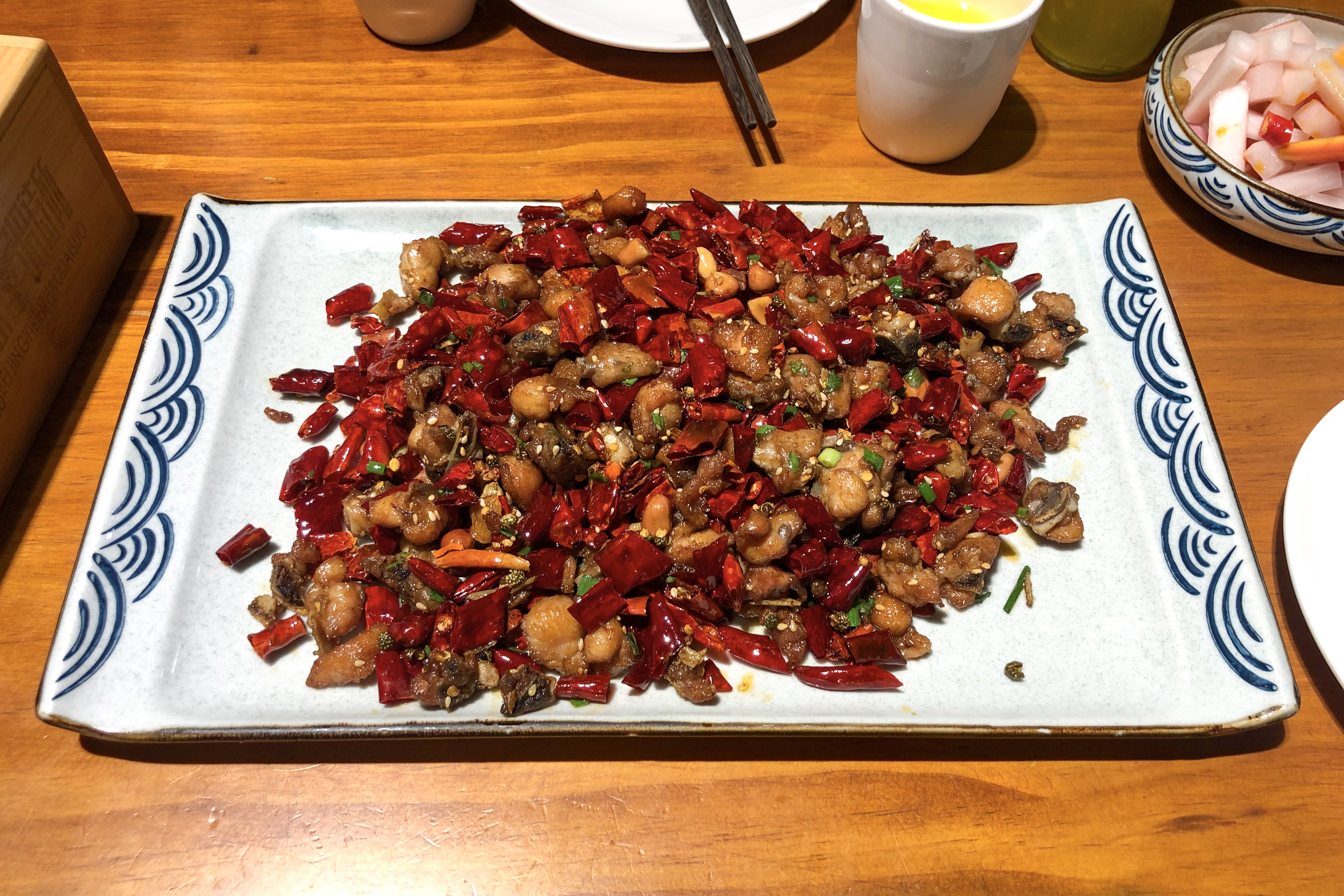
- A typical presentation of Chongqing-style Laziji, featuring chicken cubes "buried" under a mountain of dried chilies.
- Alternative names: Chongqing chicken, firecracker chicken, dry chili chicken, mala chicken
- Type: Stir-fry
- Course: Main
- Place of origin: China
- Region or state: Geleshan, Chongqing
- Associated cuisine: Sichuan cuisine
- Main ingredients: Chicken, dried chili pepper, Sichuan pepper, Ginger, Garlic

Laziji (simplified Chinese: 辣子鸡; traditional Chinese: 辣子雞; pinyin: làzijī; lit. 'chili pepper chicken') is one of the most iconic dishes of Sichuan cuisine. It consists of small pieces of marinated chicken that are deep-fried and then stir-fried with massive quantities of dried Sichuan pepper, dried red chilies, garlic, and ginger. Originating from the Geleshan region of Chongqing, it is a staple of Jianghu cuisine (a type of Chongqing folk cooking) and is renowned for its intense mala (numbing and spicy) flavor profile.

== History and origins ==
The dish is a relatively modern addition to the Sichuan canon, rising to prominence in the late 20th century. It originated in the town of Geleshan in Chongqing's Shapingba District. Local restaurateurs began using small, "mountain" (free-range) chickens, which were chopped into tiny, bone-in pieces to maximize the surface area for flavor absorption.

Historically, the dish gained popularity among truck drivers and travelers passing through Geleshan, eventually becoming a signature culinary export for the region. In its original form, the extreme volume of chilies served a dual purpose: providing flavor and acting as a preservative in the region's humid climate. Today, the presentation is primarily a stylistic choice, emphasizing the "treasure hunt" aspect of the meal.

== Preparation and technique ==
The preparation of laziji is a technical process focused on achieving the "dry-crisp" (gan cui) texture that defines the dish.

=== Marination and double-frying ===
The chicken is first chopped into small cubes (roughly 1–2 cm) and marinated in a mixture of Shaoxing wine, soy sauce, and salt. To achieve the correct texture, the chicken is typically double-fried in a wok. The first fry at a medium temperature cooks the meat through, while the second "flash fry" at a higher temperature creates a crispy, golden-brown exterior while keeping the inside tender.

=== The "mala" infusion ===
After frying, the oil is drained, leaving only a small amount for the aromatics. Sliced ginger, garlic, and doubanjiang (spicy fermented bean paste) are bloomed in the oil. The final and most critical step involves tossing the fried chicken with a vast quantity of dried red chilies and Sichuan peppercorns. The heat must be carefully managed to toast the peppers until they are fragrant and dark red without burning them, allowing their essential oils to coat every piece of chicken.

== Cultural significance and serving ==
Laziji is traditionally served as a communal dish. A hallmark of the authentic Chongqing style is that the chicken pieces are hidden beneath a "mountain" of peppers; diners must use chopsticks to "hunt" for the chicken among the spices. While the chilies are generally not eaten whole, their presence provides the aromatic foundation and visual drama that defines the dish. In modern restaurants, it is frequently garnished with toasted sesame seeds and sliced spring onions for added aroma and visual contrast.

== Variations ==
While the Chongqing Geleshan style is the most famous, variations exist across China:

- Guizhou style: Often uses "Cili" (crushed chili paste) rather than whole dried chilies, resulting in a "wetter" sauce.
- Home-style: May include vegetables like leeks or celery to balance the heat.

== Gallery ==
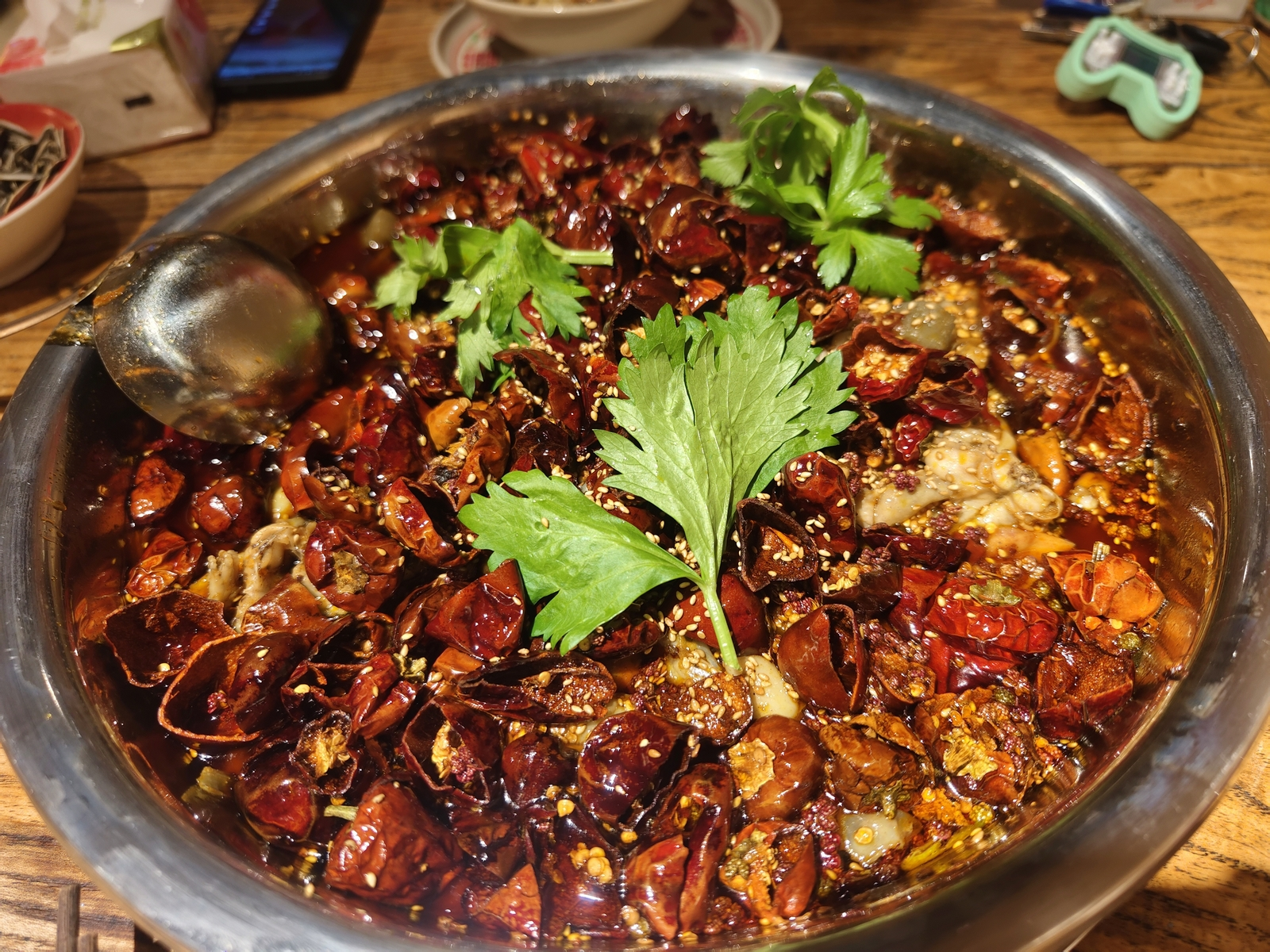

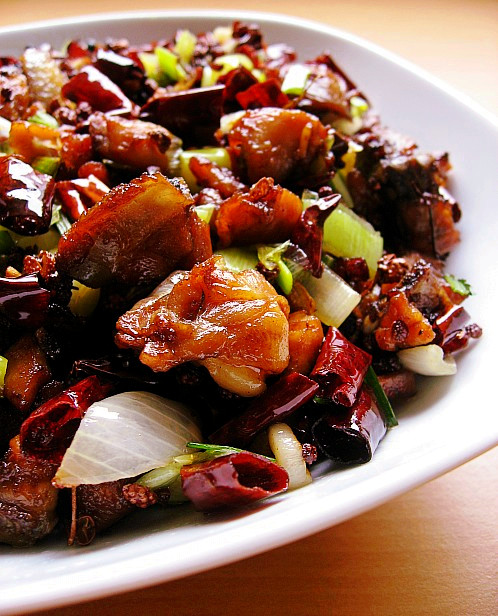

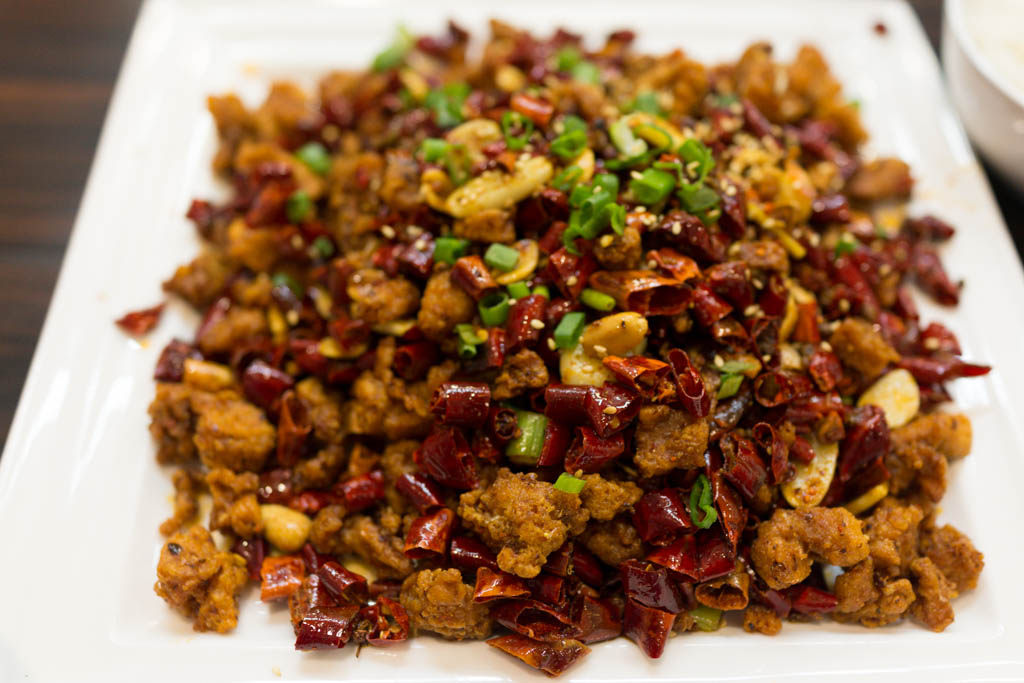

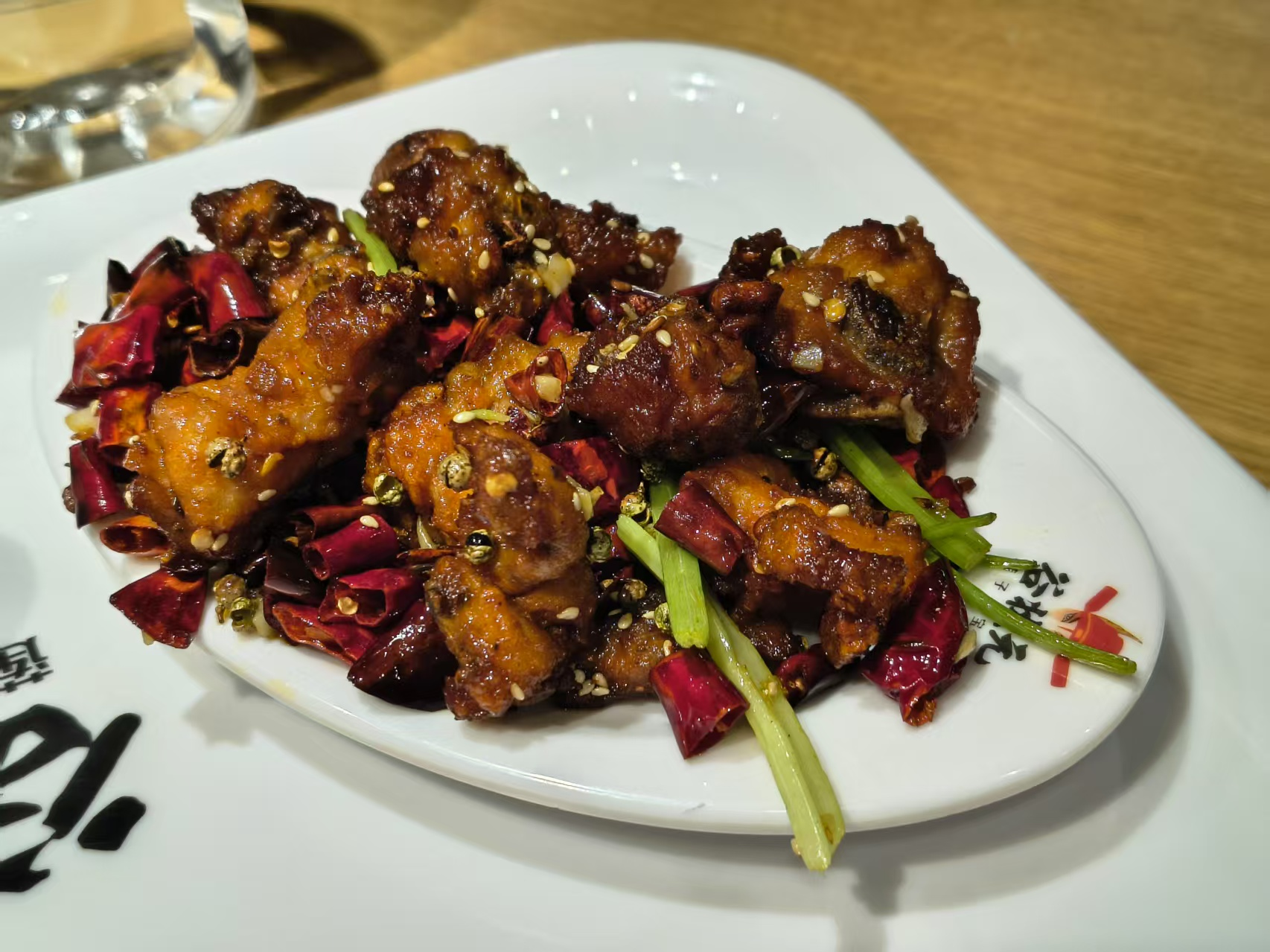

== See also ==
- Kung Pao chicken
- List of chicken dishes
- Sichuan cuisine
