= Yangtze Plain =

Series of alluvial plains along the Yangtze river

The Yangtze Plain (Chinese: 長江中下游平原/长江中下游平原; Wade-Giles: Ch'ang Chiang P'ing-yüan; Pinyin: Chang Jiang Pingyuan) is made up of a series of alluvial plains along the Yangtze River and its major tributaries.

The Yangtze Plain starts east of Yichang (Hubei province), China. The Middle Yangtze Plain is made up of parts of the north-eastern and south-eastern Hunan, Hubei, and north-central Jiangxi provinces, and includes the Dongting, Poyang, and Hong lakes.

The Middle-Lower Yangtze Plain stretches eastward from Mount Wu to the coast. It is made up of alluvial deposits from the Yangtze River and its tributaries. The plain is somewhat swampy, made up of many lakes and rivers, making it suitable for rice growing and freshwater fish, and it is therefore known as the "land of fish and rice". The area also produces tea, silk, rapeseed, broad beans, and tangerines.

The Lower Yangtze Plain includes the Yangtze River Delta.

== Geology, hydrology, and culture ==
During the most recent geological stage, the middle and lower Yangtze Plain was a region of crustal subsidence, which once formed a vast depression and lakes far larger in scale than those of today, such as the Yunmeng Marsh.

The present-day middle and lower Yangtze Plain includes the provinces and municipalities of Hubei, Hunan, Jiangxi, Anhui, Jiangsu, Zhejiang, and Shanghai, and is divided by surrounding low hills (Jiangnan Hills) into the following four parts:

- Two-Lakes Plain: Divided by the Yangtze River into northern and southern sections, comprising the Dongting Lake Plain in Hunan (area about 19,000 square kilometers) and the Jianghan Plain in Hubei (area over 30,000 square kilometers);
- Poyang Lake Plain: Located in Jiangxi, with an area of about 20,000 square kilometers;
- Jianghuai Plain: Located in the area south of the Huai River and north of the Yangtze River in Anhui and Jiangsu provinces, facing the Yangtze River Delta across the river, covering about 70,000 square kilometers;
- Yangtze River Delta: Located east of Zhenjiang in Jiangsu, north of the Qiantang River and Hangzhou Bay, and south of the Tongyang Canal, with an area of about 50,000 square kilometers. Elevations are mostly below 10 meters. According to incomplete statistics, the total area of lakes and depressions here reaches over 20,000 square kilometers, accounting for about 10% of the middle and lower Yangtze Plain. The terrain is low and flat, with a dense network of rivers and numerous lakes. It is the region with the most lakes in China, with more than 1,300 relatively large lakes. Known as the "Land of Water and Lakes," it is one of the most densely populated areas in mainland China.

== Covered Areas ==
Provincial-level administrative region	Region	Cities
Hubei Province	Central and southern parts	Jingmen, Jingzhou, Wuhan, Huanggang, Ezhou, Huangshi, Xianning, etc.
Hunan Province	Central and northern parts	Changde, Yiyang, Changsha, Yueyang, etc.
Jiangxi Province	Northern part	Jiujiang, Nanchang, Fuzhou, Jingdezhen, etc.
Anhui Province	Along the Yangtze River	Anqing, Chizhou, Tongling, Hefei, Wuhu, Ma'anshan, etc.
Jiangsu Province	Central and southern parts	Nanjing, Zhenjiang, Yangzhou, Taizhou, Changzhou, Wuxi, Suzhou, Nantong, etc.
Shanghai	Most areas	
Zhejiang Province	Northeastern part	Zhoushan, Shaoxing, Hangzhou, Ningbo, Jiaxing, Huzhou, etc.

== Climate ==
The region has a subtropical monsoon climate and has long been prone to droughts and floods. It has four distinct seasons, with a mild and humid climate and concurrent rainfall and heat. The average annual temperature generally ranges between 15 and 18°C, gradually increasing from north to south. Annual precipitation is about 1,000 to 1,600 millimeters, with the main rainy season from April to September accounting for more than 70% of the yearly total. Influenced by the East Asian monsoon, summer is dominated by southeasterly monsoons from the ocean, bringing abundant rainfall, while winter is controlled by northwesterly monsoons, with relatively cold and dry conditions. The Meiyu phenomenon is significant, with continuous overcast and rainy weather from June to July, often forming the Meiyu season, which has a considerable impact on agricultural production. Autumn is cool, winters are damp and cold, and low-temperature rain and snow occasionally occur.

== Soil ==
The zonal soils of the middle and lower Yangtze Plain are mainly red soil, yellow soil, and paddy soil, making it one of China's most important rice and rapeseed production areas. Influenced by topography, climate, and hydrological conditions, soil types show clear regional differences. Red and yellow soils, with relatively thick texture and strong acidity, are mainly distributed in the hilly transition zones in the western and southern parts of the plain. Alluvial paddy soil is widely distributed in the central and eastern low-lying areas; it is a typical paddy-field soil with good water and nutrient retention. Newly formed alluvial soils with high fertility are common in river floodplains, while swamp soils and fluvo-aquic soils develop around lakes and depressions. In some low-lying areas, poor drainage or high groundwater mineralization leads to salinization, forming lakeside saline soils or gleyed paddy soils.

== See also ==
- Jiangnan
