= 965 =

Calendar year

965 in various calendars
- Gregorian calendar: 965; CMLXV
- Ab urbe condita: 1718
- Armenian calendar: 414; ԹՎ ՆԺԴ
- Assyrian calendar: 5715
- Balinese saka calendar: 886–887
- Bengali calendar: 371–372
- Berber calendar: 1915
- Buddhist calendar: 1509
- Burmese calendar: 327
- Byzantine calendar: 6473–6474
- Chinese calendar: 甲子年 (Wood Rat); 3662 or 3455 — to — 乙丑年 (Wood Ox); 3663 or 3456
- Coptic calendar: 681–682
- Discordian calendar: 2131
- Ethiopian calendar: 957–958
- Hebrew calendar: 4725–4726
- Hindu calendars
- Vikram Samvat: 1021–1022
- Shaka Samvat: 886–887
- Kali Yuga: 4065–4066
- Holocene calendar: 10965
- Iranian calendar: 343–344
- Islamic calendar: 353–355
- Japanese calendar: Kōhō 2 (康保２年)
- Javanese calendar: 865–866
- Julian calendar: 965; CMLXV
- Korean calendar: 3298
- Minguo calendar: 947 before ROC 民前947年
- Nanakshahi calendar: −503
- Seleucid era: 1276/1277 AG
- Thai solar calendar: 1507–1508
- Tibetan calendar: ཤིང་ཕོ་བྱི་བ་ལོ་ (male Wood-Rat); 1091 or 710 or −62 — to — ཤིང་མོ་གླང་ལོ་ (female Wood-Ox); 1092 or 711 or −61

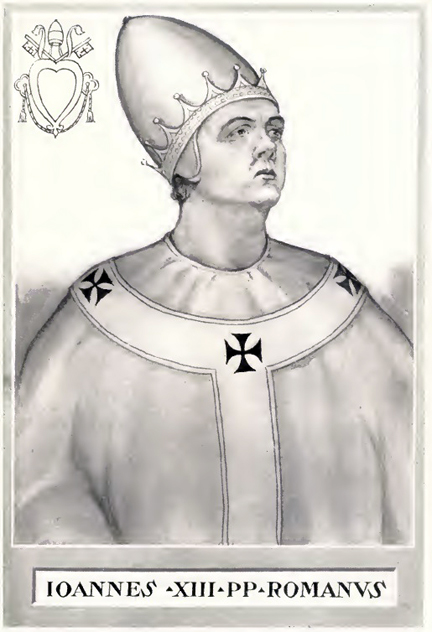
Pope John XIII (r. 965–972)

Year 965 (CMLXV) was a common year starting on Sunday of the Julian calendar.

== Events ==
=== By place ===
==== Byzantine Empire ====
- Arab–Byzantine War: Emperor Nikephoros II conquers the fortress cities of Tarsus and Mopsuestia. The Muslim residents abandon the defense and flee into Syria. Nikephoros completes the conquest of Cilicia; Muslim raids into Anatolia (modern Turkey) permanently cease. Byzantine troops under General Niketas Chalkoutzes occupy Cyprus, liberating the Greek population from Muslim domination.
- Battle of the Straits: The Byzantine attempt to recover Sicily fails, when the Byzantine fleet is annihilated by the Fatimids. The last Byzantine stronghold on the island, Rometta, surrenders. The population is massacred, and the survivors are sold into slavery. Caliph Al-Mu'izz li-Din Allah completes the conquest of Sicily, and establishes naval superiority in the Western Mediterranean.

==== Europe ====
- Spring – King Lothair III exploits the succession crisis in Flanders and captures many cities, but is eventually repulsed by the supporters of Arnulf II – the son of Baldwin III and former co-ruler of Flanders. Lothair attempts to increase his influence in Lotharingia, once held by the Carolingian dynasty. Emperor Otto I (the Great) encourages resistance to Lothair's overtures.
- Boleslaus I (the Cruel), duke of Bohemia, expands his territory into the Polish territories of Upper Silesia and Lesser Poland. By occupying the city of Kraków, he controls important trade routes from Prague to Kiev and Lviv. Prince Mieszko I of Poland makes an alliance with Boleslaus and marries his daughter Dobrawa.
- The Khazar fortress city of Sarkel, located on the Lower Don River, is captured by Kievan Rus' under Grand Prince Sviatoslav I. The city is renamed Belaya Vezha (White Fortress) and settled by Slavs.
- The last of the Jelling stones was erected in Denmark by the king Harald Bluetooth; a monumental incident in danish history, often referred to as the birth of Denmark as a nation unified under the religion of Christianity.

==== Asia ====
- July 12 – In China, Emperor Meng Chang of Later Shu dies after a 30-year reign. His kingdom is invaded and incorporated into the expanding Song dynasty.
- In Tĩnh Hải quân under the Ngô dynasty, rebellions broke out in two villages Đường and Nguyễn (now located in present-day Thái Bình). King Ngô Xương Văn, in an attempt to quell that rebellions, is killed by the rebels which led to the Anarchy of the 12 Warlords started in the same year.

=== By topic ===
==== Literature ====
- September 23 – Al-Mutanabbi, an Abbasid poet, returns from 5 years in Mesopotamia. He has lived at Shiraz under the protection of the Buyid emir 'Adud al-Dawla, but bandits kill him near An Numaniyah (modern Iran).

==== Religion ====
- March 1 – Pope Leo VIII dies after a 13-month reign. He is succeeded by John XIII as the 133rd pope of the Catholic Church.

== Births ==
- Dudo of Saint-Quentin, Norman historian (approximate date)
- Frederick of Luxembourg, count of Moselgau (d. 1019)
- Gerberga of Burgundy, duchess consort of Swabia (or 966)
- Godfrey II, count and duke of Lower Lorraine (d. 1023)
- Hárek of Tjøtta, Norwegian chieftain (approximate date)
- Hugh I, count of Empúries and Peralada (approximate date)
- Ibn al-Haytham, Arab astronomer and physicist (d. 1040)
- Leo of Vercelli, German bishop (approximate date)
- Sharif al-Murtaza, Buyid Shia scholar (d. 1044)
- Theodoric I, duke of Upper Lorraine (approximate date)

== Deaths ==
- February 22 – Otto, duke of Burgundy (b. 944)
- March 1 – Leo VIII, pope of the Catholic Church
- March 28 – Arnulf I, count of Flanders
- May 20 – Gero (the Great), Frankish nobleman
- June 25 – Guy, margrave of Ivrea (b. 940)
- July 4 – Benedict V, pope of the Catholic Church
- July 12 – Meng Chang, emperor of Later Shu (b. 919)
- September 23 – Al-Mutanabbi, Abbasid poet (b. 915)
- October 11 – Bruno I, archbishop of Cologne (b. 925)
- Al-Husayn ibn Ali al-Maghribi, Abbasid statesman
- Guo Chong, Chinese general (approximate date)
- Hedwig of Saxony, Frankish duchess and regent
- Li, empress dowager of Later Shu (Ten Kingdoms)
- Li Hao, Chinese chancellor (approximate date)
- Moses ben Hanoch, Jewish rabbi (approximate date)
- Joseph Bringas, Byzantine eunuch and official
- Wu Cheng, Chinese chancellor (b. 893)
- Zhong, empress consort of Southern Tang
- Ngô Xương Văn, king of Tĩnh Hải quân under Ngô dynasty
