= Wang Zhaoyuan =

Wang Zhaoyuan is the name of:

- Wang Zhaoyuan (general) (died 975), Later Shu politician and general
- Wang Zhaoyuan (scholar) (1763–1851), Qing dynasty Confucian scholar
