= Wu Zhaoyi =

Wu Zhaoyi (毋昭裔) or Guan Zhaoyi (毌昭裔) was an official of the Chinese Five Dynasties and Ten Kingdoms period state Later Shu, serving as a chancellor during the reign of its second emperor Meng Chang.

== Background ==
Not much is known about Wu Zhaoyi's personal background, including when he was born, but it is known that he was from Longmen (龍門, in modern Yuncheng, Shanxi). It was said that he was renowned in his knowledge and talent. When the Later Tang general Meng Zhixiang was commissioned by Later Tang's first emperor Li Cunxu as the military governor (Jiedushi) of Xichuan Circuit (西川, headquartered in modern Chengdu, Sichuan) in late 925 in light of Later Tang's recent conquest of its southwestern neighbor Former Shu (which had ruled the territory), Meng invited Wu to serve as his secretary. After Li Cunxu was killed in a mutiny in 926 and succeeded by his adoptive brother Li Siyuan, Li Siyuan tried to assert more control over Meng by sending the official Li Yan (李嚴) to serve as the monitor of the Xichuan army later in the year, Wu suggested Meng to deny Li Yan entry, but Meng did not agree. He ultimately allowed Li Yan to come to Xichuan's capital Chengdu, and then found an excuse to kill Li Yan. Despite his not having agreed with Wu, however, Meng saw Wu's point and believed him to be talented, and therefore wanted to find greater responsibilities for him.

== As Later Shu official ==
After Meng Zhixiang declared himself the emperor of a new independent state of Later Shu in 934, he commissioned Wu Zhaoyi as the deputy chief imperial censor (御史中丞, Yushi Zhongcheng).

Meng died later in 934, and was succeeded by his son Meng Chang. In 935, Wu was given the titles of Zhongshu Shilang (中書侍郎, deputy head of the legislative bureau of government (中書省, Zhongshu Sheng)) and Tong Zhongshu Menxia Pingzhangshi (同中書門下平章事), making him a chancellor. He was later made Menxia Shilang (門下侍郎, the deputy head of the examination bureau (門下省, Menxia Sheng)). In 940, when fellow chancellor Zhao Jiliang, who had been overseeing the three financial agencies (taxation, treasury, and salt and iron monopolies), asked to have that responsibility divided between him, Wu, and fellow chancellor Zhang Ye, Meng Chang put Wu in charge of salt and iron monopolies and Zhang in charge of treasury, leaving Zhao in charge of taxation.

In 948, two generals of Later Han (which was ruling the former Later Tang territory by this point), Wang Jingchong the military governor of Fengxiang Circuit (鳳翔, headquartered in modern Baoji, Shaanxi), and Zhao Siwan, who then controlled Yongxing Circuit (永興, headquartered in modern Xi'an, Shaanxi), rebelled against Later Han and entered an alliance with another rebel general, Li Shouzhen. However, they also sent emissaries to Later Shu, offering to submit to Meng Chang. Meng sent An Siqian (安思謙) the military governor of Shannan West Circuit (山南西道, headquartered in modern Hanzhong, Shaanxi) to aid them. Wu submitted a petition urging against it, pointing out the examples of Li Cunxu and Former Shu's last emperor Wang Zongyan as those who overly exerted their armies. Meng did not listen to him. Ultimately, the campaign was not successful, and Later Shu was unable to add those circuits to its possessions.

Several years later, Wu retired with the honorific title Taizi Taishi (太子太師). It was said that Wu was an ardent book collector and favored the study of old Confucian classic texts. He had the official Zhang Dezhao (張德釗) copy the classics and carve them on stone tablets to be displayed at Chengdu, in the example of the Tang dynasty's display of such classics at its capital Chang'an. Further, it was said that the Shu region had lacked schools ever since Tang fell. Wu expended his private wealth to build schools and dormitories, and also persuaded Meng to have the Four Books and Five Classics reprinted. He also had his followers Gou Wenzheng (句文正) and Sun Jiangji (孫絳吉) reprint a number of poetic texts that he considered worthy of publication (including the Wen Xuan, the Chuxueji (初學記), and the Baishi Liutie (白氏六帖)). Wu himself authored three volumes of commentaries on the sounds of the characters used in the Erya.

It is not known when Wu died, although presumably it was before the fall of Later Shu in 965. After Later Shu's fall, Wu's son Wu Shousu (毋守素) became an official of the Song dynasty (which had conquered Later Shu), and the books that Wu had published were spread throughout the land by Wu Shousu's efforts.

== Notes and references ==
- Spring and Autumn Annals of the Ten Kingdoms, vol. 52.
- Zizhi Tongjian, vols. 279, 282, 288.
