= Meng Xuanzhe =

Meng Xuanzhe (孟玄喆) (937–991), courtesy name Zunsheng (遵聖), formally the Duke of Teng (滕國公), was a crown prince of the Chinese Five Dynasties and Ten Kingdoms period Later Shu state under his father Meng Chang, the last emperor of the state. After Later Shu was destroyed by the Song dynasty, Meng Xuanzhe served as a general and official for Song.

== During Later Shu ==
Meng Xuanzhe was born in 937, during the early reign of his father Meng Chang, as Meng Chang's oldest son. His mother's identity was lost to history. He was said to be intelligent in his youth and capable in calligraphy. In 950, when Meng Chang created his brothers and sons imperial princes, Meng Xuanzhe was created the Prince of Qin; he was also given the titles of acting Taiwei (太尉), commander of the imperial guards, and honorary chancellor (Tong Zhongshu Menxia Pingzhangshi, 同中書門下平章事). There was a time that he wrote out, in calligraphy, the instructions that the famous Tang dynasty chancellor Yao Chong left his sons, and then had the calligraphy carved onto rocks. Meng Chang, for this work, awarded him silver vessels and colored silk.

In 958, Meng Chang gave Meng Xuanzhe the title of military governor (Jiedushi) of Wude Circuit (武德, headquartered in Mianyang, Sichuan). In 961, he was given the greater honorary chancellor title of Shizhong (侍中). In 962, Meng Chang created him Crown Prince. For reasons unclear to history, Meng Chang also ordered that his attendants and people who announced his arrival should refer him as "His Imperial Highness" rather than "the Crown Prince." The chancellor Li Hao, believing this to be irregular, argued against the order, and the order was rescinded.

In spring 964, in the middle of the invasion by Later Shu's northeastern neighbor Song dynasty, the commanding general of the Later Shu troops Wang Zhaoyuan was suffering multiple defeats at the hands of the Song army. Meng Chang became fearful, and commissioned another army to head to defend Jianmen Pass and put Meng Xuanzhe in titular command of it, with the generals Li Tinggui (李廷珪) and Zhang Hui'an (張惠安) in actual command. Meng Xuanzhe's banners were all adorned with silk, but when the army encountered rain, he had the silk removed and then replaced when the rain stopped — but doing so caused the silk to be hung upside down. He also took his concubines and entertainers with him, such that he became a laughing stock for doing so. Before he could reach Jianmen, however, news came that Wang and Wang's deputy Zhao Chongtao (趙崇韜) had been again defeated and captured by Song forces. He panicked and, after initially intending to take up defensive position at Wude's capital Zi Prefecture (梓州), instead fled back to the Later Shu capital Chengdu. This caused major panic at the capital, leading to his father Meng Chang's decision to surrender to Song shortly after, ending Later Shu.

== During Song ==
Later in 965, Meng Chang and his family, as well as a group of high level Later Shu officials, were taken from Chengdu to the Song capital Kaifeng, where they formally submitted themselves to the mercies of Song's Emperor Taizu. Emperor Taizu pardoned them, and created Meng Chang the Duke of Qin. Meanwhile, Meng Xuanzhe was commissioned to be acting Taiwei and military governor of Taining Circuit (泰寧, headquartered in modern Jining, Shandong). When Meng Chang died several days shortly after, the Song emperor, in mourning Meng Chang, gave Meng Xuanzhe bestowments of 500 goats and 500 urns of wine. Meng Xuanzhe, in turn, offered as tributes to the emperor 200 horses and saddle decorations made of jade and crystal.

Meng Xuanzhe was later moved to be the military governor of Yongqing Circuit (永清, headquartered in modern Xingtai, Hebei). He spent more than a decade there and was said to govern it capably. (However, he was also said to be overly strict in his tax regulations, causing great burdens on the people of Yongqing's capital Bei Prefecture (貝州). His regulations, however, were not abolished until long after his death, during the Jingde era (1004-1007) of Emperor Taizu's nephew Emperor Zhenzong.) Early in the Taiping Xingguo era (976-984) of Emperor Taizu's brother and successor Emperor Taizong, Meng was moved to Dingwu Circuit (定武, headquartered in modern Baoding, Hebei). In 978, he was given the honorary title of Kaifu YItong Sansi (開府儀同三司). In 977, when Emperor Taizong launched a major attack on Song's northern neighbor Northern Han — the only remaining rival to Song in what was then considered Chinese territory — which eventually led to Song's destruction of Northern Han, Meng accompanied him on the campaign.

After destroying Northern Han, Emperor Taizong wanted to further attack northeast to capture the Sixteen Prefectures region, which Later Jin's founder Shi Jingtang had ceded to the Khitan Liao dynasty in appreciation of Liao's support of his overthrow of Later Tang. In preparation for the campaign, he had Meng take up position at Zhen Prefecture (鎮州, in modern Shijiazhuang, Hebei) to prepare for his next move. He then headed to the largest city in the Sixteen Prefectures region, You Prefecture (幽州, in modern Beijing), and put it under siege. Meng was one of the generals participating in the siege. However, a Liao relief army, commanded by the Liao chancellor Yelü Sha, arrived during the siege and defeated the Song army, forcing the Song army to flee. In the aftermaths of the defeat at You, Emperor Taizong, who suffered a severe leg wound that would eventually lead to his death in 997, was anticipating further Liao incursions, and he ordered Meng to take up defensive position at Dingwu's capital Ding Prefecture (定州) and sent a number of imperial generals to Ding as well to assist him. When a Liao incursion did occur, Meng and the other imperial generals repelled them at Xu River (徐河), leading to their retreat. For this achievement, Meng was created the Duke of Teng. He was then recalled to the imperial government to serve as a general of the imperial guards. Shortly after, he was again sent out of the capital to serve as the prefect of Hua Prefecture (滑州, in modern Anyang, Henan).

Early in Emperor Taizong's Chunhua era (990-994), Meng became ill, and requested to be moved to a less important prefecture on the Huai River. Accordingly, he was moved to Chu Prefecture (滁州, in modern Chuzhou, Anhui). He died while serving there, in 991, and was given posthumous honors.

== Notes and references ==
- History of Song, vol. 479.
- Spring and Autumn Annals of the Ten Kingdoms, vol. 50.
- Zizhi Tongjian, vol. 289.
- Xu Zizhi Tongjian, vols. 2, 4, 10.
