= Wu Guo Gushi =

- Language: Classical Chinese
- Subject: history of the Five Dynasties period
- Publication place: Song dynasty

Wu Guo Gushi
- Traditional Chinese: 五國故事
- Simplified Chinese: 五国故事
Transcriptions
Standard Mandarin
- Hanyu Pinyin: Wǔ Guó Gùshì
- Wade–Giles: Wu Kuo ku-shih

Wu Guo Gushi ("Stories of the Five States") is a 10th-century Song dynasty history book, which in 2 chapters describes 5 of the southern states during the chaotic Five Dynasties period (907–960): the Wu, Southern Tang, Later Shu (including information on Former Shu), Southern Han and Min Kingdom, especially their rulers. The author is unknown, but the book is considered unofficial (unlike the imperial court-sanctioned Old History of the Five Dynasties, with which it disagrees at some points). Emphasized in the book are court life, supernatural events and anecdotes.

Despite its unofficial status, the book uses the word "illegitimate" (偽) to describe all 5 states, which fit Song dynasty's official rhetoric that considered only the 5 northern dynasties (Later Liang, Later Tang, Later Jin, Later Han, and Later Zhou) legitimate during this period.
