= Interpretation of dreams =

Interpretation of dreams may refer to:

- Dream interpretation, the process of assigning meaning to dreams
- Oneiromancy, a form of divination based upon dreams
- Interpretation of Dreams (Antiphon), a classical work by Antiphon, surviving only in fragments
- Oneirocritica (Greek for "The Interpretation of Dreams"), a classical work by Artemidorus
- The Interpretation of Dreams, Sigmund Freud's 1899 book about psychoanalysis and dreams
- Interpretation of Dreams (film), 1990 documentary film released by Andrei Zagdansky

== See also ==
- Book of Dreams (disambiguation)
