= Book of Dreams (disambiguation) =

Book of Dreams is a 1977 album by Steve Miller Band.

Book of Dreams may also refer to:

== Literature ==
- Book of Dreams (novel), a 1961 novel by Jack Kerouac
- The Book of Dreams (Vance novel), the final novel (1981) in The Demon Princes series by Jack Vance
- Yume No Hon: The Book of Dreams, a 2005 novel by Catherynne M. Valente
- My Education: A Book of Dreams, a collection of essays by William S. Burroughs
- Book of Dreams, chapters 83-90 of the Coptic version of the Book of Enoch, circa 160CE
- The Book of Dreams of Ibn Abi al-Dunya
- Book of Dreams, of Abd al-Ghani al-Nabulsi
- Book of Dreams, by Wang Zhaoyuan
- Book of Dreams, a novel by T. Davis Bunn 2012
- A Book of Dreams, a 1973 memoir by Peter Reich, son of Wilhelm Reich
- The Book of Dreams, a historical fiction novel by Tim Severin
- The Book of Dreams (Melling novel), a 2003 young adult fantasy novel by O. R. Melling
- The Sandman: Book of Dreams, by Neil Gaiman
- Book of Dreams, a book based on illustrations and notes by Federico Fellini

== Music ==
- Book of Dreams, a 1995 compilation in the Tangerine Dream discography
- Book of Dreams, an EP featuring Melba Moore
- "Book of Dreams", a 1992 song by Bruce Springsteen from Lucky Town
- "Book of Dreams", a 1990 song by Suzanne Vega, from Days of Open Hand

== See also ==
- The Dream Book, a 1999 album by Joe McPhee
- Dream dictionary, a tool made for interpreting images in a dream
