= Madame Huarui =

Chinese concubine

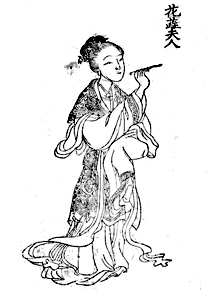
- An illustration from a Chinese book named as 《百美新詠圖傳》
- Chinese: 花蕊夫人
- Literal meaning: Lady Flower Bud
Transcriptions
Standard Mandarin
- Hanyu Pinyin: Huāruǐ Fūrén
Yue: Cantonese
- Jyutping: Faa^{1}-jeoi^{5} Fu^{1}-jan^{4}

Consort Xu (徐惠妃) (other histories give her family name as Fei) (c. 940 – 976) was a concubine of Later Shu's emperor Meng Chang during imperial China's Five Dynasties and Ten Kingdoms period. More commonly known as Madame Huarui (花蕊夫人) ("lady flower-stamen"), a name given to her because of her great beauty, she was also a notable poet.

She may have originally come from Qingcheng. When Emperor Taizu of Song defeated Meng Cheng, and had him executed, Madame Huarui was captured. Emperor Taizu had heard of her fame as a poet and asked her to compose a poem for him. Madame Huarui immediately sang (as translated by Anthony C. Yu):

君王城上竪降旗	The king on the rampart flies the white flag.
妾在深宮那得知	Deep within the palace how could I know?
十四萬人齊解甲	One hundred forty thousand all disarmed!
更無一個是男兒	Among these was there not a single man?

Emperor Taizu became enamoured, and to favour her, much to the displeasure of his heir Prince Jin (later to become the Emperor Taizong). Some stories claim that Huarui, who remained loyal to her empire and kept an image of Meng Cheng, tried to take revenge by attempting to assassinate Taizu, poisoning him several times.

Prince Jin tried to convince the emperor to have her put to death and, when that failed, he killed Huarui, deliberately shooting her with his arrow during a royal hunt, staging it as an accident.
