= Li Hao (Later Shu) =

Li Hao (李昊) (891?/893?‒965?), courtesy name Qiongzuo (穹佐), was an official for the Chinese Five Dynasties and Ten Kingdoms period states Former Shu, Later Tang, and Later Shu, serving as a chancellor during the reign of Later Shu's last emperor Meng Chang.

== Background ==
Li Hao was probably born in 893. He claimed to be descended from the Tang dynasty chancellor Li Shen. His grandfather Li Qianyou (李亁祐) served as a prefect of Jian Prefecture (建州, in modern Nanping, Fujian), and his father Li Gao (李羔) served as a secretary at the government of Rong District (容管, headquartered in modern Yulin, Guangxi). However, Li Hao was not born there; rather, he was said to be born in the Guanzhong region, near the Tang capital Chang'an.

Li Hao's childhood happened to be at a time of great disturbance for Tang — which would eventually see Tang's end. At one point, Li Gao, in order to try to avoid the troubles, took his family to Fengtian (奉天, in modern Xianyang, Shaanxi). Thereafter, when the major warlord Zhu Quanzhong the military governor (Jiedushi) of Xuanwu Circuit (宣武, headquartered in modern Kaifeng, Henan) forcibly moved Tang's penultimate emperor Emperor Zhaozong from Chang'an to Luoyang, the army under Zhu's rival warlord Li Maozhen the military governor of Fengxiang Circuit (鳳翔, headquartered in modern Baoji, Shaanxi) attacked and captured Fengtian. In the confusion after Fengtian's fall, Li Hao's younger brother(s) and sister(s) and his father Li Gao were all killed by the soldiers. Li Hao, then age 12, and his mother, however, escaped death. Li Hao took up residence at Xingping (興平, also in modern Xianyang), and stayed there for more than a decade. (Based on later events, it appear that his mother remained at Fengtian and that mother and son separated from this point on.)

After Tang's fall and fracturing into a number of successor states, there was a time when Liu Zhijun, a general of Li Maozhen's Qi state, sieged Bin Prefecture (邠州, with its capital being Xingping), then under the rule of Later Liang, founded by Zhu Quanzhong and then ruled by his son and successor Zhu Zhen — probably in 915, when Liu was recorded in history to have carried out such a siege — when Li tried to escape the city by scaling its walls out. He was captured, however, by Qi scout soldiers. Liu spoke with him and was impressed by him, and therefore retained him on staff; Liu also gave a daughter to him in marriage.

== During Qi and Former Shu ==
However, during Liu Zhijun's siege of Bin Prefecture, Qi's southwestern neighbor Former Shu had launched a major attack on Qi's Tianxiong Circuit (天雄, headquartered in modern Tianshui, Gansu), governed by Li Maozhen's nephew Li Jichong (李繼崇). With Tianxiong's capital Qin Prefecture (秦州) coming under siege, Li Jichong surrendered to Former Shu. The Former Shu army captured Liu's family, which had been living at Qin, and took them to the Former Shu capital Chengdu. Shocked by this development, Liu lifted the siege on Bin and fled to Former Shu himself with some 70 soldiers that he trusted.

Former Shu's emperor Wang Jian commissioned Liu the military governor of Wuxin Circuit (武信, headquartered in modern Suining, Sichuan). Li served as a secretary at Wuxin, under Liu. (It is unclear from historical records whether Li Hao might have been captured with the rest of Liu's family and taken to Chengdu, or whether Li Hao was among the 70 who fled from Qi to Former Shu with Liu.) Subsequently, when Liu was on campaigns on Wang's orders, Li would stay at Wuxin's capital Sui Prefecture (遂州) and handle the matters at headquarters.

However, Wang did not actually trust Liu, and, around the new year 918, he falsely accused Liu of plotting treason and had Liu executed. In the aftermaths of Liu's death, Li was removed from his position. It was not until after Wang's death and succession by his son Wang Zongyan (which occurred later in 918) that Li returned to governmental service, as the magistrate of Daojiang County (導江, in modern Dujiangyan, Sichuan). He was subsequently promoted to be Zhongshu Sheren (中書舍人, a midlevel official at the legislative bureau of government (中書省, Zhongshu Sheng)) and imperial scholar (翰林學士, Hanlin Xueshi).

At a later point — assuming that Li Hao's father Li Gao was killed in 905, this would be in 923 — Li Hao, apparently with Wang Yan's permission, sent two close associates to his home territory, which at that time would have been under the rule of Later Tang, which had conquered Later Liang — to look for his mother. When they found her, Li Hao requested Wang to allow him to go to the border between Former Shu and Later Tang to welcome her. Wang agreed, and further gave him a well-known horse and a golden saddle for his journey. Li Hao met his mother at Mount Qingni (青泥嶺, on the border of modern Longnan, Gansu and Hanzhong, Sichuan). It had been 18 years since mother and son had seen each other, and she cried bitterly in caressing his head, such that all who witnessed the event were greatly touched.

In 925, Former Shu came under a major attack by Later Tang, and the Former Shu general Wang Zongbi (Wang Yan's adoptive brother) seized control of the capital and forced Wang Yan to surrender to Later Tang. Wang Yan had Li Hao draft the surrender petition for him. The Later Tang commanding general Li Jiji the Prince of Wei (the son of the Later Tang emperor Li Cunxu) accepted Wang Yan's surrender, ending Former Shu.

== During Later Tang ==
After Wang Yan's surrender, he and his family, as well as Former Shu officials, were ordered to report from Chengdu to the Later Tang capital Luoyang. However, on the way, with Later Tang's own realm overrun by mutinies, Li Cunxu became concerned about Wang Yan, and had Wang Yan and his family put to death. The procession of Former Shu officials, presumably including Li Hao, eventually reached Luoyang after Li Cunxu himself was killed in a mutiny at Luoyang and succeeded by his adoptive brother Li Siyuan. Li Siyuan allowed the Former Shu officials to either remain at Luoyang or return to the Shu lands, and Li Hao apparently chose to return to the Shu lands, even though he had been given the title of acting Bingbu Langzhong (兵部郎中, a supervisory official at the ministry of defense (兵部, Bingbu)). Li Siyuan ordered Meng Zhixiang the military governor of Xichuan Circuit (西川, headquartered at Chengdu) and the financial surveyor of the region, Zhao Jiliang, to find Li Hao a suitable governmental position in the matter of finances. However, upon his arrival at Chengdu, Li Hao was not initially given any positions. It was not until Li Hao then met Meng and requested to return to Luoyang that Meng made Li Hao a secretary to himself in his role as governor (觀察使, Guanchashi).

The relationship between the Later Tang imperial government and Meng, as well as his neighboring military governor Dong Zhang of Dongchuan Circuit (東川, headquartered in Mianyang, Sichuan) (as Li Siyuan's powerful chief of staff, An Chonghui, suspected Meng's and Dong's loyalty as both had been commissioned by Li Cunxu), eventually deteriorated to such a point such that by 930, Meng and Dong were in alliance and openly rebelling against the imperial government. The two circuits' resistance were successful, and at the end of 931, Li Siyuan put An to death for this and other reasons, and then tried to reconcile with Meng and Dong. Meng was interested, but Dong was against this, and further was blocking the path and not allowing Meng's messengers to head to Luoyang. Li Hao advocated that Meng should not break the alliance himself first, but that no further attacks should be made against imperial possessions. Meng thereafter sent Li to Dongchuan's capital Zi Prefecture (梓州) to try to persuade Dong to agree to a reconciliation with the imperial government. Dong angrily refused. Upon returning to Chengdu, Li pointed out that Dong was showing signs that he may preemptively attack Xichuan, and that Meng should prepare for such an attack. When Dong eventually did attack Xichuan and almost reached Chengdu on his attack but was then defeated by the Xichuan general Zhao Tingyin, Meng had Li draft a declaration to the people of Dongchuan, trying to get them to turn against Dong. Dong was subsequently killed in a mutiny by his own officers, and Meng took over Dongchuan.

Upon the fall of Dongchuan, both Zhao and another senior Xichuan general, Li Renhan, wanted to be the military governor of Dongchuan, and their rivalry was threatening to destroy the cohesion of the Xichuan army. Meng was initially intending to let Zhao and Li Renhan settle the dispute themselves and then name one of them the military governor of Dongchuan. Li Hao advocated to Meng that he should assume the military governorship of Dongchuan himself (in addition to Xichuan) to settle the situation, and Meng agreed. Zhao still wanted to challenge Li Renhan to a duel. It was not until Li Hao persuaded Zhao that that challenge would be unwise and informed him that Meng would make him the military governor of Baoning Circuit (保寧, headquartered in modern Langzhong, Sichuan) that Zhao abandoned the idea.

In 932, Meng asked Li Hao to draft petitions on the behalf's of five acting military governors that Meng had commissioned for the region, asking Li Siyuan to create Meng the Prince of Shu and give him authorities to issue decrees on the emperor's behalf, as well as asking the emperor for official military governorship commissions for themselves. Li Hao pointed that if the requests were in these generals' names, then effectively, the authorities would be in these generals' hands. He advocated that Meng make these requests in his own name, and Meng agreed. Li Hao subsequently drafted the petition for Meng. Li Siyuan subsequently granted the requests — giving Meng authority to commission all officials in the region, including military governors and prefects.

== During Later Shu ==
=== Prior to chancellorship ===
In 934 (shortly after Li Siyuan's death and succession by his son Li Conghou), Meng Zhixiang declared himself emperor of a new state of Shu (historically known as Later Shu). He made Li Hao the deputy minister of rites (禮部侍郎, Libu Shilang) and imperial scholar (翰林學士, Hanlin Xueshi).

Later in the year, Meng died and was succeeded by his son Meng Chang. Early in Meng Chang's reign, Li was made the deputy minister of defense (兵部侍郎, Bingbu Shilang) and given the title of prefect of Han Prefecture (漢州, in modern Deyang, Sichuan). In 941, as part of Meng Chang's reform, ending the practice that high level officials and generals would be given titles as circuit military governors but would remain at Chengdu and therefore were causing their circuits' governance to be neglected, Meng commissioned a number of civilian officials as acting military governors — in Li's case, he was made the acting military governor of Wude Circuit (i.e., Dongchuan); he was also given the title of chief imperial scholar (翰林學士承旨). (However, Meng reversed this reform in 944 for reasons lost to history; presumably, Li was recalled to the imperial government at that time.) At one point, Meng wanted to give two of Li's sons positions in the imperial government. Li declined, instead requesting that those positions be given to sons of two colleagues he served with on Liu Zhijun's staff. Meng greatly praised him for this, and agreed to give positions to the sons of Li's colleagues — as well as Li's sons.

In 948, there was a major shakeup in the Later Shu imperial government. Long-time chancellor Zhang Ye was arrogant and wasteful, and he had seized many people's properties, drawing resentment. He was also protecting fugitives and putting people who owed him money in jail. The imperial guard commander Sun Hanshao (孫漢韶), who had previous conflicts with Zhang, thus submitted an accusation to Meng that Zhang and his son Zhang Jizhao (張繼昭) were plotting treason. Li Hao and the officer An Siqian (安思謙) concurred in these accusations. Meng thus put Zhang Ye and Zhang Jizhao to death. He subsequently also forced the chief of staff Wang Chuhui and the senior general Zhao Tingyin into retirement. In the aftermaths, Li and Xu Guangpu were made chancellors with the designation Tong Zhongshu Menxia Pingzhangshi (同中書門下平章事); he was also given the posts of Menxia Shilang (門下侍郎, the deputy head of the examination bureau of government (門下省, Menxia Sheng) and minister of census (戶部尚書, Hubu Shangshu).

=== As chancellor ===
One of the additional responsibilities that Li Hao took over after becoming chancellor was overseeing the editing of the imperial history. At his request, four well-known lower-level officials were assigned to serve under him in that task. Shortly after, he was given the additional title of Zuo Pushe (左僕射, one of the heads of the executive bureau (尚書省, Shangshu Sheng)).

At one point, Meng Chang ordered that the portraits of the high-level officials who served under Meng Zhixiang be painted in the corridors of Meng Zhixiang's temple. However, as he viewed Li Hao as having particularly contributed to Meng Zhixiang's strategies, he had Li's portrait painted inside the main hall. Li subsequently submitted 100 volumes of the various communiques he wrote for Meng Zhixiang to Meng Chang. Meng Chang awarded him with a number of precious vessels and silk. Shortly after, he also put Li in charge of the treasury and taxation.

In 951, under Li's supervision, 40 volumes of the historical records of Meng Chang's reign were completed. Meng wanted to read them, but Li refused to let him do so, pointing out that traditionally emperors should not read the historical records of their own reigns (to preserve the historians' independence). Thereafter, there was a time when he left governmental service when his mother died, to observe a mourning period, but he was recalled to the imperial government after 100 days.

It was said that serving in many such high level positions for a long time allowed Li Hao to accumulate great wealth, and he lived in luxury, maintaining at his mansion several hundred concubines and servant girls. At a time when there was a good relationship between Meng and Southern Tang's emperor Li Jing, Li Jing sent his official Zhao Jizha (趙季劄) as an emissary to Later Shu. Before his departure from Southern Tang, Zhao purchased the edict that Emperor Wuzong of Tang had issued making Li Hao's claimed ancestor Li Shen a chancellor, and presented it to Li Hao as a gift. Li Hao held a grand feast in Zhao's honor and gave Zhao a large gift of silk in gratitude.

In 958, there was a time when the lower-level official Zhang Jiuling (章九齡) presented a petition to Meng Chang, stating that the government was run by wicked people. When Meng asked Zhang who the wicked were, Zhang stated that he was referring to Li Hao and the chief of staff Wang Zhaoyuan. Meng, angered by the accusation, exiled Zhang.

Late in 958, Gao Baorong the ruler of Jingnan, which was then formally a vassal of Later Zhou (which, by that time, ruled central China and which had just dealt Southern Tang a major blow in a campaign, forcing Southern Tang to cede the territory between the Yangtze River and Huai River to Later Zhou), wrote Meng to try to persuade him to also formally submit to Later Zhou as a vassal. Meng gathered his high-level officials and generals for a meeting to discuss the situation, as he was concerned about a Later Zhou invasion, with Li Hao presiding over the meeting. When the generals opposed submitting to Later Zhou, Meng had Li write a letter back to Gao, rejecting the proposal. Subsequently, Later Zhou did consider an invasion, but the Later Zhou emperor Guo Rong subsequently fell ill and died, ending those plans. Subsequently, the Later Zhou general Zhao Kuangyin seized power in a coup, establishing his own Song dynasty as its Emperor Taizu.)

There was a time when Meng had Li Hao oversee a number of officials in compiling an official history of Former Shu. They completed a 40-volume work and submitted it to Meng. Meng created him the Duke of Zhao, and thereafter also gave him the titles of Sikong (司空, one of the Three Excellencies) as well as military governor of Wuxin Circuit. (The Wuxin commission came in 959, but it was not clear whether the Sikong commission and the creation as Duke of Zhao also came at the same time.) He was also given the additional responsibilities of overseeing the salt and iron monopolies, as well as the imperial temple. Meng gave official positions to four of his grandsons, and gave a daughter (the Princess Fengyi) in marriage to his son Li Xiaolian (李孝連).

In 962, Meng Chang created his son Meng Xuanzhe the Prince of Qin Crown Prince. For reasons unclear to history, Meng Chang also ordered that the new crown prince's attendants and people who announced his arrival should refer him as "His Imperial Highness" rather than "the Crown Prince." Li Hao, believing this to be irregular, argued against the order, and the order was rescinded.

By 963, Li Hao had been sufficiently concerned about the growing power of Song that he was advocating to Meng that Later Shu formally submit to Song as a vassal. Meng initially agreed and was going to send an emissary to Song to submit, but Wang Zhaoyuan opposed it, and Meng changed his mind. Meng subsequently tried to strengthen his defenses at the borders to defend against a potential Song attack.

Song eventually launched its attack in late 964, and Wang, having an inflated sense of his own abilities, volunteered to command the armies against Song. At a feast that Li Hao, at Meng's order, held to send Wang off, Wang stated to Li, "My mission would not only result in stopping the enemy, but I will lead these 20 to 30 thousand fierce-looking young men to easily conquer the Central Plains!" However, instead, Wang's army was repeatedly defeated by the Song general Wang Quanbin (王全斌), eventually resulting in the capture of Wang Zhaoyuan and his deputy Zhao Chongtao (趙崇韜). Upon hearing of this, Meng decided to surrender, and he had Li draft the surrender petition. As Li had also drafted Wang Yan's surrender petition, someone who wanted to satirize Li secretly, at night, wrote, "The mansion of the Lis, traditional drafters of surrender petitions." Wang Quanbin subsequently accepted the surrender, ending Later Shu.

== During Song dynasty ==
After surrender, Meng Chang, his family members, and a number of high level Later Shu officials, including Li Hao, were taken to the Song capital Kaifeng. At Kaifeng, they formally wore mourning clothes and surrendered to the Song emperor in a grand ceremony. Emperor Taizu accepted their surrender and treated them with respect. He awarded Li Hao a mansion and gave him the title of minister of public works (工部尚書, Gongbu Shangshu), and gave his sons Li Xiaofeng (李孝逢) and Li Xiaolian positions in the Song imperial government as well. Shortly after, Li Hao's family members who remained at Chengdu headed for Kaifeng down the Yangtze. When they reached Yiling (夷陵, in modern Yichang, Hubei), Li Hao's wife died. (It was not clearly stated in the historical records whether this was Liu Zhijun's daughter.) When the news of her death reached Li Hao, Li Hao became greatly saddened, such that he fell ill and died shortly after himself. He was given posthumous honors.

== Notes and references ==
- History of Song, vol. 479.
- Spring and Autumn Annals of the Ten Kingdoms, vol. 52.
- Zizhi Tongjian, vols. 274, 275, 277, 278, 282, 286, 288, 294.
- Xu Zizhi Tongjian, vols. 2, 3, 4.
