= Wang Zhaoyuan (general) =

Historical Chinese general

Personal details
- Born: late 900s or early 910s Chengdu, Former Shu
- Died: 975 or early 976 Unknown, Song dynasty

Chinese name
- Traditional Chinese: 王昭遠
- Simplified Chinese: 王昭远
Transcriptions
Standard Mandarin
- Hanyu Pinyin: Wáng Zhāoyuǎn

Wang Zhaoyuan (died c. 975) was the overall commander of the Later Shu army resisting the Song dynasty invasion of 964–965. Incompetent and conceited, Wang Zhaoyuan was nevertheless well-trusted by the Later Shu emperor Meng Chang, with whom he was particularly close. About 2 months after he boasted that he would go on to conquer the Song "as easily as turning one's palms", he was captured by the Song army following successive defeats. The Later Shu fell a few days later.

== Early life ==
Wang Zhaoyuan was from Chengdu, the capital of the Former Shu dynasty. Orphaned at an early age, he followed the Buddhist monk Zhiyin (智諲) and became a samanera when he was around 12 years old. The Former Shu was conquered by the Later Tang in 925, and in the following year general Meng Zhixiang arrived to assume governorship (jiedushi) of Xichuan (西川). One day, Meng Zhixiang hosted many monks in the city to a grand feast at his yamen, and Wang Zhaoyuan went with Zhiyin. At the banquet, his cleverness impressed Meng Zhixiang. Thus Wang Zhaoyuan became a personal servant to Meng Zhixiang's son Meng Chang (then called Meng Renzan), who had just started school. He and Meng Chang (several years his junior) became particularly close.

== Under the Later Shu ==
Meng Zhixiang founded the Later Shu dynasty in 934, but died just a few months on the throne. He was succeeded by the 15-year-old Meng Chang, who made Wang Zhaoyuan the "Commissioner of Roll-Up Curtain" (卷簾使). Some time later Wang Zhaoyuan was made the "Commissioner of Tea and Wine Storage" (茶酒庫使).

In 948, after putting grand councilor Zhang Ye to death over suspicions of treason, Meng Chang began to centralize power. After getting the aging chief of staff (shumishi) Wang Chuhui retire, Wang Zhaoyuan along with Gao Yanzhao (高延昭), was made a "Commissioner of Communications and Memorials" (通奏使) with a position in the Bureau of Military Affairs. It was said that Meng Chang discussed all important matters with them and allowed them free rein over the use of the national treasury, with nary a question asked. Wang Zhaojun was also given the governorship of Mei Prefecture and Yongping (永平, i.e., Qiong Prefecture). A few months later, he became the governor of Zhaowu (昭武, i.e. Li Prefecture). After more than a year, he became the governor of Kui Prefecture.

Meng Chang's mother Empress Dowager Li had often told her son that Wang Zhaoyuan was not to be entrusted, but Meng Chang didn't heed her advice. He made Wang Zhaoyuan grand councilor and governor of Shannan West Circuit (山南西道), one of the 3 major circuits under Later Shu's control. When Wang Zhaoyuan returned to the imperial court in Chengdu to thank the emperor, he requested to be relieved of the "Commissioner of Communications and Memorials" post, and Meng Chang granted this request.

The Song dynasty was founded in 960, replacing the Later Zhou dynasty as Later Shu's new northeastern neighbor. Fearful of Song's powerful military, Meng Chang wanted to establish diplomatic relations with them, but Wang Zhaoyuan adamantly opposed. Because he enjoyed reading about military theories, Wang Zhaoyuan often likened himself to Zhuge Liang, a brilliant 3rd-century strategist who also served a "Shu" dynasty (the Shu Han). Wang Zhaoyuan reasoned that because of several strategic natural barriers, the Later Shu was impenetrable to foreign invasion. He advised Meng Chang to form an alliance with the (militarily weak) Northern Han dynasty instead.

In December 964, the Song dynasty finally began the long-planned invasion with 60,000 soldiers. Meng Chang named Wang Zhaoyuan overall commander and asked grand councilor Li Hao to send off the troops from Chengdu. At the farewell banquet, Wang Zhaoyuan got drunk, and grabbing Li Hao's arm, he bragged:

For this trip, I will not just defeat the enemy. I will lead these 20,000 or 30,000 ferocious young men, with tattoos on their faces, and conquer the Central Plains (zhongyuan)! As easily as turning one's palms!

Trying to imitate Zhuge Liang, he had an iron hand fan in his hand. Once he arrived in Hanyuan, the Song force already took Jianmen Pass, the most strategic pass of the Roads to Shu. Wang Zhaoyuan was so frightened he could not speak properly. Bedridden and unable to get up, he handed military decisions over to his assistant, Zhao Chongtao (趙崇韜). After Zhao Chongtao was defeated and captured, Wang Zhaoyuan threw away his armor and weapons and fled, eventually hiding himself in a peasant home. When he was captured, his eyes were swollen because he had been crying. He kept reciting a line from a poem by Luo Yin, which lamented Zhuge Liang's lack of success despite his mental genius:

Even a hero is limited when luck isn't on his side (運去英雄不自由)

== Under the Song dynasty ==
After Later Shu's conquest, Emperor Taizu of Song forgave him and gave him official titles. He served as a diplomat to Đại Cồ Việt (Đinh dynasty) in the 970s.

== Notes and references ==
- Li Tao (1183). Xu Zizhi Tongjian Changbian (續資治通鑑長編) [Extended Continuation to Zizhi Tongjian] (in Chinese).
- Toqto'a; et al., eds. (1345). Song Shi (宋史) [History of Song] (in Chinese).
- Wu Renchen (1669). Shiguo Chunqiu (十國春秋) [Springs and Autumns of the Ten States] (in Chinese).
