= Meng Chang =

Emperor of Later Shu from 934 to 965

Meng Chang 孟昶
- "Last Ruler" of Later Shu (more...)

2nd and last emperor of Later Shu
- Reign: September 10, 934 – February 23, 965
- Predecessor: Meng Zhixiang (Emperor Gaozu), father
- Born: 919; Taiyuan
- Died: July 12, 965 modern Kaifeng, Henan
- Spouse: Consort Xu (Madame Huarui)
- Issue: Meng Xuanzhe (孟玄喆), son; Meng Xuanjue (孟玄珏), son; Meng Xuanbao (孟玄寶), son; Daughter (m. Yi Chongdu); Daughter (m. Han Chongsui); Daughter (m. Zhao Wenliang); Daughter (m. Li Xiaolian); Daughter (m. Wu Kegong); Daughter (m. Zhao Chengxu)
Names
- Surname: Mèng (孟); Given name: Rénzàn (仁贊), later changed to Chǎng (昶); Courtesy name: Bǎoyuán (保元)
Era dates
- Míngdé (明德) (inherited from Meng Zhixiang): 934 – 938: Year 1: 18 January 934 – 5 February 935; Year 2: 6 February 935 – 26 January 936; Year 3: 27 January 936 – 12 February 937; Year 4: 13 February 937 – 1 February 938; Guǎngzhèng (廣政): 938 – 966: Year 1: 2 February 938 – 22 January 939 Year 2: 23 January 939 – 10 February 940 Year 3: 11 February 940 – 29 January 941 Year 4: 30 January 941 – 19 January 942 Year 5: 20 January 942 – 7 February 943 Year 6: 8 February 943 – 27 January 944 Year 7: 28 January 944 – 14 February 945 Year 8: 15 February 945 – 4 February 946 Year 9: 5 February 946 – 24 January 947 Year 10: 25 January 947 – 12 February 948 Year 11: 13 February 948 – 31 January 949 Year 12: 1 February 949 – 20 January 950 Year 13: 21 January 950 – 8 February 951 Year 14: 9 February 951 – 29 January 952 Year 15: 30 January 952 – 17 January 953 Year 16: 18 January 953 – 5 February 954 Year 17: 6 February 954 – 26 January 955 Year 18: 27 January 955 – 14 February 956 Year 19: 15 February 956 – 2 February 957 Year 20: 3 February 957 – 22 January 958 Year 21: 23 January 958 – 10 February 959 Year 22: 11 February 959 – 30 January 960 Year 23: 31 January 960 – 19 January 961 Year 24: 20 January 961 – 7 February 962 Year 25: 8 February 962 – 27 January 963 Year 26: 28 January 963 – 15 February 964 Year 27: 16 February 964 – 4 February 965 Year 28: 5 February 965 – 24 January 966
Regnal name
- Emperor Ruìwén Yīngwǔ Rénshèng Míngxiào (睿文英武仁聖明孝皇帝)
Posthumous name
- Prince Gongxiao of Chu (楚恭孝王)
- House: Meng
- Dynasty: Later Shu
- Father: Meng Zhixiang
- Mother: Empress Dowager Li

Meng Chang (孟昶) (919–965), originally Meng Renzan (孟仁贊), courtesy name Baoyuan (保元), posthumously honored as Prince Gongxiao of Chu (楚恭孝王) by the Emperor Taizu of Song, was the second and last emperor of the Later Shu dynasty of China during the Five Dynasties and Ten Kingdoms period. He ruled from 934 until 965, when his state was conquered by the Northern Song dynasty. He died soon afterwards.

Meng ruled largely peacefully for three decades. The Later Shu became one of the centers for the arts and literature, where it flourished with support from the court. An anthology of lyric poetry known as the Amidst the Flowers Anthology was compiled in 940. It was also among the most stable of the southern states, but it also stagnated militarily and politically. When the Northern Song usurped the Later Zhou dynasty, the last of the Five Dynasties, in 960, the Emperor Taizu of Song made it his mission to reunify China proper. Northern Song forces forced Meng Chang to surrender in 965.

== Background ==
Meng Renzan was born in 919, in Taiyuan. His father Meng Zhixiang was then an officer under Li Cunxu the Prince of Jin, and had married Li Cunxu's cousin as his wife. Meng Renzan, however, was not born of her, but rather of a different Lady Li—one who had previously been a concubine of Li Cunxu's, but whom Li Cunxu had awarded to Meng Zhixiang as a concubine. He was Meng Zhixiang's fifth son but the third to grow up.

== During Later Tang ==
In 923, Li Cunxu declared himself emperor of a new Later Tang, and shortly after destroyed archrival Later Liang and took over its territory. In 925, he further sent an army and destroyed Later Tang's southwestern neighbor Former Shu (whose territory would eventually be the territory for Later Shu). He commissioned Meng Renzan's father Meng Zhixiang as the military governor (jiedushi) of Former Shu's main territory Xichuan Circuit (西川, headquartered in modern Chengdu, Sichuan). However, shortly after, the entire Later Tang realm was thrown into confusion due to a series of mutinies, and Li Cunxu himself was killed in a mutiny at the capital Luoyang in 926. He was succeeded as Later Tang's emperor by his adoptive brother Li Siyuan.

Meng Zhixiang, while legally a subject of the new Later Tang emperor, shortly began to develop frictions with Li Siyuan's regime, particularly with Li Siyuan's powerful chief of staff An Chonghui, who suspected both Meng (on account of his marital relations with Li Cunxu's cousin) and Meng's neighboring military governor, Dong Zhang of the Dongchuan Circuit (東川, headquartered in modern Mianyang, Sichuan), and tensions began to escalate, particularly after Meng executed an official that Li Siyuan sent to be the monitor of the Xichuan army, Li Yan (李嚴), in 927. At that time, Meng had sent messengers to escort his wife (who had been created the Grand Princess Qionghua), Meng Renzan's mother Lady Li, and Meng Renzan to Xichuan. When they reached Fengxiang Circuit (鳳翔, headquartered in modern Baoji, Shaanxi), the news of Meng's execution of Li Yan reached Fengxiang. Fengxiang's military governor Li Congyan thus detained them at Fengxiang for some time, but Li Siyuan subsequently ordered that they be allowed to continue to proceed to Xichuan. (An older brother of his, whose name was lost to history and who was born of the Grand Princess, however, was not apparently not allowed to proceed to Xichuan.) After reaching Xichuan, Meng Renzan, considered to be intelligent in his young age, was given the title of military commander (行軍司馬, Xingjun Sima) of the Xichuan army.

== During Meng Zhixiang's reign as emperor of Later Shu ==
Meng Zhixiang later consolidated his control over the region, taking control of Dongchuan and nearby smaller circuits as well, and also carried the Later Tang-bestowed title of Prince of Shu. In 934, shortly after Li Siyuan's death, Meng Zhixiang declared himself emperor of a new state of Shu (historically known as Later Shu). He bestowed on Meng Renzan the titles of acting Taibao (太保), military governor of Dongchuan, director of Chongsheng Palace (崇聖宮), and honorary chancellor (同中書門下平章事, Tong Zhongshu Menxia Pingzhangshi).

Meng Zhixiang, however, had been suffering from a stroke for years, and by fall 934, he was extremely ill. He created Meng Renzan Crown Prince and regent. After entrusting Meng Renzan to the chancellor Zhao Jiliang, the generals Li Renhan and Zhao Tingyin, the chief of staff Wang Chuhui, and the commanders of the imperial guards Zhang Gongduo and Hou Hongshi (侯弘實), he died that same night. Three days later, Meng Renzan took the throne and, pursuant to the will Meng Zhixiang left, changed his name to Meng Chang. He was 15 at that time.

== Reign ==
=== Early reign ===
Immediately after Meng Chang's assumption of the throne, Li Renhan insisted on being put in command of the imperial guards. Meng Chang initially reluctantly agreed and put him in command, making Zhao Tingyin his deputy. However, Zhang Gongduo and several of Meng Chang's close associates thereafter accused Li Renhan of plotting treason. After consulting with Zhao Jiliang and Zhao Tingyin, Meng decided to arrest him while he was attending an imperial meeting, and then put him to death, along with his son Li Jihong (李繼宏) and several associates. Shocked by the development, the senior general Li Zhao (李肇), who had previously refused to bow to the young emperor, changed his attitude and became very submissive. Meng's associates advocated putting Li Zhao to death, too, but Meng did not do so, instead forcing Li Zhao into retirement.

In 935, Meng honored his mother Consort Li empress dowager. Meanwhile, the new Later Tang emperor Li Congke launched an army and tried to recover Shannan West Circuit (山南西道, headquartered in modern Hanzhong, Shaanxi), which had surrendered to Later Shu in the last days of Meng Zhixiang's reign. The attack, however, was repelled by the Later Shu general Li Yanhou (李延厚).

In 936, Li Congke was overthrown by his brother-in-law Shi Jingtang, ending Later Tang. Shi established his own Later Jin, and, in 937, sent emissaries to Later Shu to notify Meng of this. Meng wrote back, using protocols fitting for coequal states.

In 939, the non-Han chieftain Peng Shichou (彭士愁), who was formally a Later Shu vassal (as the prefect of Xi Prefecture (溪州, in modern Xiangxi Tujia and Miao Autonomous Prefecture, Hunan), attacked two prefectures belonging to Later Shu's southeastern neighbor Chu (which was formally a Later Jin vassal)—Chen (辰州, in modern Huaihua, Hunan) and Li (澧州, in modern Changde, Hunan)—and sought aid from the Later Shu imperial government to further advance. Meng refused, finding that the campaign was too far away from Later Shu proper. Forces sent by Chu's prince Ma Xifan subsequently defeated Peng, who surrendered to Chu. His territory became Chu territory.

Ever since Later Shu's founding, major generals had been frequently given military governorships but would remain at the capital Chengdu to continue to oversee imperial army operations. This led to their neglect of the governance of the circuits as they left the governance to staff members, who were often corrupt and unresponsive to the concerns of the people. Meng became aware of this and, in 941, he reformed the situation by stripping Zhao Tingyin, Wang, and Zhang of their military governorships while giving them other honorary titles. He subsequently sent five civilian officials to five circuits to serve as their acting military governors.

Also in 941, when Later Jin's military governor of Shannan East Circuit (山南東道, headquartered in modern Xiangyang, Hubei), An Congjin, was plotting to rebel against Shi, he sent emissaries to Meng seeking aid, requesting that Later Shu attack Later Jin's Jin (金州, in modern Ankang, Shaanxi) and Shang (商州, in modern Shangluo, Shaanxi) Prefectures to distract Later Jin's forces. After discussing with his officials, Meng concluded that sending a small army would not substantially aid An, and sending a large army would create great logistical problems. He thus declined to aid An. (An was subsequently defeated by the general Gao Xingzhou, and committed suicide.)

In 943, Meng issued an edict for general selections of females ranging from age 12 to 19, to fill his palace with concubines. This greatly disturbed the people, and there were many households that quickly married off their daughters to avoid having the daughters selected. When the county magistrate Chen Jizhi (陳及之) submitted a petition urging the cancellation of the edict, Meng rewarded Chen for his honesty, but did not end the selection process. The women who were selected were sorted into 14 ranks of concubines.

In 944, for reasons not stated in history, Meng reversed his earlier reform with having actual acting military governors at the circuits, and again had major generals and chancellors assume military governorships remotely.

Later in 944, the Later Jin officer Wang Junhuai (王君懷) defected to Later Shu and volunteered to guide a Later Shu army to capture Later Jin's Jie (階州) and Cheng (成州, both in modern Longnan, Gansu) Prefectures. A subsequent Later Shu army incursion, however, was repelled by an army launched from Later Jin's Qin Prefecture (秦州, in modern Tianshui, Gansu).

=== Middle reign ===
Around the new year 947, with a major Khitan Liao dynasty invasion force commanded by its Emperor Taizong approaching the Later Jin capital Kaifeng, the Later Jin emperor Shi Chonggui (Shi Jingtang's nephew and successor) surrendered to Liao. Most Later Jin regional governors quickly submitted petitions to submit to the Liao emperor, as he claimed to be the legitimate emperor over the Han and the Khitan alike. However, one of them, He Chongjian (何重建) the military governor of Xiongwu Circuit (雄武, headquartered at Qin Prefecture) refused to submit to Liao, and, after executing a Liao emissary to his circuit, surrendered his circuit (including Qin, Jie, and Cheng Prefectures) to Later Shu. Subsequently, as He Chongjian advocated, Later Shu forces also attacked Feng Prefecture (鳳州, in modern Baoji), and Feng's defender Shi Fengjun (石奉頵)—a member of Later Jin's imperial clan—also surrendered that prefecture to Later Shu.

Due to the Liao emperor's misrule of the former Later Jin territory, however, many Han rebellions rose against him, with the strongest being led by the Later Jin general Liu Zhiyuan, who claimed imperial title as emperor of a new Later Han. He soon had control over most of the former Later Jin territory—as Emperor Taizong withdrew and later died. However, the Liao-commissioned military governor of Jinchang Circuit (晉昌, headquartered in modern Xi'an, Shaanxi), Zhao Kuangzan (趙匡贊)—a son of the major Liao general Zhao Yanshou—feared that the Later Han emperor would not tolerate him, and therefore instead sent emissaries submitting his circuit to Later Shu. At Zhao's request, Meng Chang launched a large army and put it under the command of the former Later Jin general Zhang Qianzhao (張虔昭), who had submitted to Later Shu, to aid Zhao. He also had Wang Chuhui write Hou Yi (侯益) the Later Han military governor of Fengxiang, persuading Hou to submit to Later Shu as well. Hou agreed, and the Later Shu army approaching Jinchang's capital Jingzhao Municipality (京兆) appeared to be ready to add large amounts of territory to Later Shu. However, Zhao's staff member Li Shu (李恕) persuaded Zhao to change his mind and submit to Later Han instead; he sent Li to Later Han's capital Kaifeng to beg Liu's forgiveness. Hearing Zhao's change of mind, Hou also sent messengers to Liu, begging forgiveness as well. Liu sent the general Wang Jingchong toward Jinchang and Fengxiang to prepare to combat the Later Shu troops, with instructions to attack Zhao and Hou if they again change their mind. Zhao, however, left for Kaifeng quickly, and Hou, after some hesitation, also did so, allowing Wang's army to take over control of their circuits. (Wang considered killing Hou when Hou hesitated, but as Liu Zhiyuan had just died around that time, and Wang was concerned that his son and successor Liu Chengyou was unaware of the deceased emperor's instructions. Hou, hearing news of this, quickly left for Kaifeng.) Wang subsequently defeated the Later Shu army in relatively minor engagements, leading to the Later Shu army's withdrawal, ending Later Shu's hopes of large territorial gains for the moment.

However, soon came another potential chance for territory gains. Hou, upon arrival at Kaifeng, gave many gifts to the key officials that Liu Zhiyuan instructed to assist the new young emperor Liu Chengyou, and was able to gain substantial influence at the Later Han court, including being made the mayor of the capital. Resentful that Wang considered killing him, he spread rumors to damage Wang's reputation. Upon hearing this, Wang became apprehensive. Further, at that time, two rebellions had risen against Later Han—with the major general Li Shouzhen rebelling at Huguo Circuit (護國, headquartered in modern Yuncheng, Shanxi) and the officer Zhao Siwan rebelling at Jingzhao. Wang thus decided to rebel as well, allying himself with Li and Zhao Siwan, while at the same time also sending emissaries to submit to Later Shu. Zhao Siwan also did so. Later Shu launched troops to try to aid Wang and Zhao Siwan, but the Later Shu army was initially repelled by the Later Han general Zhao Hui (趙暉). Meng then launched a larger army under the command of An Siqian (安思謙) the military governor of Shannan West to try to aid Wang and Zhao Siwan, despite the urging by the chancellor Wu Zhaoyi that doing so was risky. An's army, however, was bogged down at the front with Later Han and, when it ran out of food, was forced to withdraw. With hopes of Later Shu aid gone and Zhao Hui sieging his capital Fengxiang Municipality, Wang committed suicide. Zhao Siwan surrendered to the Later Han forces, but when he did not quickly leave for Kaifeng, the Later Han general Guo Congyi (郭從義) arrested and killed him.

While the Later Shu army was combating Later Han forces, there was also a major shakeup within the Later Shu imperial government. The chancellor Zhang Ye was arrogant and wasteful, and he had seized many people's properties, drawing resentment. He was also protecting fugitives and putting people who owed him money in jail. The imperial guard commander Sun Hanshao (孫漢韶), who had previous conflicts with Zhang, thus submitted an accusation to Meng that Zhang and his son Zhang Jizhao (張繼昭) were plotting treason. Believing in Sun's accusations, Meng arrested and put Zhang Ye and Zhang Jizhao to death. Meanwhile, An also laid similar accusations against Wang Chuhui and Zhao Tingyin. However, Meng did not wish to kill either of them, and allowed them to retire. Believing that much had been hidden from him while Zhang Ye and Wang Chuhui were in control of the government, Meng set up chests in front of the palace, allowing the people to make secret reports to him by putting them in the chests. Li Hao and Xu Guangpu replaced Zhang as chancellor (although Xu was shortly after removed after being accused of having sexually harassed the daughter of Former Shu's founding emperor Wang Jian), while no one immediately succeeded Wang Chuhui as chief of staff—Meng had wanted to make two close associates, Gao Yanzhao and Wang Zhaoyuan his chiefs of staff, but as they were perceived to lack sufficient seniority, gave them lesser offices and made them acting chiefs of staff, while giving them free rein in the matters of finance. Wang Zhaoyuan, in particular, was allowed to take from the treasury at will, with no accounting of what he took.

In 950, Meng created his brothers and sons imperial princes.

In 951, at Gao's insistence, he was removed from the post of acting chief of staff. Meng put his cousin (the son of Meng Zhixiang's sister the Princess of Bao), Yi Shenzheng, acting chief of staff to replace Gao. It was said that he entrusted much of the affairs of state to Yi, and while Yi was ambitious and hardworking, he was also greedy and wasteful. With Yi and Wang Zhaoyuan in charge of much of the governance, it was said that Meng's governance of Later Shu began to decline from that point.

In 952, a major flood occurred at the Later Shu capital Chengdu, such that more than 5,000 people drowned and more than 1,000 homes were destroyed. Even four of the halls at the imperial temple were damaged. Meng issued a general pardon and authorized stipends for the victims of the flood.

Later in 952, there was a disturbance at Wude Circuit (i.e., Dongchuan). The acting military governor of Wude, Shao Yanjun (邵延鈞) had been disrespectful to the monitor of the Wude army, Wang Chengpi (王承丕), such that Wang became very resentful of him. He took the officer Sun Qin (孫欽)—who was not aware of his plot—to see Shao. At the meeting, Wang killed Shao and then ordered his family be slaughtered, claiming to Sun that he had been given a secret imperial edict to execute Shao. Sun initially believed him, but when Sun then insisted on seeing the edict, Wang stated, "I can make you powerful. Do not question me too much." Sun, by this time aware that there was no such edict, fled, and mobilized the army. They attacked and captured Wang. He then executed Wang and delivered Wang's head to Chengdu.

In 953, at Wu Zhaoyi's advocacy (including Wu's spending of personal wealth to build schools), Meng agreed to authorize printings of the Four Books and Five Classics, to promote learning—as the study of these Confucian classics had been neglected since the fall of the Tang dynasty. It was said that after this, literature was again valued in the Shu realms.

Meanwhile, the people of the Later Shu realm had been much resentful of An Siqian's involvement in Zhang Ye's death and in the removal of Zhao Tingyin. An was also blamed for the failures of the Later Shu army in aiding Wang Jingchong. By 954, when An was commanding the imperial guards, the security measures at the Later Shu palace itself had been strengthened, and An came to believe that Meng was doing so because Meng suspected him. Further, he was harsh with the imperial guard soldiers, often putting soldiers to death. Indeed, at times when he dismissed soldiers from imperial guard service due to his dissatisfactions with them, but Meng overruled him and kept the soldiers on the imperial guard rolls, he would find ways to have those soldiers killed. Believing the accusations by the official Wang Zao (王藻) that An was plotting treason, Meng had An and his three sons arrested and executed. He also removed Sun Hanshao from his imperial guard command, apparently concerned about Sun as well. The imperial guard command was divided between 10 generals.

=== Late reign ===
In 955, Meng Chang became aware that the emperor of Later Zhou—the successor state to Later Han's main territory—Guo Rong, was planning an invasion to recover Feng, Qin, Cheng, and Jie Prefectures. He was planning on sending his attendant Zhao Jizha (趙季札) to those prefectures to review their preparedness for the impending Later Zhou invasion. Before departing Chengdu, Zhao, who was ambitious and considered himself to have both administrative and military abilities, stated to Meng his belief that neither Han Jixun (韓繼勳) the military governor of Xiongwu Circuit nor Wang Wandi (王萬迪) the prefect of Feng Prefecture had the abilities to lead large armies to defend against the Later Zhou attack. Rather, he recommended himself to do so. Meng thus made Zhao the monitor of the Xiongwu army and gave him 1,000 elite soldiers to accompany him to Xiongwu to prepare the defense. Meng also ordered Wang Zhaoyuan to review the troop situation on the northern border with Later Zhou.

Shortly after, Later Zhou launched its attack, with its armies commanded by the generals Wang Jing (王景) the military governor of Fengxiang and Xiang Xun (向訓). On the way to the front, Zhao, hearing of the actual launching of the Later Zhou attack, panicked, and fled back to Chengdu by himself, causing a general panic in the city as well, as the populace to believe that the Later Shu army had already suffered a major defeat. When Meng met him to inquire him as to what was happening on the front, he was unable to answer. In anger, Meng put him to death. Meng sent the generals Li Tinggui (李廷珪) and Gao Yanchou (高彥儔) to the front to combat the Later Zhou army. He also sent emissaries to other rival states of Later Zhou's—Northern Han (which claimed legitimate succession from Later Han) to the north, and Southern Tang to the east—to try to form alliances. Both Northern Han's emperor Liu Jun and Southern Tang's emperor Li Jing agreed to the alliance, but did not appear to actually carry out actions to help counter the Later Zhou attack on Later Shu.

Meanwhile, the Later Shu forces were initially able to repel the Later Zhou attack, but eventually, after a battle in which the Later Shu general Wang Luan (王巒) was captured by Wang Jing, the Later Shu army went into a panic, forcing Li and Gao to retreat. Han then abandoned Qin Prefecture and fled back to Chengdu; his assistant Zhao Pin (趙玭) surrendered the city. Subsequently, Cheng and Jie also surrendered to Later Zhou. Wang Jing subsequently captured Feng Prefecture as well after a siege. In fear, Meng wrote Guo, requesting peace between the two states; on the letter, he referred to himself as "Emperor of the Great Shu." Displeased that Meng would dare to consider himself an equal, Guo refused to respond. In fear that Guo would launch a further attack deeper into Later Shu territory, Meng mobilized large armies and stationed them at Jianmen Pass and Baidi. As the armies' expenses were causing a drain on the imperial treasury, he minted money with iron and began to collect iron items as tax payments, causing distress among the people. (However, with Guo shortly after launching a major attack on Southern Tang, he did not continue his attack on Later Shu at this point.)

In 956, Meng, while maintaining the division of the imperial guards between 10 generals, put Li Tinggui in overall command of the imperial guards. Meanwhile, though, the popular opinion was that Li, as a general who had lost the campaign against Later Zhou, should not be in command. Li thus offered his resignation. In 957, Meng allowed him to retire from military duties. Empress Dowager Li, concerned that over the years, the military commands had not been in the hands of right generals, spoke to Meng:

I had previously watched Emperor Zhuangzong [(i.e., Li Cunxu)] battle Liang forces across the River, and also the acts of the late Emperor [(i.e., Meng Zhixiang)], both at Taiyuan and in conquering the Shu region. Under them, unless the generals had great accomplishments, they would not be allowed to command armies, so the soldiers became respectful and fearful. Among our current generals, Wang Zhaoyuan was originally a servant of ours; and Yi Shenzheng, Han Baozhen [(韓保貞)], and Zhao Chongtao [(趙崇韜, Zhao Tingyin's son)] are all young, inexperienced sons from aristocratic families. None of them had real military experience, and we are merely commissioning them because of their relationships with us. In ordinary times, no one would dare to object. But if there are troubles on the borders, how can they battle the great enemies? The way I see it, only Gao Yanchou is an old soldier from Taiyuan who would not abuse your trust. No other is suitable.

Meng did not listen to her, however.

Meanwhile, also in 957, apparently as a posture of goodwill, Guo sent several thousand Later Shu soldiers that he captured during the Qin/Feng campaign, whom he had previously made into a special Huai'en Army (懷恩軍) and put under command of the captured Later Shu officer Xiao Zhiyuan (蕭知遠), back to Later Shu. To reciprocate, Meng also some 80 Later Zhou officers captured in the campaign back to Later Zhou, and against wrote Guo, asking for friendly relations. However, Guo was again displeased with the letter's expression of equal status, and therefore again refused to respond. When Meng heard of this, he angrily stated, "When we became emperor and were offering sacrifices to heaven and earth, you were still a bandit. How dare you do this to us?"

In 958, there was a time when the low level advisory official Zhang Jiuling (章九齡) had the chance to meet Meng. He stated to Meng that the reason why the imperial governance was ineffective was because the government was controlled by wicked people. When Meng asked him who the wicked people were, he referred to Li Hao and Wang. Meng, in anger, stated that Zhang was falsely accusing senior officials, and had Zhang exiled to be a secretary to the prefect of Wei Prefecture (維州, in modern Ngawa Tibetan and Qiang Autonomous Prefecture, Sichuan).

Meanwhile, Gao Baorong, the ruler of Jingnan, who carried the title of Prince of Nanping as a vassal of Later Zhou, wrote Meng repeatedly, urging him to submit as a vassal to Later Zhou. With his campaign against Southern Tang over (concluding with Southern Tang's submission as a vassal and ceding of its territory north of the Yangtze River to Later Zhou), Guo was also making preparations for another campaign against Later Shu. Meng was concerned sufficiently that he submitted the matter to discussions by his senior officials. All of the senior generals argued that the Shu lands had natural defenses and swore that they were willing to die to defend the state. Meng thus had Li Hao write Gao back, rejecting the overture. Gao subsequently offered his services to Guo in attacking Later Shu. In preparation against the coming Later Zhou invasion, Meng had the generals Zhao Chongtao, his elder brother Meng Yiye (孟貽業), Zhao Sijin (趙思進), and Gao Yanchou take up defensive positions various passes into Shu lands. The invasion never came, though, as Guo fell ill and died in summer 959. Nevertheless, the Later Shu people were frightened about the prospects of the invasion. The junior official Xu Jifu (徐及甫), who was upset at his lack of promotions within the Later Shu government, thereafter tried to use this opportunity to plot a coup—planning to support Wang Jian's grandson Wang Lingyi (王令儀) as the coup leader. When it became clear that Later Zhou was not invading, however, the plot was leaked by its members. Xu committed suicide, and Meng ordered Wang to commit suicide. In the aftermaths of Guo's death, the Later Zhou general Zhao Kuangyin seized power in a coup, establishing Song dynasty as its Emperor Taizu.

In 962, Meng created his son Meng Xuanzhe crown prince.

Later in 962, Meng ordered a closer review of the tax rolls for the prefectures under Later Shu control, hoping to collect more revenues by stricter enforcement of the tax code. The county magistrate Si Chun (四淳) submitted a petition, arguing that stricter enforcement would merely put greater stress on the people and would damage the state, but Meng did not listen to him.

=== The fall of Later Shu ===
In 964, the Song emperor was planning to launch a major campaign to destroy Northern Han. However, after consulting with the general Zhang Hui (張暉), Zhang advocated against such a move, believing that Song's Zhaoyi Circuit (昭義, headquartered in modern Changzhi, Shanxi), on the border with Northern Han, had been so damaged by warfare that it would not serve as a good springboard for an invasion against Northern Han at that time. He thus made Zhang the military prefect (團練使, Tuanlianshi) of Feng Prefecture with orders for him to survey the geography of the region, to prepare an eventual invasion of Later Shu. Li Hao, suspecting that a Song invasion was soon coming and concerned that it would be difficult to stand against such an invasion, now advocated for Later Shu to submit to Song as a vassal. Wang Zhaoyuan strongly opposed, however, and so Meng Chang reacted by again ramping up defenses to prepare for invasion.

In 964, at Wang's suggestion, Meng wrote secret letters hidden in wax pills and tried to have three covert messengers deliver them to Liu Jun, suggesting simultaneous preemptive strikes on Song. However, once in Song territory, one of the messengers defected to Song and offered the contents of the letter he possessed to the Song emperor. The Song emperor happily stated, "I now have a justification for a campaign!" He pardoned the other two messengers as well, and had all three of them map out the Later Shu geography as well as locations of key garrisons, in preparation for the coming campaign. Shortly after, he launched 60,000 men to attack on two fronts, through Feng Prefecture on the north side of Later Shu (commanded by the general Wang Quanbin (王全斌)), and from Gui Prefecture (歸州, in modern Yichang, Hubei, formerly part of Jingnan's territory, which Song took directly under control in 963), on the east side of Later Shu, commanded by the general Liu Guangyi (劉光義).

Hearing of the coming Song invasion, Meng commissioned Wang Zhaoyuan to command the overall campaign of resistance. At the feast to send Wang off, Wang, who greatly inflated his own abilities, compared himself to the great Shu Han chancellor Zhuge Liang, and boasted that he would not only be able to resist the Song invasion but be able to conquer the Central Plains (i.e., Song proper). Assisting Wang on the campaign were Zhao Chongtao, Han Baozhen, and Li Jin (李進). Han and Li were quickly captured by the Song officer Li Yande (吏延德), and after that, the Later Shu forces under Wang lost battle after battle. Fearful that the Song forces would soon be descending on Chengdu, Meng dispatched another army with Meng Xuanzhe in titular command but with Li Tinggui and Zhang Hui'an (張惠安) in actual command, to set up defense position at Jianmen Pass. Before Meng Xuanzhe's army could reach Jianmen, however, Wang Quanbin's army bypassed Jianmen and to try to cut off Wang Zhaoyuan's path back to Chengdu. Wang Zhaoyuan tried to engage Wang Quanbin, but his army was defeated, and both he and Zhao were captured. Meng Xuanzhe took his army and fled back to Chengdu.

Hearing of Wang Zhaoyuan's and Zhao's capture, Meng Chang was panicking and initially could not decide what to do. He consulted the remaining senior officers. Shi Fengjun advocated defending Chengdu, believing that the Song army could not persist in a siege. Meng, however, rejected that idea, stating:

My father and I treated these officers well with plenteous clothing and good food for 40 years. But when they encountered the enemy, they could not even fire an arrow to the east. Even if I were to defend these walls, who would die for me?

At Li Hao's suggestion, he sealed the imperial treasury and begged the Song army to allow him to surrender, sending Yi Shenzheng to the front to submit his surrender petition. When Yi reached Wang Quanbin's army, Wang Quanbin accepted the petition, and sent the officer Kang Yanze (康延澤) to Chengdu to assure Meng of his safety. When Wang Quanbin reached Chengdu, Meng surrendered to him, ending Later Shu.

== After surrender to Song dynasty ==
At the time he surrendered, Meng Chang also sent his brother Meng Renzhi (孟仁贄) to the Song capital Kaifeng to express his humility and fear, including the language, "I considered myself to have too many sins, and therefore I fear and worry." The Song emperor responded in an edict to try to comfort him, "As you now seek better fortune, your prior offenses are forgiven. We will not go back on our own words. You should not worry." The edict did not refer to Meng Chang by name, to show a degree of respect to him, and also referred to Empress Dowager Li as "the Mother of the State" to also show similar respect to her.

In spring 965, Meng Chang and his family, as well as high level officials, began the trek to Kaifeng, down the Yangtze River to the east. Once they reached Jiangling, they were given special horses and wagons. When they reached Kaifeng, the Song emperor welcomed them in a grand ceremony and again reassured them that they were forgiven. He created Meng the Duke of Qin, and gave him the additional honorary titles of Kaifu Yitong Sansi (開府儀同三司), acting Taishi (太師), and Zhongshu Ling (中書令). However, Meng died a few days later. The Song emperor mourned him and bestowed the posthumous titles of Shangshu Ling (尚書令) and Prince of Chu on him. Upon Meng Chang's death, Empress Dowager Li did not weep, but stopped eating. She died after a few days as well.

== Personal information ==
- Father
  - Meng Zhixiang (Emperor Gaozu)
- Mother
  - Consort Li, later honored empress dowager
- Major Concubines
  - Consort Zhang Taihua (張太華)
  - Consort Xu, also known as Lady Huarui
- Children
  - Meng Xuanzhe (孟玄喆) (937–991), initially the Prince of Qin (created 950), later the Crown Prince (created 962), later Song dynasty official and general
  - Meng Xuanjue (孟玄珏), the Prince of Bao (created 950), later Song dynasty general (d. 992)
  - Meng Xuanbao (孟玄寶) (944–950), posthumously created the Prince of Sui
  - Princess Fengyi, wife of Li Shaolian (李少連), son of Li Hao
  - Princess Luanguo, wife of Wu Kegong (毋克恭), son of Wu Zhaoyi
  - Princess, wife of Han Chongsui (韓崇遂)
  - Princess, wife of Zhao Wenliang (趙文亮)
  - Princess, wife of Yi Chongdu (伊崇度)

== Sources ==
- Mote, F.W. (1999). Imperial China (900-1800). Harvard University Press. pp. 11, 15, 21. ISBN 0-674-01212-7.
- History of the Five Dynasties, vol. 136.
- New History of the Five Dynasties, vol. 64.
- History of Song, vol. 479.
- Zizhi Tongjian, vols. 275, 278, 279, 281, 282, 283, 286, 287, 288, 289, 290, 291, 292, 293, 294.
- Xu Zizhi Tongjian, vols. 2, 3, 4.
- Spring and Autumn Annals of the Ten Kingdoms, vol. 49.

Regnal titles
Preceded by Meng Zhixiang (Emperor Gaozu)	Emperor of Later Shu; 934–965	Succeeded by None (dynasty ended)
Preceded by Meng Zhixiang (Emperor Gaozu)	Emperor of China (Southwestern); 934–965	Succeeded by Emperor Taizu of Song
Preceded by Shi Chonggui of Later Jin	Emperor of China (Tianshui region); 947–955	Succeeded by Guo Rong of Later Zhou
