= Empress Dowager Li (Later Shu) =

Chinese Empress Dowager

Empress Dowager Li (李太后, personal name unknown; died 965) was the mother of Meng Chang, the last emperor of the Chinese Five Dynasties and Ten Kingdoms period state Later Shu. She was a concubine of Meng Chang's father Meng Zhixiang (Emperor Gaozu).

== Background ==
It is not known when the future Empress Dowager Li was born, but it is known that she was from Taiyuan. At one point, she became a concubine of Li Cunxu—the future founding emperor of Later Tang and, at that time, the heir to Li Keyong the Prince of Jin. Sometime later, she was awarded to the Jin official Meng Zhixiang as a concubine of his, possibly as an attendant to Li Keyong's daughter, whom Li Keyong gave in marriage to Meng as Meng's wife.

== As Meng Zhixiang's concubine ==
In 918 or 919, there was a time when Lady Li dreamed of a star falling into her abdomen. She informed this dream to Meng Zhixiang's wife (who would later, after Later Tang's founding in 923, be created the Grand Princess Qionghua), who believed this to be a favorable omen. The future princess thus had her attend to Meng. She gave birth to his third son Meng Renzan in late 919.

In 934, Meng Zhixiang, who then carried the title of Prince of Shu as a Later Tang subject, declared himself Emperor of Shu. With Grand Princess Qionghua having died by that point, he posthumously honored her as empress, and created Lady Li an imperial consort, initially with the rank of Furen (夫人), and then the greater title Guifei (貴妃).

== As empress dowager ==
Meng Zhixiang died in later 934, and Meng Renzan, who then changed his name to Meng Chang, took the throne. In 935, he honored Consort Li as empress dowager.

Empress Dowager Li was said to be intelligent and of good judgment. However, there were few references made to her being involved in Meng Chang's governance. The one exception was a reference in 957, when she became worried that the Later Shu military commands were in the hands of the wrong people. She stated to Meng Chang:

I had previously watched Emperor Zhuangzong [(i.e., Li Cunxu)] battle Liang forces across the River, and also the acts of the late Emperor [(i.e., Meng Zhixiang)], both at Taiyuan and in conquering the Shu region. Under them, unless the generals had great accomplishments, they would not be allowed to command armies, so the soldiers became respectful and fearful. Among our current generals, Wang Zhaoyuan was originally a servant of ours; and Yi Shenzheng [(伊審徵)], Han Baozhen [(韓保貞)], and Zhao Chongtao [(趙崇韜)] are all young, inexperienced sons from aristocratic families. None of them had real military experience, and we are merely commissioning them because of their relationships with us. In ordinary times, no one would dare to object. But if there are troubles on the borders, how can they battle the great enemies? The way I see it, only Gao Yanchou [(高彥儔)] is an old soldier from Taiyuan who would not abuse your trust. No other is suitable.

Meng Chang did not listen to her, however.

== After Later Shu's fall ==
In 964, the Song dynasty conquered Later Shu. Meng Chang, who surrendered to the Song forces, was taken to the Song capital Kaifeng, as was Empress Dowager Li. After they arrived in Kaifeng in 965, Song's Emperor Taizu treated them with respect, and referred to Empress Dowager Li as "mother of the State." He said to her, "Mother of the State, please treat yourself well and do not worry. If you missed your home land, I will find a day to have you escorted back there." Empress Dowager Li pointed out that she was from Taiyuan and wanted to retire there. As Taiyuan was then under the control of Song's rival state Northern Han, which Emperor Taizu was planning to conquer, Emperor Taizu viewed her remarks as good omen and was very pleased, informing her that he would allow her to do so as soon as he conquered Northern Han. He also greatly rewarded her with wealth.

However, Meng Chang died a few days after arriving at Kaifeng. Empress Dowager Li did not weep for him, but instead poured wine on the ground, stating:

You could not die for the state, and sought to live until now. The reason why I endured and did not die was you. Now you are dead. Why should I live on?

She stopped eating, and died several days later. Emperor Taizu was saddened by her death, and had both Meng Chang and her buried at Luoyang in a grand ceremony.

== Notes and references ==
- New History of the Five Dynasties, vol. 64.
- History of Song, vol. 479.
- Zizhi Tongjian, vols. 279, 293.
- Continuation to the Zizhi Tongjian, vol. 4.
- Spring and Autumn Annals of the Ten Kingdoms, vol. 50.
