= Wang Zhaoyuan (scholar) =

Chinese Confucian scholar and writer

Wang Zhaoyuan (王照圓; Shandong, 4 October 1763 – 1851) was a Chinese female Confucian scholar and writer. Unusually for a woman scholar, she was distinguished by her philological scholarship, not poetry. Her main work consists of annotations to Liu Xiang's (79-8 BCE) Biographies of Exemplary Women (Lienü Zhuan) and the Lives of the Taoist Transcendents (Liexian Zhuan). She also shared Liu Xiang's interest in the interpretation of dreams.

== Works ==
- Annotations to Liu Hsiang's Liexian Zhuan
- Annotations to Liu Hsiang's Lienü Zhuan
- Book of Dreams (梦书 Meng Shu)
