= Meng Zhixiang =

Emperor of Later Shu in 934

Emperor Gaozu of Later Shu 後蜀高祖

1st Emperor of Later Shu
- Reign: 16 March 934 – 7 September 934
- Successor: Meng Chang

Prince of Shu (蜀王)
- Reign: 933 – 934

jiedushi of Xichuan Circuit (西川節度使)
- Tenure: 925 – 934
- Born: 10 May 874
- Died: 7 September 934 (aged 60)
- Burial: He Mausoleum (和陵; in modern Chengdu); 30°44′28″N 104°07′11″E
Full name
- Family name: Mèng (孟); Given name: Zhīxiáng (知祥)
Era name and dates
- Míngdé (明德): 27 May 934 – 2 February 938
Posthumous name
- Emperor Wénwǔ Shèngdé Yīngliè Míngxiào (文武聖德英烈明孝皇帝)
Temple name
- Gāozǔ (高祖)
- House: Meng
- Dynasty: Later Shu

Meng Zhixiang (Chinese: 孟知祥; 10 May 874–7 September 934), courtesy name Baoyin (保胤), also known by his temple name as the Emperor Gaozu of Later Shu (後蜀高祖), was the founding emperor of the Chinese Later Shu dynasty during the Five Dynasties and Ten Kingdoms period.

Meng Zhixiang was originally a general and an in-law of the Later Tang dynasty's ruling family, who went by the family name Li. Meng married the eldest sister or perhaps a cousin of the Emperor Zhuangzong of Later Tang. Meng served the Later Tang as the military governor (Jiedushi) of Xichuan Circuit (西川, headquartered in modern Chengdu, Sichuan), after the conquest of Former Shu. After Emperor Zhuangzong's death, Meng was more distant to the succeeding emperor. The new emperor was Emperor Zhuangzong's adoptive brother, Emperor Mingzong. Meng, fearing accusations by Emperor Mingzong's chief advisor An Chonghui, rebelled, in alliance with Dong Zhang, military governor of neighboring Dongchuan Circuit (東川, headquartered in modern Mianyang, Sichuan). The Meng-Dong alliance repelled subsequent attempts to suppress or control them, although they continued as nominal subjects of Mingzong. Eventually, Meng overpowered Dong, thus assuming control of both allied domains. Meng continued as titular vassal to Mingzong for the rest of that emperor's reign; but, afterwards, Meng Zhixiang declared himself emperor, thereby founding the Later Shu dynasty.

== Birth, family, and early career ==
=== Birth ===
Meng Zhixiang was born in 874, during the reign of Emperor Yizong of Tang.

=== Family ===
His family was from Xing Prefecture (邢州, in modern Xingtai, Hebei), and his ancestors had served for generations as army officers at Xing, including his grandfather Meng Cha (孟察) and his father Meng Dao (孟道). His uncle Meng Fangli become military governor (Jiedushi) of Zhaoyi Circuit (昭義, headquartered then in Changzhi, Shanxi), which Xing Prefecture belonged to, late in the Tang dynasty, and later moved the circuit's capital from Lu Prefecture (潞州) to Xing in 882, precipitating a mutiny that led to the division of the circuit in two in 883. After Meng Fangli's subsequent suicide in 889, he was succeeded by his younger brother (Meng Zhixiang's uncle) Meng Qian (孟遷), who subsequently surrendered the parts of Zhaoyi he controlled to the major warlord Li Keyong the military governor of Hedong Circuit (河東, headquartered in modern Taiyuan, Shanxi) in 890.

=== Early career ===
Li later put Meng Qian back in command of (reunified) Zhaoyi Circuit in 899. However, when Zhaoyi came under attack in 901 by Li's archrival Zhu Quanzhong the military governor of Xuanwu Circuit (宣武, headquartered in modern Kaifeng, Henan), Meng Qian surrendered the circuit to Zhu. Meng Zhixiang's father Meng Dao continued to serve Li, but did not distinguish himself in the Hedong army. Li, however, was impressed with Meng Zhixiang's talent, and eventually gave his eldest daughter to Meng Zhixiang in marriage. (Meng Zhixiang's younger sister later married another younger brother of Li Keyong's, Li Kening.) Meng Zhixiang thereafter became a training officer in the Hedong army.

== Political background during Jin ==
In 907, Zhu Quanzhong had Tang's final emperor Emperor Ai yield the throne to him, ending Tang and starting a new Later Liang with him as its Emperor Taizu. Li Keyong and several other regional governors (Yang Wo the military governor of Huainan Circuit (淮南, headquartered in modern Yangzhou, Jiangsu), Li Maozhen the military governor of Fengxiang Circuit (鳳翔, headquartered in modern Baoji, Shaanxi), and Wang Jian the military governor of Xichuan Circuit) refused to recognize the new Later Liang emperor, with Li Keyong, Li Maozhen, and Yang continuing to maintain the Tang era name of Tianyou, while Wang shortly after declared himself the emperor of a new state of Former Shu, although Li Keyong was effectively the ruler of his own state of Jin as he carried the title of Prince of Jin. In 908, Li Keyong died and was succeeded as the Prince of Jin by his son Li Cunxu.

=== Career as training officer ===
Meng Zhixiang continued to serve as training officer. Meanwhile, there was an incident in or around 912, when Li Cunxu, angry that the recently surrendered official Li Yan (李嚴) refused his request for Li Yan to serve as teacher to his son Li Jiji, was considering executing Li Yan. It was at Meng's intercession (pointing out that executing Li Yan would speak poorly for Li Cunxu's reputation) that Li Yan was spared.

=== Promotion ===
In or around 919, Li Cunxu wanted to make Meng Zhixiang chief of staff (中門使, Zhongmenshi) of the recently captured Tianxiong Circuit (天雄, headquartered in modern Handan, Hebei). However, as that position was a thankless position, and several prior chiefs of staff had been executed due to accusations of wrongdoing, Meng was fearful and declined the position. When Li Cunxu asked him for an alternative recommendation, he recommended the officer Guo Chongtao, whom Li Cunxu subsequently made chief of staff. Because of this recommendation, Guo, whose career would be greatly bolstered by this commission, became thankful to Meng later. Meng himself was thereafter made the discipline officer at Hedong. At one point, Li Cunxu awarded one of his own concubines, a Lady Li, to Meng Zhixiang, and she gave birth to Meng Zhixiang's third son Meng Renzan, in 919.

== During Later Tang ==
=== During Emperor Zhuangzong's reign ===
In 923, Li Cunxu declared himself the emperor of a new state of Later Tang (as Emperor Zhuangzong) at Xingtang (興唐, i.e., Weibo's capital). He designated Taiyuan as the western capital and made Meng Zhixiang its mayor, as well as its deputy defender. (Meng's wife, as the new emperor's eldest sister, was created the Grand Princess Qionghua, either at that time or in 925.) Shortly after, Emperor Zhuangzong destroyed rival Later Liang and took over its territory, setting his capital at Luoyang.

In 925, Emperor Zhuangzong was planning to launch a major campaign to destroy Former Shu. He commissioned Li Jiji as the titular commander as its operations, with Guo Chongtao serving as deputy commander, in actual command of the operations. Before departing Luoyang, Guo, still thankful to Meng for having recommended him initially, recommended Meng as the prospective military commander of Xichuan if the campaign would be successful in conquering Former Shu. Later in the year, after Li Jiji and Guo were successful in capturing Former Shu's capital Chengdu and its emperor Wang Zongyan (Wang Jian's son and successor), thus destroying it, Emperor Zhuangzong summoned Meng to Luoyang and made him the military governor of Xichuan, also bestowing on him the honorary chancellor designation of Tong Zhongshu Menxia Pingzhangshi (同中書門下平章事), preparing him to send him to Xichuan.

By this point, though, friction had begun to surface between Emperor Zhuangzong and the once highly trusted Guo. Emperor Zhuangzong and his wife Empress Liu were suspicious that Guo had seized the wealth of the Former Shu state and not submitted most of it to the imperial treasury. There were also rumors that Guo would rebel and seize the Shu territory for himself. Thus, when sending Meng on its way, Emperor Zhuangzong commented, "I have heard that Guo Chongtao may have treasonous wishes. When you get there, Lord, execute him for me." Meng responded, "Guo Chongtao is an accomplished old subject of the Empire, and it is not likely that he has such wishes. When I, your subject, reaches Shu, I will examine him. If he has no such wishes, I will send him back." Emperor Zhuangzong, at that time, agreed.

However, Empress Liu became convinced that Guo was about to rebel and would kill her son Li Jiji first. She was unable to persuade Emperor Zhuangzong of this, however, and she decided to issue an edict on her own, to be delivered by her servant eunuch Ma Yangui (馬彥珪) to Li Jiji, ordering Guo's death. When Ma caught up with Meng, he delivered the message to Meng, and then himself rushed toward Chengdu. Meng knew that disaster was about to come, and therefore decided to speed himself to Chengdu as well, behind Ma. Ma arrived in Chengdu shortly after, in spring 926. Li Jiji initially hesitated after receiving Empress Liu's edict, but then carried it out by summoning Guo to him and then killing him and his sons in surprise. This led to a general state of confusion in Chengdu, but Meng arrived shortly after and comforted both the army and the people in the city. Shortly after, Li Jiji left Meng in command of the city, departing it and heading back toward Luoyang with his troops.

The nearly simultaneous killing of both Guo and another major general, Zhu Youqian, however, shocked both the armies around the empire at large and the people, and almost immediately caused a number of mutinies to rise around the empire. One of those mutinies was led by one of the generals who served under Guo during the Former Shu campaign, Li Shaochen (né Kang Yanxiao) and whose soldiers were largely previously under Zhu, and therefore who wanted to avenge Zhu. Li Shaochen claimed the title of military governor of Xichuan and postured to attack Chengdu. However, he was quickly defeated in a joint operation commanded by Meng, Dong Zhang the military governor of Dongchuan Circuit, and Ren Huan. After Li Shaochen's defeat, Li Jiji, who had stopped his progress east pending the result of the campaign, continued east back toward Luoyang. Despite Li Shaochen's defeat, however, there were still many disturbances and much banditry in the Shu territory. It was said that Meng comforted the people by selecting honest officials and decreasing the tax burden, causing the people to begin to acquiesce to his control.

Before Li Jiji could reach Luoyang, however, the mutinies multiplied, and in summer 926, Emperor Zhuangzong himself was killed in a mutiny at the capital Luoyang itself. The commander of one of the mutinies, Emperor Zhuangzong's adoptive brother Li Siyuan (and therefore adoptive brother to Meng's wife Grand Princess Qionghua), quickly reached Luoyang itself and claimed the title of regent. Li Jiji postured to challenge him, but soon discovered that his own soldiers were abandoning him in droves. Finding the situation hopeless, Li Jiji committed suicide, and Li Siyuan claimed the title of emperor shortly after (as Emperor Mingzong).

=== During Emperor Mingzong's reign ===
==== Initial establishment in Xichuan ====
Emperor Mingzong appeared to immediately try to make an attempt to reaffirm Meng Zhixiang's faith to his newly established administration, by bestowing on Meng the greater honorary chancellor title of Shizhong (侍中). However, Meng was said to begin to plan to take personal control of the region, by establishing, in addition to the 26 corps that Guo Chongtao left in Xichuan, which totaled 27,000 soldiers, some 36 additional corps of troops, totaling 32,000 soldiers, including six special naval corps preparing to defend against attacks from water.

Meanwhile, Ren Huan became a chancellor and was also in charge of the three finance bureaus (taxation, treasury, and salt and iron monopolies), and, believing that Xichuan was wealthy and capable of supporting the central government financially, sent Meng's old friend Zhao Jiliang to Xichuan to prepare to transported the wealth previously stored by the Former Shu regime, as well as taxes collected since then, to Luoyang. When Zhao arrived at Chengdu in winter 926, Meng's staff members initially advised him to refuse the orders completely, but Meng chose to partially comply — allowing Zhao to have the stored wealth shipped to Luoyang, but refusing to turn over any further tax revenues. He also kept Zhao at Chengdu to serve as his deputy military governor.

By this point, Emperor Mingzong's chief of staff An Chonghui had begun to suspect both Meng (as his wife was Emperor Zhuangzong's eldest sister) and Dong Zhang (who was one of Emperor Zhuangzong's favorite generals) of planning to separate their territory from Later Tang proper. Li Yan (whose life Meng had previously saved by interceding with Emperor Zhuangzong), who had previously served as Later Tang's emissary to Former Shu and had been a major proponent of the campaign against Former Shu, volunteered to serve as the monitor to the Xichuan army, believing that he could curb Meng's ambitions, so An had Li commissioned as the monitor to the Xichuan army, while commissioning the officer Zhu Hongzhao as the deputy military governor of Dongchuan, hoping that they could curb the powers of Meng and Dong, respectively.

Meng was very displeased with Li's commissioning, and while ostensibly welcoming Li, he sent a large number of soldiers to escort Li to Chengdu, hoping that the large display of military might would intimidate Li into leaving on his own. Li took no heed of this, however, and proceeded to Chengdu. Once Li arrived at Chengdu, Meng initially outwardly treated him with respect, but in spring 927, after publicly rebuking him for advocating the campaign against Former Shu that led to the destruction of both Former Shu and Later Tang — i.e., the destruction of Emperor Zhuangzong's administration — executed him. Hearing of Li's death, Zhu fled back to Luoyang, fearing the same fate. Meng then submitted a report to Emperor Mingzong, claiming that Li had plotted to take over the army and had falsely claimed that Meng would soon be summoned back to Luoyang to undermine Meng.

During this time, Meng had sent his attendants to escort his wife Grand Princess Qionghua, as well as Meng Renzan (and probably Meng Renzan's mother Lady Li) to Xichuan. When they reached Fengxiang, the news of Li Yan's death had also reached Fengxiang, and the military governor of Fengxiang, Li Congyan (Li Maozhen's son and successor, who was allowed to inherit the circuit after Li Maozhen submitted to be a Later Tang vassal) immediately had them detained at Fengxiang. However, wanting to retain Meng's faithfulness by grace, Emperor Mingzong ordered that they be allowed to continue on to Chengdu, escorted by the official Li Renju (李仁矩).

Meanwhile, Meng and Dong were also disputing themselves, over the profitability of the salt mines that both of their circuits controlled. To try to gain a trade advantage on Meng, Dong reduced the prices of Dongchuan salt, thus inducing merchants to go to Dongchuan, buy salt, and selling it on the Xichuan salt markets, thus depressing the price of Xichuan salt. In 928, Meng reacted by establishing taxation checkpoints on the border of Xichuan and Dongchuan and taxing such salt trade heavily. With their profits taken away by these taxes, merchants no longer went to Dongchuan to buy salt.

Around that time, Emperor Mingzong had ordered that Xichuan contribute troops in a campaign against the rebel warlord Gao Jixing the military governor of Jingnan Circuit (荊南, headquartered in modern Jingzhou, Hubei), to take back three prefectures that Emperor Zhuangzong had previously bestowed Gao (Kui (夔州), Wan (萬州), and Zhong (忠州), all in modern Chongqing). Meng sent 3,000 troops, commanded by the officer Mao Chongwei (毛重威). After Later Tang imperial forces were able to recapture those prefectures from Gao, however, Meng requested that the troops be returned; Emperor Mingzong refused. Meng then sent secret messengers to Mao and induced him to, in violation of imperial orders, return to Chengdu with his troops. Mao did so, and when Emperor Mingzong subsequently ordered that Mao be punished, Meng refused. Further, Meng also started to refuse to comply with past orders to supply the central government-created Ningjiang Circuit (寧江, headquartered at Kui Prefecture) with food, claiming that the food was necessary for his own circuit's army.

==== Joint campaign of resistance against Later Tang with Dong Zhang ====
Meanwhile, the Later Tang imperial government, under An Chonghui's strategy, was placing key posts in the region under its own control — with Xia Luqi (夏魯奇), who had been the deputy commander of the operations against Jingnan, made the military governor of Wuxin Circuit (武信, headquartered in modern Suining, Sichuan), Li Renju made the military governor of a new Baoning Circuit (保寧, headquartered in modern Langzhong, Sichuan), carved out of Dongchuan and Xichuan's neighboring Shannan West Circuit (山南西道, headquartered in modern Hanzhong, Shaanxi), and An's brother-in-law Wu Qianyu (武虔裕) the prefect of Mian Prefecture (綿州, in modern Mianyang), in the heart of Dongchuan itself. (Meng had effectively taken control of Wuxin earlier when Li Shaowen (李紹文) the military governor of Wuxin died in 927 and the imperial government abided by Meng's wishes by having Meng's officer Li Jingzhou (李敬周) made the acting military governor of Wuxin.) Further, there were rumors that An was ready to have Mian and nearby Long Prefecture (龍州, also in modern Mianyang) carved out of Dongchuan as a separate circuit.

These developments made both Meng Zhixiang and Dong Zhang apprehensive of the imperial government's attentions, and despite their prior animosity with each other, they began to negotiate an alliance, agreeing to have Dong's son marrying Meng's daughter; they also began to plan a joint resistance in case of an imperial operation against them. They then submitted a joint petition expressing their apprehension and objecting to the imperial establishment of these garrisons, to no avail. (Dong subsequently neutralized Wu by tricking him to Dongchuan's capital Zi Prefecture (梓州) and putting him under arrest, while the imperial government bestowed the greater honorary chancellor title of Zhongshu Ling (中書令) on Meng.)

Dong made one last-ditch attempt to stop the imperial government from what he and Meng saw as provocative deployments — by having his son Dong Guangye (董光業), who served as the director of imperial gardens at the capital Luoyang, inform An's deputy Li Qianhui (李虔徽) that if the imperial government sent more soldiers into the region, he would rebel. (However, as noted by, inter alia, the modern historian Bo Yang, Dong's threat had the exact opposite effect, since An's intent was to force Dong and Meng into rebellion so that he could destroy them.) When An thereafter, in fall 930, sent the officer Xun Xian'ai (荀咸乂) to reinforce Baoning's capital Lang Prefecture (閬州), Dong publicly declared his rebellion, and he and Meng joined their forces to prepare to attack Baoning, Wuxin, and Zhaowu (昭武, headquartered in modern Guangyuan, Sichuan) Circuits, which were loyal to the imperial government. Their plan (as proposed by Zhao Jiliang) was to quickly capture Baoning and Wuxin, and then defend the treacherous Jianmen Pass to stop the imperial army from advancing.

Emperor Mingzong reacted by commissioning his son-in-law Shi Jingtang the military governor of Tianxiong as the commander of an army against Dongchuan and Xichuan (with Xia as his deputy), stripping Dong Zhang and Meng of all of their titles, and slaughtering Dong Guangye and his family. Long before Shi's army could arrive in the region, however, the joint Dongchuan/Xichuan forces, under Dong Zhang's command, quickly captured Lang Prefecture and killed Li Renju, while a Xichuan army commanded by Li Renhan, with Zhao Tingyin as Li Renhan's deputy, put Xia under siege at Wuxin's capital Sui Prefecture (遂州). However, Dong, believing that Jianmen Pass was securely defended by his own Dongchuan army, turned down Meng's offer of reinforcements; rather, he headed for Zhaowu's capital Li Prefecture (利州) and tried to capture it; when inclement weather subsequently stopped his advance, he withdrew back to Lang Prefecture without reinforcing the Jianmen defense.

Dong's failure to adequately guard Jianmen led to the only crisis for Meng and Dong in their campaign against the imperial forces. In winter 930, the imperial officer Wang Hongzhi (王弘贄) bypassed Jianmen Pass and then circled around to attack it by surprise. Jianmen fell to him, and he then captured nearby Jian Prefecture (劍州, in modern Guangyuan), shocking both Dong and Meng. However, no imperial forces reinforced Wang, who thereafter felt compelled to abandon Jian Prefecture and simply guard Jianmen. Xichuan forces under Zhao Tingyin and Li Zhao (李肇) subsequently were able to take Jian Prefecture and defend it, alleviating the situation. Meanwhile, Meng also sent the former Former Shu general Zhang Wu (張武) to capture the imperially-held Wutai Circuit (武泰, headquartered in modern Chongqing).

By this time, Emperor Mingzong's resolve to defeat Dongchuan and Xichuan was beginning to dissolve, as he no longer fully trusted An's judgment or loyalty. He was particularly worried about the western circuits' reports of their difficulty in supplying Shi's army. An volunteered to head to the front to oversee the operations himself. However, as soon as he left Luoyang, Shi, who did not agree with this operation, submitted petitions requesting an end to the operations. Apparently as a test to see whether Meng would be willing to end his resistance, Emperor Mingzong released some 1,500 men that Xichuan had previously sent to Kui Prefecture back to Xichuan. In spring 931, Meng submitted a petition thanking Emperor Mingzong for their release, but did not stop his own military operations, as soon thereafter, Li Renhan captured Sui Prefecture, and Xia committed suicide. Meng, after showing Xia's head to the imperial army to demonstrate that Sui Prefecture had fallen, buried Xia with respect.

By this point, An was almost at the front, but after he visited Fengxiang on the way, then governed by Zhu Hongzhao, Zhu submitted a secret petition falsely accusing An of being resentful to the emperor and possibly ready to seize the command of the imperial army from Shi, and also wrote Shi expressing the same. Shi, in fear, submitted petitions requesting that An be recalled. Emperor Mingzong thus recalled An. As soon as he did so, Shi, without first requesting approval from the emperor, withdrew his army from the Jianmen front and headed back toward Luoyang. When Dongchuan and Xichuan forces subsequently chased Shi's army and reached Li Prefecture, Li Yanqi (李彥琦) the military governor of Zhaowu abandoned it and fled as well. Meng made Zhao Tingyin the acting military governor. Zhao Tingyin subsequently advocated seizing Dong by trick and taking over his army, but Meng stopped him from doing so. After Li Renhan captured Wuxin, Meng sent him further east to attack Ningjiang. An Chongruan (安崇阮) the military governor of Ningjiang abandoned Kui Prefecture as well, allowing Li Renhan to capture Ningjiang. When Zhao Tingyin subsequently advocated further attacking Shannan West Circuit, however, Meng, pointing out that the army was tired, refused.

Meanwhile, even before An Chonghui reached Luoyang, Emperor Mingzong commissioned him the military governor of Huguo Circuit (護國, headquartered in modern Yuncheng, Shanxi), and shortly after, after An offered to retire, initially granted the request to retire, but then sent his nephew Li Congzhang (李從璋) the Prince of Yang to kill An. After An's death, Emperor Mingzong blamed the imperial conflicts with Dong, Meng, and Qian Liu the King of Wuyue on An, and in essence capitulated by sending the Xichuan official Su Yuan (蘇愿) and the Dongchuan officer Liu Cheng (劉澄), who had been trapped at Luoyang, back to their circuits to announce An's death and the imperial government's desire for peace. (Other than minor skirmishes, this effectively ended the imperial campaign against Dongchuan and Xichuan.)

==== Aftermaths of campaign against Later Tang ====
After Su Yuan arrived in Chengdu in winter 931, delivering Emperor Mingzong's message and further assuring Meng that his nephews who remained in imperial territory were safe, Meng wanted to resubmit to the imperial government, and tried to persuade Dong Zhang to do so as well. Dong refused in anger, pointing out that his family members had been executed; thereafter, he began to be hostile toward Meng again. Meng, not wanting to be seen as the breaker of the covenant between him and Dong, did not himself send emissaries to the imperial government initially, and tried two more times to persuade Dong, to no avail. On the last of those occasions in spring 932, Meng's emissary Li Hao, after returning to Chengdu, pointed out that it appeared that Dong was planning an attack and that Xichuan should be prepared. (Around this time, Meng's wife Grand Princess Fuqing (her title's having been changed to Fuqing by Emperor Mingzong) died.)

In summer 932, Dong launched his attack, and initially the Dongchuan army, with Dong being known as a fierce fighter, had a number of victory over Xichuan forces. As part of Dong's plan to adversely affect the Xichuan morale, he wrote letters to Zhao Jiliang, Zhao Tingyin, and Li Zhao, acting as if they were acting in concert with him. Meng paid no heed to those letters, and, leaving Zhao Jiliang in command at Chengdu, himself took an army, along with Zhao Tingyin, to engage Dong. Meanwhile, Dong, after capturing Xichuan's Han Prefecture (漢州, in modern Deyang, Sichuan), approached Chengdu. Meng's and Zhao Tingyin's forces engaged him, but initially the Dongchuan forces prevailed; however, when Xichuan forces that Zhao Tingyin put in reserve then engaged Dongchuan forces, the Dongchuan forces were crushed, and Dong fled back to Zi Prefecture. Once he got there, his officers Wang Hui (王暉) and Dong Yanhao (董延浩) (a son to one of his cousins) mutinied. In the mutiny, another officer, Pan Chou (潘稠) killed Dong Zhang and offered his head to Wang. Wang thereafter surrendered the city to Meng.

Meng thereafter faced the situation that both Zhao Tingyin and Li Renhan wanted command of Dongchuan — a conflict that threatened to tear the victorious Xichuan forces apart. Meng, to resolve the situation, took command of Dongchuan himself, while returning Li to Wuxin and giving Zhao the command of Baoning. By this point, Meng had effective control of not only the two original circuits of Xichuan and Dongchuan, but the carved-out circuits of Wuxin, Baoning, Zhaowu, Ningjiang, and Wutai as well. However, he rejected an overture from his subordinates, led by Zhao Jiliang, to declare himself a prince.

When the imperial government initially received reports of conflict between Dong and Meng, it hoped to take advantage of the situation, but after Meng quickly defeated Dong, An Chonghui's successor as chief of staff, Fan Yanguang, pointed out to Emperor Mingzong that even though Meng controlled the region, he still needed imperial sanction because his soldiers were largely from the Central Plains. Emperor Mingzong, still outwardly treating Meng as an old friend, thus sent his attendant Li Cungui (李存瓌) — a son of Li Kening's and therefore a nephew of Meng's — to Chengdu, reassuring Meng of his family members' and friends' safety and urging him to return to the imperial fold. After Li Cungui reached Chengdu, Meng, taking the form of a subject, knelt and accepted the imperial edict. Thereafter, he became formally a vassal of Later Tang again, but was said to be even more arrogant toward the imperial government than before. He also reported the death of Grand Princess Fuqing, whom Emperor Mingzong then posthumously honored as Grand Princess Yongshun of Jin.

Shortly thereafter, Meng had Li Hao draft petitions on the part of the five acting military governors of the five subsidiary circuits, asking that Meng be given acting imperial authority in the region and asking for imperially-issued staffs for their own commands. Li Hao pointed out that this is the authority that Meng himself should be asking for, lest that he be viewed as needing the sanctioning from his subordinates. Under Li Hao's suggestion, Meng therefore submitted a petition of his own, requesting authority to commission prefectural prefects and lower-level officials on his own, while requesting that the imperial government officially command the five acting military governors as military governors. He also requested that the imperial government send the wives and children of the soldiers from the Central Plains to allow the families to be reunited. In winter 932, Emperor Mingzong again sent Li Cungui to Chengdu to deliver his edict, largely approving Meng's requests, and further giving him the authority to commission even military governors in the region. However, he refused to send the wives and children of the soldiers to the region, but also did not (as Meng had feared that he might) order that they be returned to the imperial government. Shortly after, Meng, under authorities granted by Emperor Mingzong, formally bestowed the five acting military governors full commands.

In spring 933, Emperor Mingzong further formally created Meng the Prince of Shu and made him the military governor of both Dongchuan and Xichuan, sending the high-level officials Lu Wenji and Lü Qi for the creation ceremony. Meng himself crafted clothes and crowns that were like the emperor's.

Later that year, Emperor Mingzong died and was succeeded by his son Li Conghou the Prince of Song (as Emperor Min). When Meng received the news, he commented:

The Prince of Song is young and weak, and those who govern for him were people like imperial servants. They would surely create disturbances throughout the realm.

Thereafter, his subordinates persuaded him to take the throne himself, and, in spring 934, he did so, claiming himself to be the Emperor of Shu.

== As emperor of independent Later Shu state ==
Shortly after Meng Zhixiang claimed the Later Shu throne, the Later Tang imperial succession was thrown into turmoil when Emperor Min's chiefs of staff, Zhu Hongzhao and Feng Yun, who suspected both Shi Jingtang and Emperor Min's adoptive brother Li Congke the Prince of Lu, tried to move their commands — Shi from Hedong to Chengde (成德, headquartered in modern Shijiazhuang, Shanxi) and Li Congke from Fengxiang to Hedong. Li Congke, fearing that this move was intended to trick him to his death, rebelled; he subsequently defeated the imperial forces sent against him and advanced toward Luoyang, eventually killing Emperor Min and taking the throne himself. As he was doing so, Zhang Qianzhao (張虔釗) the military governor of Shannan West and Sun Hanshao (孫漢韶) the military governor of Wuding Circuit (武定, headquartered in modern Hanzhong), who had been part of the imperial forces against him and who feared reprisals, surrendered their circuits to Later Shu, allowing Later Shu to take the region south of the Qinling Mountains.

Meanwhile, Meng, who was said to have suffered from a stroke for over a year, became gravely ill. In fall 934, he created Meng Renzan Crown Prince. He died the same day, and Meng Renzan (whose name was then changed to Meng Chang) took the throne.

== Personal information ==
- Father
  - Meng Dao (孟道), posthumously honored Emperor Xiaowu with the temple name Xianzong (honored 934)
- Wife
  - Lady Li (died 932), eldest daughter of Li Keyong the Prince of Jin, later Grand Princess Qionghua (created 923?/925?) and then Grand Princess Fuqing (created 930) during Later Tang, posthumously honored as Grand Princess Yongshun of Jin by Li Siyuan, posthumously honored as empress by Meng Zhixiang (honored 934)
- Major Concubine
  - Consort Li (died 965), originally consort to Emperor Zhuangzong of Later Tang, mother of Prince Chang
- Children
  - Meng Yifan (孟貽範), died young before 932
  - Meng Yiyong (孟貽邕), died young before 932
  - Meng Yiju (孟貽矩), presumably predeceased him
  - Meng Yiye (孟貽鄴), the Prince of Yan, died later than 958
  - Meng Chang (孟昶) (919–965), né Meng Renzan (孟仁贊), the Crown Prince (created 934), later emperor
  - Meng Renyi (孟仁毅) (died 955), the Prince Gongxiao of Kui (created 950)
  - Meng Renyu (孟仁裕) (928–970), the Prince of Peng (created 950)
  - Meng Renzhi (孟仁贄) (927–971), the Prince of Ya (created 950), later the Earl of Pingchang during the Song dynasty
  - Meng Rencao (孟仁操) (died 986), the Prince of Jia (created 950)
  - Meng Jiuzhu (孟久柱), Princess Chonghua, wife of Yi Yangui (伊延瓌)
  - Meng Yanyi (孟延意), Princess Yuqing, wife of Dong Guangsi (董光嗣) son of Dong Zhang
  - Princess Jinxian, wife of Zhang Kuangbi (張匡弼) eldest son of Zhang Qianzhao
  - Princess Lanying, wife of Sun Yancong (孫晏琮) son of Sun Hanshao

Regnal titles
Preceded by None (dynasty founded)	Emperor of Later Shu; 934	Succeeded by Meng Chang
Preceded by Li Conghou (Emperor Min of Later Tang)	Emperor of China (Southwestern); 934	Succeeded by Meng Chang
