= Later Shu =

Chinese kingdom from 934 to 965; part of the 5 Dynasties and 10 Kingdoms period

Shu 蜀
- 934–965
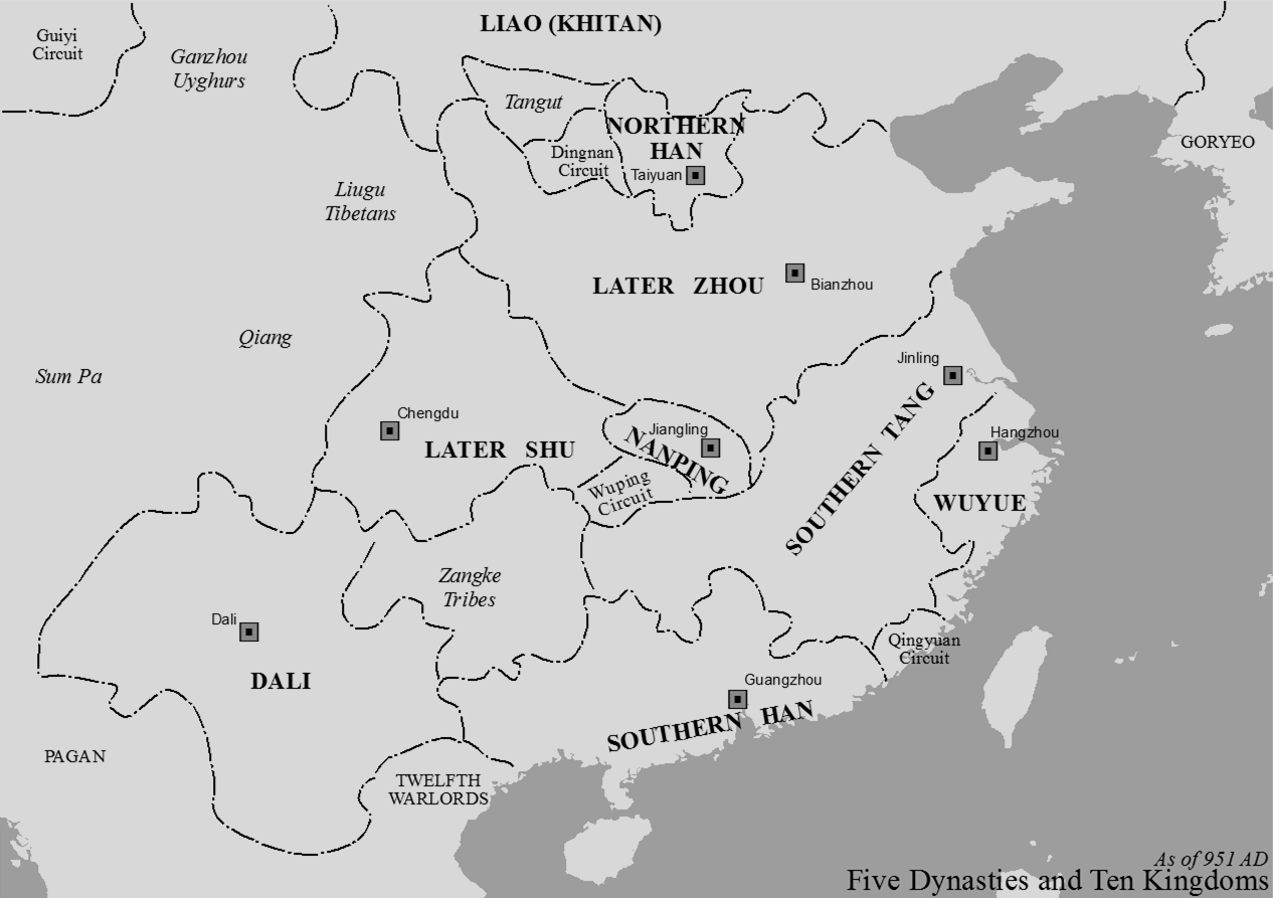
- Later Shu shown in light red
- Capital: Chengdu
- Common languages: Ba–Shu Chinese
- Government: Monarchy
- Emperor
  - 934: Emperor Gaozu
  - 934–965: Emperor Houzhu
- Historical era: Five Dynasties and Ten Kingdoms period
  - Established in Chengdu: 934
  - Surrendered to Song: 965
| Preceded by | Succeeded by |
| Later Tang | Song dynasty |
- Today part of: China

Shu, referred to as Later Shu (traditional Chinese: 後蜀; simplified Chinese: 后蜀; pinyin: Hòu Shǔ) and Meng Shu (Chinese: 孟蜀) in historiography, was a dynastic state of China and one of the Ten Kingdoms during the Five Dynasties and Ten Kingdoms period. It was located in present-day Sichuan with its capital in Chengdu and lasted from 934 to 965.

== Rulers ==
| Temple name | Posthumous name | Family name and given name | Reign | Era names and their corresponding years |
|---|---|---|---|---|
| 高祖 (Gaozu) | Emperor Wénwǔ Shèngdé Yīngliè Míngxiào (文武聖德英烈明孝皇帝) | Mèng Zhīxíang (孟知祥) | 934 | Míngdé (明德) 934 |
| 後主 (Houzhu) | Prince Gongxiao of Chu (楚恭孝王) | Mèng Chǎng (孟昶) | 934–965 | Míngdé (明德) 934–938; Guǎngzhèng (廣政) 938–965 |

== Rulers family tree ==
Later Shu

Li Keyong 李克用; 856–908
Lady Li d.932 | Meng Zhixiang 孟知祥 874–934; Gaozu 高祖; 934 | Empress; Dowager Li 李太后 d.965
Meng Chang 孟昶 919–965; Houzhu 后主; 934–965 | Consort Xu 徐惠妃 c.940–976 Madame Huarui 花蕊夫人
Meng Xuanzhe 孟玄喆 937-991; Duke of Teng 滕國公

== See also ==
- First Kingdom of Shu
- Second Kingdom of Shu
- Third Kingdom of Shu
