= 960s =

Decade

The 960s decade ran from January 1, 960, to December 31, 969.

== Events ==
=== 960 ===
==== By place ====
====== Byzantine Empire ======
- Summer – Siege of Chandax: A Byzantine fleet with an expeditionary force (comprising about 50,000 men) under Nikephoros Phokas lands on Crete. Nikephoros defeats the Muslim resistance and begins a siege at the capital of Chandax. He decides to blockade the city for the winter, while his engineers begin to construct siege engines. Emir Abd al-Aziz ibn Shu'ayb sends for aid by the Fatimids in Ifriqiya and the Caliphate of Córdoba (modern Spain).
- November 8 – Battle of Andrassos: The Byzantines under Leo Phokas the Younger defeat the Hamdanid army (30,000 men) in an ambush in the passages of the Cilician mountains, in south Asia Minor (modern-day Turkey). Emir Sayf al-Dawla barely manages to escape, and returns to Aleppo with only 300 horsemen. The Hamdanids can no longer afford to raid in Anatolia, which is a turning point in the Arab-Byzantine wars in the East.

====== Europe ======
- Mieszko I, a duke of the Piast Dynasty, becomes prince (de facto ruler) of Poland on the death of his father Siemomysł. Mieszko continues to subdue the neighbouring tribes under his control. Two obstacles to this plan are the Western Slav tribal group, the Veleti (also known as the Wilzi or "Wolf people") who are raiding Mieszko's lands for plunder; and the Saxon border dukes, who are pushing eastwards in search of new lands to conquer.
- Harald Bluetooth, king of Denmark, consolidates his rule over Jutland and Zealand. He adopts Christianity, erecting a carved stone at Jelling to honour his parents. It features a runic inscription (best-known in Denmark) and an image of Christ surrounded by interlace. The other Scandinavian kingdoms slowly convert to Christianity (approximate date).
- June/July – Adalbert II, co-ruler and the son of King Berengar II, with the support of Duke Hugh of Tuscany, invades the Papal States under Pope John XII. With Lombard forces closing in on Rome, a papal delegation is sent to King Otto I (the Great) to appeal for assistance.
- Autumn – Oberto I, margrave of the Obertenghi family, takes refuge in Germany. He travels with influential Italian leaders to the Saxon court of Otto I to intervene in Italy to protect him from Berengar II.
- Richard I (the Fearless), duke of Normandy, marries Emma of Paris. She is the daughter of Hugh the Great, former Duke of the Franks. The union gives him a permanent status to the House of Capet.

====== England ======
- Dunstan receives the pallium as archbishop of Canterbury from Pope John XII. He reforms monasteries and enforces the rule of Saint Benedict: poverty, chastity and obedience for monks.

====== Africa ======
- The Kingdom of Aksum (modern Eritrea) is destroyed by Beta Israel invaders, under the leadership of Queen Gudit (approximate date).

====== Asia ======
- February 4 – The Song Dynasty is established at Kaifeng by the 33-year-old military leader Zhao Kuangyin. He begins to unify the empire by conquering other lands and becomes the first emperor, called as Taizu of Song. The Song Dynasty will rule northern China for over 300 years (until 1279).

==== By topic ====
====== Religion ======
- Dunstan founds the Church of St. Dunstan in East Sussex.

=== 961 ===
==== By place ====
====== Byzantine Empire ======
- March 6 – Siege of Chandax: Byzantine forces under Nikephoros II Phokas capture and pillage Chandax after an 8-month siege. Nikephoros massacres the population without mercy and carries them off into slavery, returning to Constantinople with Emir Abd al-Aziz ibn Shu'ayb and his family as prisoners. The island Emirate of Crete is converted into a Byzantine theme and the remaining Muslims are converted to Christianity.

====== Europe ======
- May 26 – Otto I, Holy Roman Emperor elects his 6-year-old son Otto II as heir apparent and co-ruler at the Imperial Diet in Worms. He is crowned at Aachen, and placed under the tutelage of his grandmother Matilda and his half-brother William of Mainz. Otto's own brother Bruno I is charged with the provisional government of Lorraine again.
- Summer – Otto I leads an expeditionary force into northern Italy through the Brenner Pass at Trento, to assist the beleaguered young Pope John XII. He proceeds towards Pavia – King Berengar II sends his son and co-ruler Adalbert II from Rome at the head of a large army to seize control of the Upper Adige and contest Otto's entry.
- October 15 – Caliph Abd-al-Rahman III dies after a 32-year reign. He is succeeded by his son Al-Hakam II as ruler of the Caliphate of Córdoba in Al-Andalus (modern Spain).
- Battle of Fitjar – A Viking force under the sons of Eric Bloodaxe lands on Hordaland. King Haakon the Good defeats the rebelling force, but is killed. Harald Greycloak becomes ruler of the western part of Norway.
- The Lombard army under Adalbert II refuses to fight Otto I unless Berengar II abdicates in favor of Adalbert. Berengar refuses, and the armies retreat to their strongholds. Berengar and his family take whatever loyal soldiers remain and disperse themselves – Berengar retreats to the fortress at Montefeltro (in the Pentapolis).

====== Armenia ======
- King Ashot III of Armenia (the Merciful) moves his capital from Kars eastward to Ani (modern Turkey). Located on a major east-west caravan route, Ani will become larger than any European city, with a population of about 100,000 that will rival Baghdad, Cairo, and Constantinople. Ani also becomes the site of the royal mausoleum of the Bagratuni kings.

==== By topic ====
====== Art ======
- The "Shroud of Saint Josse", a rich silk Samite camel cloth from Khurasan, is made. It is preserved in the Abbey of Saint-Josse-sur-Mer, near Caen (Normandy) (approximate date).

====== Religion ======
- The Tiger Hill Pagoda (or Huqui Tower) is built in the city of Suzhou, located in Jiangsu Province (Eastern China).
- Tavistock Abbey is founded by Ordgar, Ealdorman of Devon, in England.

=== 962 ===
==== By place ====
====== Byzantine Empire ======
- December – Arab–Byzantine wars – Sack of Aleppo: A Byzantine expeditionary force under General Nikephoros Phokas invades northern Syria, and sacks Aleppo, capital of the Hamdanid emir Sayf al-Dawla. In late December Aleppo is taken by storm, with the population killed or enslaved; the city is razed. The Byzantine army takes possession of 390,000 silver dinars, 2,000 camels and 1,400 mules.

====== Europe ======
- February 2 – King Otto I (the Great) is crowned Holy Roman Emperor by Pope John XII at the Old St. Peter's Basilica, ending Rome's feudal anarchy. Otto's wife Adelaide is anointed as empress; the East Frankish Kingdom and the Kingdom of Italy are unified into a common realm, called the Roman Empire.
- February 13 – Otto I and John XII co-sign the Diploma Ottonianum, confirming John XII as the spiritual head of the Catholic Church. Otto recognizes John XII's secular control over the Papal States – by expanding the domain over the Exarchate of Ravenna, the Duchy of Spoleto, and the Duchy of Benevento.
- Summer – Otto I makes Oberto I, a margrave of the Obertenghi family, count palatine (a position second only to his own). He is granted the March of Obertenga (Eastern Liguria) and establishes his capital in Genoa. Oberto also receives the possessions of the Abbey of Bobbio (famous for its scriptorium).
- Otto I takes his army to lay siege at San Giulio, an island within Lake Orta (Piedmont), where Queen Willa (the wife of King Berengar II) has barricaded herself. She surrenders and is allowed to go free by Otto. Willa departs for Montefeltro to join her husband.
- Otto I proceeds to lay siege to Lake Garda, where the sons of Berengar II, Guy of Ivrea and Adalbert II (co-ruler of Italy), and their supporters are holed up. Finding severe resistance, Otto gives up the enterprise and returns to Pavia, the capital of Lombardy.
- Fall – Otto I receives news that John XII has betrayed him and entered into intrigues with Berengar II, but also with the Byzantine Empire. The letters are intercepted by Pandulf I (Ironhead), Lombard prince of Benevento.

====== Scotland ======
- Indulf, king of the Scots and Picts, dies after an 8-year reign. He is killed while fighting Vikings near Cullen, at the Battle of Bauds. Indulf is succeeded by his nephew Dub (Dub mac Maíl Coluim) as ruler of Scotland.

==== By topic ====
====== Religion ======
- St. Paul's Cathedral in London is destroyed by fire, but rebuilt in the same year.

=== 963 ===
==== By place ====
====== Byzantine Empire ======
- March 15 – Emperor Romanos II dies at age 39

, probably of poison administered by his wife, Empress Theophano. He is succeeded by his infant son Basil II. Theophano becomes regent and de facto ruler, naming her other son Constantine VIII (only 3 years old) as co-emperor of the Byzantine Empire.

- July 2 – Nikephoros II Phokas is proclaimed emperor by his troops in Caesarea. He sends a fleet to secure the Bosphorus Strait against his enemies. Chief minister Joseph Bringas gathers support and closes the gates of Constantinople. General Marianos Argyros is killed in a riot, forcing Bringas to flee.
- August 16 – Nikephoros II makes a triumphal entry in Constantinople and is hailed as 'the conqueror'. He is crowned emperor in Hagia Sophia.
- September 20 – Nikephoros II marries the former Byzantine consort Theophano, the widow of Emperor Romanos II, bolstering his legitimacy.

====== Europe ======
- Gero I, margrave of Merseburg, campaigns against the Slavs. He forces Prince Mieszko I of the Polans in Poland to pay tribute to Emperor Otto I ( the Great). He expands his territory, the Marca Geronis (March of Gero), to the mouth of the Oder River.
- Sviatoslav I, Grand Prince of Kyiv, begins a 2-year campaign in which he will defeat Khazar forces along the Don River – vanquish the Ossetes and the Circassians in the northern Caucasus. He also successfully attacks the Bulgars on the Volga River.
- November – Otto arrives at Rome; Pope John XII and Adalbert II (co-ruler of Italy) flee to Campania, taking with them most of the Papal treasury. The Roman citizens warmly receive Otto as a 'liberator'.
- December – King Berengar II (the father of Adalbert II) surrenders at the fortress of Montefeltro to German forces. He and his wife Willa are taken prisoner and dispatched to Bamberg.
- Luxembourg has her beginnings at Luxembourg Castle (located on the Bock), founded by Sigfried, count of the Ardennes.

====== Asia ======
- The Chinese government of the Song Dynasty attempted to ban the practice of cremation; despite this decree, the lower and middle classes continued to cremate their dead until the government resolved the problem in the [[12th century], establishing public graveyards for paupers.
- The Nanping State, one of the Ten Kingdoms in south-central China, is forced to surrender, when invaded by armies of the Song Dynasty.

==== By topic ====
====== Religion ======
- November 6 – Synod of Rome: Otto I calls a council at St. Peter's Basilica. John XII is deposed on charges that he has conducted himself dishonorably and instigated an armed rebellion against Otto.
- December 6 – Pope Leo VIII is appointed to the office of Protonotary and begins his papacy as antipope of Rome – a reign with the concurrently deposed John XII.
- The Monastery of Great Lavra at Mount Athos (northeastern Greece) is founded by the Byzantine monk Athanasius the Athonite.

=== 964 ===
==== Byzantine Empire ====
- Arab–Byzantine War: Emperor Nikephoros II continues the reconquest of south-eastern Anatolia (modern Turkey). He recaptures Cyprus, and reorganizes the conquered lands into new themes. In the summer, they take the fortress cities of Anazarbus and Adana. Byzantine troops under General John Tzimiskes besiege Mopsuestia, but with the coming of winter he is forced to retreat to Caesarea.
- October 24–25 – Siege of Rometta: Nikephoros II sends an expedition to Sicily. The Byzantine army (40,000 men) is sent to break the Muslim siege at Rometta, and to regain Sicily for the Byzantine Empire. For two days a battle takes place in the area between the beach and the besieged citadel of Rometta. The Saracens (under Al-Hasan ibn Ammar) manage to defeat the Byzantine relief force.

==== Europe ====
- Spring – King Adalbert II returns to the mainland of Italy, and occupies the environs of Spoleto. Emperor Otto I ('the Great') leaves Rome with his army, and lays siege to the fortress city of Spoleto.
- Otto I proceeds on campaign in Italy, remaining in the environs of Lucca. In the fall he leaves plague-wracked Tuscany, and is forced to retreat to Liguria. His rearguard is attacked by Adalbert II.

==== By topic ====
====== Religion ======
- February – Pope John XII returns with his supporters to Rome. He convenes a synod that deposes Antipope Leo VIII who finds refuge at the court of Otto I. John dispatches a delegation under Otgar, bishop of Speyer, to negotiate an agreement.
- May 14 – Pope John XII dies (rumoured to be by apoplexy, or at the hands of a cuckolded husband, during an illicit sexual liaison) after a 9-year reign. The Romans elect Benedict V, who is acclaimed by the city militia. He begins his pontificate as the 131st pope of the Catholic Church.
- June 23 – Benedict V is deposed and ecclesiastically degraded after Otto I besieges Rome. He starves the Romans into submission and restores Leo VIII to the papal throne.

====== Science ======
- Abd al-Rahman al-Sufi, a Persian astronomer, writes the Book of Fixed Stars

=== 965 ===
==== By place ====
====== Byzantine Empire ======
- Arab–Byzantine War: Emperor Nikephoros II conquers the fortress cities of Tarsus and Mopsuestia. The Muslim residents abandon the defense and flee into Syria. Nikephoros completes the conquest of Cilicia; Muslim raids into Anatolia (modern Turkey) permanently cease. Byzantine troops under General Niketas Chalkoutzes occupy Cyprus, liberating the Greek population from Muslim domination.
- Battle of the Straits: The Byzantine attempt to recover Sicily fails, when the Byzantine fleet is annihilated by the Fatimids. The last Byzantine stronghold on the island, Rometta, surrenders. The population is massacred, and the survivors are sold into slavery. Caliph Al-Mu'izz li-Din Allah completes the conquest of Sicily, and establishes naval superiority in the Western Mediterranean.

====== Europe ======
- Spring – King Lothair III exploits the succession crisis in Flanders and captures many cities, but is eventually repulsed by the supporters of Arnulf II – the son of Baldwin III and former co-ruler of Flanders. Lothair attempts to increase his influence in Lotharingia, once held by the Carolingian dynasty. Emperor Otto I (the Great) encourages resistance to Lothair's overtures.
- Boleslaus I (the Cruel), duke of Bohemia, expands his territory into the Polish territories of Upper Silesia and Lesser Poland. By occupying the city of Kraków, he controls important trade routes from Prague to Kyiv and Lviv. Prince Mieszko I of Poland makes an alliance with Boleslaus and marries his daughter Dobrawa.
- The Khazar fortress city of Sarkel, located on the Lower Don River, is captured by Kievan Rus' under Grand Prince Sviatoslav I. The city is renamed Belaya Vezha (White Fortress) and settled by Slavs.

====== China ======
- July 12 – Emperor Meng Chang of Later Shu dies after a 30-year reign. His kingdom is invaded and incorporated into the expanding Song dynasty.

==== By topic ====
====== Literature ======
- September 23 – Al-Mutanabbi, an Abbasid poet, returns from 5 years in Mesopotamia. He has lived at Shiraz under the protection of the Buyid emir 'Adud al-Dawla, but bandits kill him near An Numaniyah (modern Iran).

====== Religion ======
- March 1 – Pope Leo VIII dies after a 13-month reign. He is succeeded by John XIII as the 133rd pope of the Catholic Church.

=== 966 ===
==== Byzantine Empire ====
- 23 June - Byzantine-Arab War: A prisoner exchange occurs at the border between the Byzantine Empire and the Emirate of Aleppo at Samosata, headed by Emperor Nikephoros II and Sayf al-Dawla, the Emir of Aleppo. The Emirate receives 3,000 captured prisoners from the region of Cilicia, after its conquest by the Byzantine Emperor, as well as the poet Abu Firas, who had been previously held prisoner by the Byzantines.

==== Europe ====
- Spring – King Lothair III marries Princess Emma of Italy (the only daughter of Adelaide of Burgundy—second wife of Emperor Otto I (the Great), from her first marriage with King Lothair II, member of the Bosonid dynasty). Lothair strengthens his ties with the Holy Roman Empire. He temporarily remains in control of the cities of Arras and Douai. The latter becomes a flourishing textile market centre during the Middle Ages.
- April 14 – Mieszko I, first duke and prince of Poland, is baptized a Christian, which is usually considered the foundation of the Polish state. Mieszko's baptism, under the influence of his wife Dobrawa, brings his territories into the community of Christian countries. The lands ruled by Mieszko cover about 250,000 km², and are inhabited by about 1,2 million people around this time.
- May – Pietro IV Candiano, doge of Venice, remarries to Waldrada of Tuscany, a daughter of Hubert, Duke of Spoleto, and a relative of Otto I. Waldrada brings him a large dowry, including the possessions of Ferrara, Friuli and Treviso (Northern Italy).
- Fall – Otto I departs for a third expedition in Italy and fights in Lombardy against the partisans under Adalbert II of Ivrea. In November an imperial counter-coup in Rome takes control of Castel Sant'Angelo.
- Winter – Otto I enters Rome and has the twelve principal militia leaders (the Decarcones) hanged. Other plotters of the coup are either executed or blinded. Otto is declared 'liberator of the Church'.
- The Hungarians invade the Bulgarian Empire and force Peter I, emperor (tsar) of the Bulgarians, to conclude a peace treaty with them. He lets them cross to attack the Byzantine Empire.

==== Asia ====
- February 9 – Ono no Michikaze (Ono no Tōfū), Japanese calligrapher, dies after having established the foundations of the 'Waystyle' of calligraphy while serving the imperial court at Heian-kyō (modern-day Kyoto).

==== By topic ====
====== Religion ======
- John VII, patriarch of Jerusalem, is burned at the stake by a Muslim mob after writing to Emperor Nikephoros II, pleading him to intervene in Palestine and retake it from the Fatimid Caliphate.
- Re-foundation of Peterborough (also called Medeshamstede) Abbey as a Benedictine monastery by Bishop Æthelwold of Winchester (approximate date).

=== 967 ===
==== By place ====
====== Europe ======
- Spring – Emperor Otto I (the Great) calls for a council at Rome, to present the new government under Pope John XIII. He asserts his rights in the city, and insists on the occasional presence of an imperial judge, alongside the papal court. The era of Roman independence is over. Grado becomes the patriarchal and metropolitan church of the whole of the Veneto.
- Otto I goes on a tour of the Lombard duchies of southern Italy. In Capua he grants Pandulf I (Ironhead) the vacant Duchy of Spoleto and Camerino and charges him with prosecuting the war against the Byzantine Empire. In Benevento, Otto receives the homage of Pandulf's brother and co-ruler Landulf III. In Salerno he receives also the support of Gisulf I.
- Otto I dispatches an imperial delegation (led by a Venetian named Domenico) to Constantinople with assurances of his friendship and a request for Princess Theophano (a daughter of the late Emperor Romanos II) for his 12-year-old son Otto II. As dowry Otto demands the Byzantine holdings in southern Italy.
- Summer – Sviatoslav I, Grand Prince of Kiev, defeats Bulgar forces in the Balkans at the behest of Emperor Nikephoros II (who pays him 1,500 pounds of gold to invade the Bulgarian Empire).
- The imperial delegation arrives in Macedonia, but goes nowhere with Nikephoros II. Far from offering Byzantine Italy as dowry for Theophano, Nikephoros refuses to accept the claims of Otto I.
- Otto I renews the imperial treaty with Pietro IV Candiano, doge of Venice. He grants him commercial privileges, and protection for Venetian citizens (also the possessions of Venetian bishops).
- Winter – Otto I returns to Rome. On Christmas day, John XIII crowns Otto II as co-emperor of the Holy Roman Empire. Although Otto II is nominated as co-ruler, he exercises no real authority.
- Olaf Tryggvason flees Norway with his mother, only to be attacked by Estonian Vikings (approximate date).

====== Arabian Empire ======
- Emir Nasir al-Dawla is deposed and imprisoned at Mosul after a 32-year reign by his son Abu Taghlib, the de facto governor, and supporters. He becomes the new ruler of the Emirate of Mosul.
- The Fatimid general Jawhar al-Siqilli launches a military campaign in the west of the Maghreb. He resumes his expansion, together with the Zirids, and conquers Fez (modern-day Morocco).

====== Japan ======
- July 5 – Emperor Murakami dies after a 21-year reign. He is succeeded by his 17-year-old son Reizei, who is insane and becomes the 63rd emperor of Japan.

==== By topic ====
====== Religion ======
- Otto I completes and dedicates a new cathedral at Magdeburg in Saxony. Like other imperial churches of the period, it includes a westwork – a structure attached to the entrance wall and outfitted with galleries. Otto makes Magdeburg a base for missionary efforts to convert the Slavs to the east. The patron saint of the city is Mauritius, who, as a military leader fighting for Christianity against pagan armies, shares affinities with Otto himself.
- Re-foundation of Romsey Abbey in Hampshire by King Edgar I (the Peaceful). He appoints Merewenna, an English noblewoman, as abbess who becomes a foster mother to Princess Ælfflæd (a step-daughter of Edgar).
- April 22 – The Cambodian temple Banteay Srei is consecrated and dedicated to the Hindu god Shiva.

=== 968 ===
==== By place ====
====== Byzantine Empire ======
- Emperor Nikephoros II receives a Bulgarian embassy led by Prince Boris (the son of Tsar Peter I of Bulgaria), with a plea for help against the invading Kievan Rus'. Nikephoros, occupied in the East, is unable to support him. Instead he sends envoys to summon the Pechenegs to aid Boris. They besiege Kiev, but Grand Prince Sviatoslav I (on campaign in Bulgaria) returns with a Kievan relief force, and defeats the Pechenegs. He drives them out into the Steppe, and sets up viceroys to rule his Rus' territory.

====== Europe ======
- Spring – Emperor Otto I (the Great) travels to Capua to meet there with ambassadors of Nikephoros II, who again reiterate their friendship, but refuse to consent to his dowry demands (see 967). Otto invades the Byzantine Theme of Langobardia with a Lombard expeditionary force. With the assistance of Benevento-Capua and naval support from Pisa, Otto attempts to take Bari by assault, but Byzantine resistance is stiff, and Otto withdraws back to Ravenna.
- Battle of Silistra: A Kievan army (60,000 men) led by Sviatoslav I crosses the Lower Danube and defeats the Bulgarians at Silistra. He occupies most of the Dobruja by seizing 80 fortresses in northeastern Bulgaria. They are looted and destroyed but not permanently occupied. During the winter, Sviatoslav transfers the capital from Kiev to Pereyaslavets.
- Pandulf I (Ironhead), a Lombard prince, takes over the territory of Benevento and Capua after the death of his brother Landulf III. He appoints his son Landulf IV as co-prince of Benevento, and disinherits Pandulf II (a son of Landulf III) as lord of Sant'Agata (located northeast of Naples).

====== Ireland ======
- Battle of Sulcoit: The Irish of the Dál gCais led by Brian Boru defeats the Viking forces of Limerick. After the battle the Dál gCais seize and burn the Viking stronghold of Limerick. Ending of Norse expansion in Ireland.

==== By topic ====
====== Religion ======
- Otto I founds the Archbishopric of Magdeburg at the synod of Ravenna. He appoints Adalbert as the archbishop of Magdeburg. The archbishopric under Adalbert includes the bishoprics of Brandenburg and Havelberg — as well as the newly erected sees of Meissen, Merseburg and Naumburg-Zeitz.
- Mieszko I, duke and prince of Poland, constructs Poznań Cathedral within the fortified stronghold (gord) of Poznań. The settlement becomes a bishopric, Mieszko appoints Jordan as the first bishop.

=== 969 ===
==== By place ====
====== Byzantine Empire ======
- October 28 – Siege of Antioch: Byzantine general Michael Bourtzes (during a night attack) seizes part of Antioch's fortifications. The capture of the city from the Hamdanids is completed three days later, when reinforcements under the stratopedarches Peter Phokas arrive. The Byzantine army then moves deeper into Syrian territory — besieging and taking the city of Aleppo.
- December 11 – Emperor Nikephoros II is murdered in the royal palace of Boukoleon at Constantinople after a 6-year reign. Former friends have acted on the instructions of his wife Theophano. Nikephoros is succeeded by his nephew John I Tzimiskes, who becomes co-emperor and regent. He sends Theophano into exile to the island of Prinkipo (Prince Islands).

====== Europe ======
- Peter I, emperor (tsar) of the Bulgarian Empire, suffers a stroke and abdicates the throne in favour of his eldest son Boris II. He arrives (after being an honorary hostage at Constantinople) in Preslav and is proclaimed as the new ruler. Boris regains lost territory from the Kievan Rus' and recaptures Pereyaslavets, an important trade city at the mouth of the Danube.
- Summer – Grand Prince Sviatoslav I invades Bulgaria at the head of a Kievan army, which includes Pecheneg and Hungarian auxiliary forces. He defeats the Bulgarians in a major battle and retakes Pereyaslavets. Boris II capitulates and impales 300 Bulgarian boyars for disloyalty. Sviatoslav assigns garrisons to the conquered fortresses in Northern Bulgaria.
- Pandulf Ironhead, duke of Benevento and Capua, leads the siege of Bovino. He is captured by the Byzantines and taken in chains to Bari, and jailed in Constantinople. Neapolitan forces under Marinus II, duke of Naples, invade Benevento-Capua, capture the city of Avellino and then lay siege to Capua.
- Otto I 'the Great', Holy Roman Emperor, assembles a large expeditionary force at Pavia, joined by Spoletan troops. He counter-attacks, relieves the siege of Capua and devastates the area around Naples. Otto enters Benevento, where he is received as 'liberator' by Landulf IV and in the cities of Apulia (Southern Italy).

====== Africa ======
- February 6–July 9 – Fatimid conquest of Egypt: Caliph Al-Mu'izz's army under General Jawhar invades Egypt. Jawhar occupies the lands around the Nile from the Ikhshidids after a siege at Giza and the capitulation of Fustat.

====== Asia ======
- September 27 – Emperor Reizei abdicates the throne of Japan (due to a mental illness) after a 2-year reign. He is succeeded by his 10-year-old brother En'yū, who becomes the 64th emperor.

==== By topic ====
====== Geography ======
- Ibn Hawqal concludes his travels.

====== Religion ======
- Summer – Pope John XIII convenes a synod at Rome. He raises the bishopric of Benevento to Archbishopric of Benevento. The city is made a metropolitan see over 10 bishoprics in Byzantine Capitanata (Southern Italy).

== Significant people ==
- Abd al-Rahman III caliph of Córdoba
- Otto I of Holy Roman empire
- Al-Muti caliph of Baghdad
- Al-Hakam II caliph of Córdoba
- Al-Mu'izz li-Din Allah of Fatimid dynasty
- Pope John XII
- Pope Benedict V
- Pope Leo VIII

== Births ==
960

- Abu Nasr Mansur, Persian mathematician (approximate date)
- Aimoin, French monk and chronicler (approximate date)
- Arnulf II (the Younger), Frankish nobleman (or 961)
- Bagrat III, king of Abkhazia (Georgia) (d. 1014)
- Bernward, bishop of Hildesheim (approximate date)
- Constantine VIII, Byzantine emperor (d. 1028)
- Eckard I, German nobleman (approximate date)
- Fan Kuan, Chinese landscape painter (approximate date)
- Gershom ben Judah, German rabbi (approximate date)
- Gormflaith ingen Murchada, Irish queen (d. 1030)
- Gotthard, bishop of Hildesheim (d. 1038)
- Hugh III, French nobleman (approximate date)
- Indra Pala, king of Kamarupa (India) (d. 990)
- Li, empress consort of the Song Dynasty (d. 1004)
- Mazu, Chinese fisherman's daughter and worshipped as Taoist goddess (approximate date)
- Sharaf al-Dawla, Buyid emir of Kerman and Fars (approximate date)
- Sigurd the Stout, Viking nobleman (earl) (approximate date)
- Sweyn Forkbeard, king of Denmark and England (d. 1014)
- Xu You, official and court minister of Southern Tang

961

- January 15 – Seongjong, ruler of Goryeo (Korea) (d. 997)
- Al-Tha'alibi, Persian historian and writer (d. 1038)
- Arnulf II, Count of Flanders (the Younger), Frankish nobleman (or 960)
- Edith of Wilton, English princess and nun (approximate date)
- Fujiwara no Michikane, Japanese nobleman (d. 995)
- Kou Zhun, Chinese Grand chancellor (approximate date)
- Mahendradatta, queen of Bali (Indonesia) (d. 1011)
- Pietro II Orseolo, Doge of Venice (d. 1009)
- Ramiro III, king of León (Spain) (d. 985)
- Sigmundur Brestisson, Viking chieftain (d. 1005)

962

- Bernard Roger, French nobleman (approximate date)
- Edward II (the Martyr), king of England (approximate date)
- Geoffrey (or Godfrey), French nobleman (d. 1015)
- Ibn Faradi, Moorish scholar and historian (d. 1012)
- Liu Mei, Chinese official and general (approximate date)
- Odilo of Cluny, French Benedictine abbot (d. 1049)
- Rogneda of Polotsk, Grand Princess of Kiev (d. 1002)
- Wang Qinruo, Chinese chancellor (approximate date)
- William of Volpiano, Italian abbot and architect (d. 1031)

963

- March 13 – Anna Porphyrogenita, Grand Princess of Kiev (d. 1011)
- April 17 – Sweyn Forkbeard, king of Denmark and Norway (d. 1014)
- Edith of Wilton, English princess and abbess (approximate date)
- Li Jiqian, Chinese governor and rebel leader (d. 1004)
- Nuh II, emir of the Samanid Dynasty (Iran) (d. 997)
- Samsam al-Dawla, Buyid emir (approximate date)
- Snorri Goði, Icelandic Viking chieftain (d. 1031)

964

- Bertha of Burgundy, Frankish queen consort (d. 1010)
- Heonae, Korean queen consort and regent (d. 1029)
- Liu Wenzhi, official of the Song Dynasty (d. 1028)

965

- Dudo of Saint-Quentin, Norman historian (approximate date)
- Frederick of Luxembourg, count of Moselgau (d. 1019)
- Gerberga of Burgundy, duchess consort of Swabia (or 966)
- Godfrey II, count and duke of Lower Lorraine (d. 1023)
- Hárek of Tjøtta, Norwegian chieftain (approximate date)
- Hugh I, count of Empúries and Peralada (approximate date)
- Ibn al-Haytham, Arab astronomer and physicist (d. 1040)
- Leo of Vercelli, German bishop (approximate date)
- Sharif al-Murtaza, Buyid Shia scholar (d. 1044)
- Theodoric I, duke of Upper Lorraine (approximate date)

966

- Æthelred II (the Unready), king of England (approximate date)
- Ali al-Sulayhi, sultan of Yemen, Tihamah and Mecca (d. 1066)
- Ding Wei, grand chancellor of the Song dynasty (d. 1037)
- Fujiwara no Kintō, Japanese poet and bureaucrat (d. 1041)
- Fujiwara no Michinaga, Japanese nobleman (d. 1028)
- Gerberga of Burgundy, duchess of Swabia (or 965)
- Heonjeong, queen of Goryeo (Korea) (d. 992)
- Hisham II, caliph of Córdoba (Spain) (d. 1013)
- Kenneth III, king of Scotland (approximate date)
- Louis V, king of the West Frankish Kingdom (d. 987)
- Lu Zongdao, Chinese official (approximate date)
- Sei Shōnagon, Japanese poet and court lady (approximate date)

967

- December 7 – Abū-Sa'īd Abul-Khayr, Persian Sufi poet (d. 1049)
- Bolesław I (the Brave), king of Poland (d. 1025)
- Gothelo I, duke of Lorraine (approximate date)
- Lin Bu, Chinese poet and calligrapher (d. 1028)
- Vahram Pahlavouni, prince of Bjni (Armenia) (d. 1045)
- Walter of Speyer, German bishop and poet (d. 1027)

968

- November 29 – Kazan, emperor of Japan (d. 1008)
- December 21 – Minamoto no Yorinobu, Japanese samurai (d. 1048)
- December 23 – Zhen Zong, emperor of the Song Dynasty (d. 1022)
- Gisela, French princess and daughter of Hugh Capet (d. 1002)
- Pan, Chinese princess and wife of Zhen Zong (d. 989)
- Romanos III, emperor of the Byzantine Empire (d. 1034)

969

- Badi' al-Zaman al-Hamadani, Persian poet and writer (d. 1007)
- Hilal al-Sabi', Buyid bureaucrat and historian (d. 1056)
- Judith of Hungary, princess and queen of Poland (d. 988)
- Liu, empress and regent of the Song dynasty (d. 1033)
- Nathar Shah, Tamil mystic and preacher (d. 1039)
- William V 'the Great', duke of Aquitaine (d. 1030)

== Deaths ==
960

- May 31 – Fujiwara no Morosuke, Japanese statesman (b. 909)
- June 15 – Eadburh of Winchester, English princess and saint
- June 23 – Feng Yanji, chancellor of Southern Tang (b. 903)
- August 12 – Li Gu, chancellor of Later Zhou (b. 903)
- Ælfric, bishop of Hereford (approximate date)
- Adele of Vermandois, Frankish noblewoman
- Arnold I of Astarac, Frankish nobleman
- Bernard the Dane, Viking nobleman (approximate date)
- Časlav, prince of Serbia (approximate date)
- Emmanuel I, patriarch of the Church of the East
- Fulk II (the Good), Frankish nobleman
- Gao Baorong, king of Nanping (Ten Kingdoms) (b. 920)
- George II, king of Abkhazia (Georgia)
- Gopala II, ruler of the Pala Empire (India)
- Guan Tong, Chinese landscape painter
- Justan I ibn Marzuban, Sallarid ruler
- Lhachen Dpalgyimgon, king of Mauyul (Tibet)
- Murchadh mac Aodha, king of Uí Maine (Ireland)
- Ratna Pala, king of Kamarupa (India) (b. 920)
- Siemomysł, duke of the Piast Dynasty (Poland)
- William Garés, Frankish nobleman
- Yelü Lihu, prince of the Khitan Empire (b. 911)

961

- July 17 – Du, empress dowager of the Song dynasty
- August 12 – Li Jing, emperor of Southern Tang (b. 916)
- September 19 – Helena Lekapene, Byzantine empress
- October 1 – Artald, archbishop of Reims
- October 15 – Abd al-Rahman III, caliph of Córdoba
- Abd al-Malik I, Samanid emir (b. 944)
- Abu'l-Qasim Unujur ibn al-Ikhshid, Ikhshidid ruler
- Adarnase V, prince of Tao-Klarjeti (Georgia)
- Atto of Vercelli, Lombard bishop (b. 885)
- Ava of Cerdanya, countess regent of Cerdanya and Besalú
- Butuga II, ruler of the Western Ganga Dynasty (India)
- Fujiwara no Masatada, Japanese poet
- Haakon the Good, king of Norway
- Landulf II of Benevento (the Red), Lombard prince
- Li Tao, Chinese chancellor (approximate date)
- Minamoto no Tsunemoto, Japanese samurai (b. 894)
- Raymond II of Rouergue, Frankish nobleman (approximate date)
- William II, Marquess of Montferrat, Frankish nobleman (approximate date)

962

- April 26 – Adalbero I, bishop of Metz
- May 23 – Guibert, Frankish abbot (b. 892)
- October 14 – Gerloc, Frankish noblewoman
- Æthelwald, ealdorman of East Anglia
- Baldwin III (the Young), Frankish nobleman
- Charles Constantine, Frankish nobleman
- Dong Yuan, Chinese painter (approximate date)
- Gao Baoxu, king of Nanping (China) (b. 924)
- Gauzelin, Frankish nobleman and bishop
- Hamza al-Isfahani, Persian historian (approximate date)
- Hugh of Vermandois, Frankish archbishop (b. 920)
- Ibn az-Zayyat, Hamdanid governor
- Indulf (the Aggressor), king of Scotland
- Liu Congxiao, Chinese general (b. 906)
- Ordoño IV, king of León (or 963)
- Sigurd Haakonsson, Norse Viking nobleman
- William Taillefer I, Frankish nobleman

963

- March 15 – Romanos II, Byzantine emperor (b. 938)
- March 31 – Abu Ja'far Ahmad ibn Muhammad, Saffarid emir (b. 906)
- April 3 – William III, duke of Aquitaine (b. 915)
- April 10 – Oda of Metz, German noblewoman
- April 16 – William I, German nobleman
- April 18 – Stephen Lekapenos, Byzantine co-emperor
- August 16 – Marianos Argyros, Byzantine general
- Abu Muhammad al-Hasan, Buyid vizier
- Alp-Tegin, Samanid commander-in-chief
- Donnchad mac Cellacháin, king of Munster (Ireland)
- Fothad I, bishop of St. Andrews (approximate date)
- Goltregoda, Frankish countess and regent (b. 920)
- Ingeborg Tryggvasdotter, Viking noblewoman
- John II, duke of Gaeta (Italy) (approximate date)
- Michael Maleinos, Byzantine monk (approximate date)
- Ordoño IV (the Bad), king of León (or 962)
- Rudolfe II (or Raoul), Frankish nobleman
- Tryggve Olafsson, Norse Viking king
- Wang, empress of the Song Dynasty (b. 942)

964

- May 14 – John XII, pope of the Catholic Church
- July 3 – Henry I, Frankish nobleman and archbishop
- November 5 – Fan Zhi, chancellor of the Song Dynasty
- December 8 – Zhou (the Elder), Chinese queen consort
- Al-Hasan ibn Ali al-Kalbi, Fatimid nobleman and emir
- Fujiwara no Anshi, empress consort of Japan (b. 927)
- Godfrey I, count and vice-duke of Lower Lorraine
- Khosrov of Andzev, Armenian monk and poet
- Toichleach ua Gadhra, king of Gailenga (Ireland)

965

- February 22 – Otto, duke of Burgundy (b. 944)
- March 1 – Leo VIII, pope of the Catholic Church
- March 28 – Arnulf I, count of Flanders
- May 20 – Gero (the Great), Frankish nobleman
- June 25 – Guy, margrave of Ivrea (b. 940)
- July 4 – Benedict V, pope of the Catholic Church
- July 12 – Meng Chang, emperor of Later Shu (b. 919)
- September 23 – Al-Mutanabbi, Abbasid poet (b. 915)
- October 11 – Bruno I, archbishop of Cologne (b. 925)
- Al-Husayn ibn Ali al-Maghribi, Abbasid statesman
- Guo Chong, Chinese general (approximate date)
- Hedwig of Saxony, Frankish duchess and regent
- Li, empress dowager of Later Shu (Ten Kingdoms)
- Li Hao, Chinese chancellor (approximate date)
- Moses ben Hanoch, Jewish rabbi (approximate date)
- Joseph Bringas, Byzantine eunuch and official
- Wu Cheng, Chinese chancellor (b. 893)
- Zhong, empress consort of Southern Tang

966

- January 19 – Fujiwara no Asatada, Japanese nobleman (b. 910)
- February 9 – Ono no Michikaze, Japanese calligrapher (b. 894)
- March 28 – Flodoard, Frankish canon and chronicler
- August 4 – Berengar II, margrave and king of Italy
- December 19 – Sancho I, king of León (Spain)
- Abu Ishaq Ibrahim, Samanid governor
- Abu'l-Hasan Ali, Ikhshidid governor
- Bagrat II, prince of Tao-Klarjeti (Georgia)
- Bertha of Swabia, Frankish queen consort
- Cormac ua Cillín, abbot of Tuamgraney (Ireland)
- John VII, patriarch of Jerusalem (Israel)
- Viśa' Saṃbhava, king of Khotan (China)
- Nako, Obotrite prince (approximate date)
- Rashiq al-Nasimi, Hamdanid governor
- Sergius I, duke of Amalfi (Italy)

967

- February 9 – Sayf al-Dawla, Hamdanid emir (b. 916)
- April 8 – Mu'izz al-Dawla, Buyid emir (b. 915)
- May 10 – Renaud of Roucy, Viking nobleman
- July 5 – Murakami, emperor of Japan (b. 926)
- September 22 – Wichmann II, Frankish nobleman
- October 20 – Li Yixing, Chinese governor
- Abu al-Faraj al-Isfahani, Umayyad historian (b. 897)
- Abu 'Ali Muhammad ibn Ilyas, Ilyasid emir
- Aleramo di Savona, marquess of Montferrat
- Al-Qabisi, Hamdanid astrologer (approximate date)
- Ashot III, prince of Taron (approximate date)
- Boleslaus I (the Cruel), duke of Bohemia (or 972)
- Dub mac Maíl Coluīm, king of Alba (Scotland)
- Fergal ua Ruairc, king of Connacht (Ireland)
- Hugh II (the Kind), lord of Lusignan
- Krishna III, ruler of the Rashtrakuta Dynasty
- Li Cheng, Chinese painter (b. 919)
- Robert of Vermandois, Frankish nobleman (or 968)
- Vushmgir, Ziyarid emir (approximate date)
- Wahsudan ibn Muhammad, Sallarid emir
- Yan Xu, Chinese chancellor (b. 910)

968

- March 2 – William, archbishop of Mainz (b. 929)
- March 14 – Matilda of Ringelheim, Frankish queen
- March 19 – Emma of Paris, duchess of Normandy (b. 943)
- April 2 – Yuan Dezhao, Chinese chancellor (b. 891)
- April 4 – Abu Firas al-Hamdani, Arab prince and poet (b. 932)
- Abu al-Misk Kafur, Ikhshidid vizier of Egypt (b. 905)
- Aldred, bishop of Lindisfarne (approximate date)
- Al-Muttaqi, Abbasid caliph (b. 908)
- Ananias I, catholicos of the Armenian Apostolic Church
- Bardas Phokas (the Elder), Byzantine general
- Eadgifu, wife of Edward the Elder (approximate date)
- John III, duke of Naples (approximate date)
- Landulf III, prince of Benevento (or 969)
- Liu Jun, emperor of Northern Han (b. 926)
- Mord Fiddle, Icelandic farmer and law expert
- Mumadona Dias, countess of Portugal
- Rajendravarman II, ruler of the Khmer Empire
- Robert of Vermandois, Frankish nobleman (or 967)
- Sun Guangxian, Chinese chief strategist
- Sunifred II, Frankish nobleman (b. 915)

969

- March 12 – Mu Zong, emperor of the Liao dynasty (b. 931)
- June 26 – George El Mozahem, Egyptian martyr (b. 940)
- July 11 – Olga of Kiev, princess and regent of Russia (b. c. 890)
- September 25 – Burchard, bishop of Meissen (approximate date)
- December 1 – Fujiwara no Morotada, Japanese statesman (b. 920)
- December 11 – Nikephoros II, emperor of the Byzantine Empire
- Dou Zhengu, Chinese official and chancellor of the Tang dynasty (b. 892)
- Landulf III, prince of Benevento and Capua (or 968)
- Michael Krešimir II, king of Croatia (House of Trpimir)
- Nasir al-Dawla, deposed Hamdanid emir of Mosul
