= 968 =

Calendar year

968 in various calendars
- Gregorian calendar: 968; CMLXVIII
- Ab urbe condita: 1721
- Armenian calendar: 417; ԹՎ ՆԺԷ
- Assyrian calendar: 5718
- Balinese saka calendar: 889–890
- Bengali calendar: 374–375
- Berber calendar: 1918
- Buddhist calendar: 1512
- Burmese calendar: 330
- Byzantine calendar: 6476–6477
- Chinese calendar: 丁卯年 (Fire Rabbit); 3665 or 3458 — to — 戊辰年 (Earth Dragon); 3666 or 3459
- Coptic calendar: 684–685
- Discordian calendar: 2134
- Ethiopian calendar: 960–961
- Hebrew calendar: 4728–4729
- Hindu calendars
- Vikram Samvat: 1024–1025
- Shaka Samvat: 889–890
- Kali Yuga: 4068–4069
- Holocene calendar: 10968
- Iranian calendar: 346–347
- Islamic calendar: 357–358
- Japanese calendar: Kōhō 5 / Anna 1 (安和元年)
- Javanese calendar: 868–870
- Julian calendar: 968; CMLXVIII
- Korean calendar: 3301
- Minguo calendar: 944 before ROC 民前944年
- Nanakshahi calendar: −500
- Seleucid era: 1279/1280 AG
- Thai solar calendar: 1510–1511
- Tibetan calendar: མེ་མོ་ཡོས་ལོ་ (female Fire-Hare); 1094 or 713 or −59 — to — ས་ཕོ་འབྲུག་ལོ་ (male Earth-Dragon); 1095 or 714 or −58

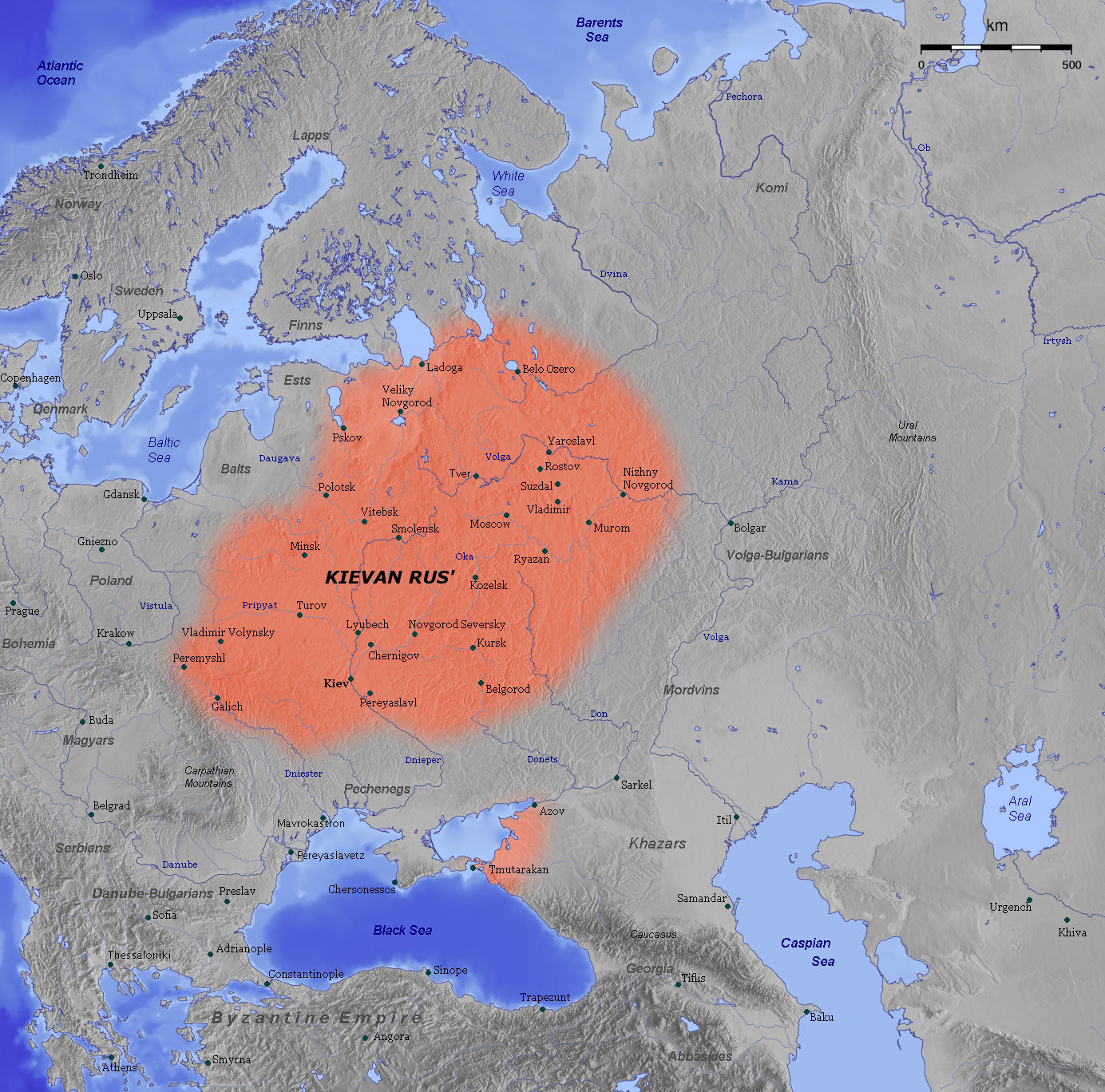
Realm of Kievan Rus', mid-10th century.

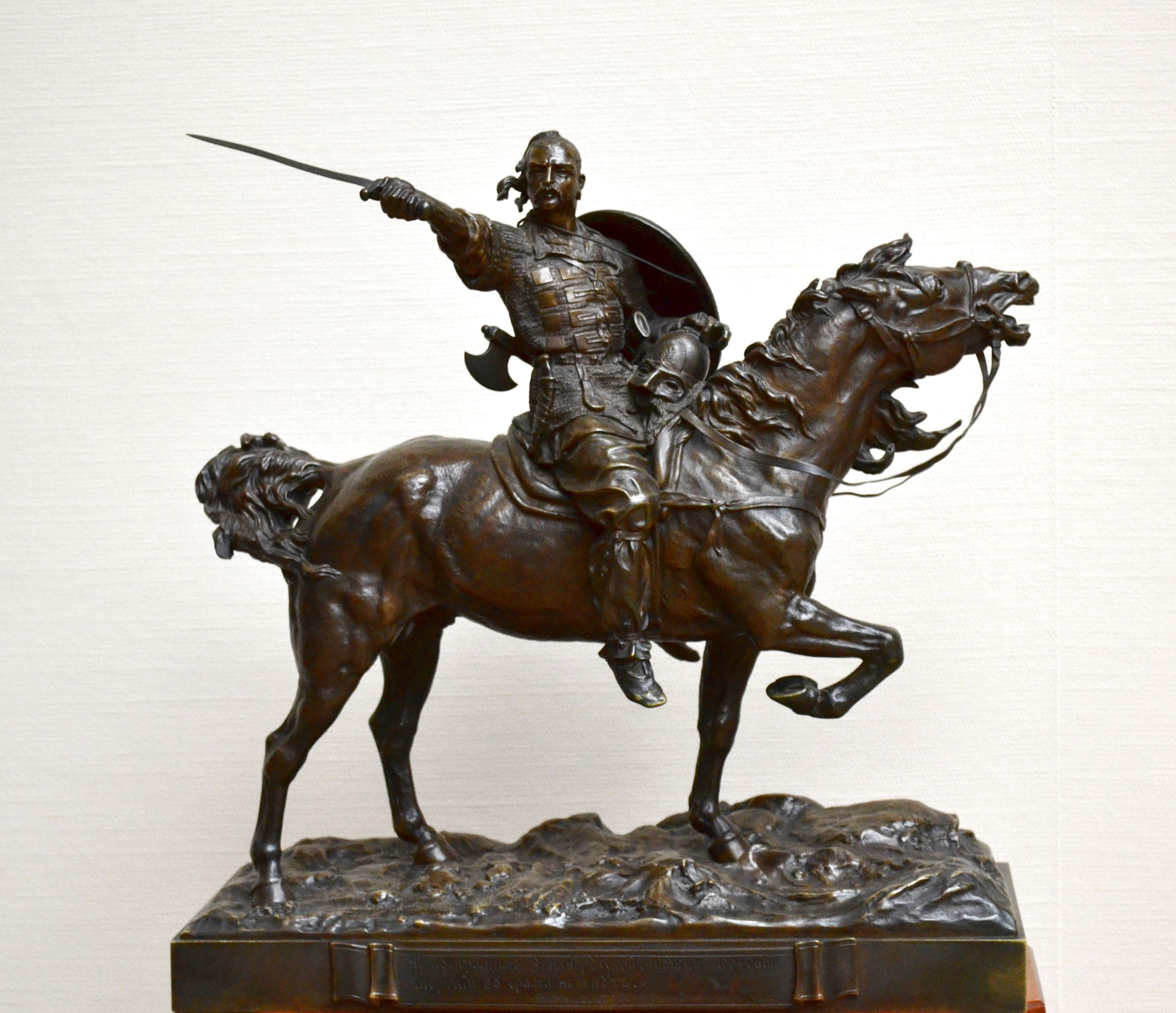
Grand Prince Sviatoslav I (r. 945–972)

Year 968 (CMLXVIII) was a leap year starting on Wednesday of the Julian calendar.

== Events ==
=== By place ===
==== Byzantine Empire ====
- Emperor Nikephoros II receives a Bulgarian embassy led by Prince Boris (the son of Tsar Peter I of Bulgaria), with a plea for help against the invading Kievan Rus'. Nikephoros, occupied in the East, is unable to support him. Instead he sends envoys to summon the Pechenegs to aid Boris. They besiege Kiev, but Grand Prince Sviatoslav I (on campaign in Bulgaria) returns with a Kievan relief force, and defeats the Pechenegs. He drives them out into the Steppe, and sets up viceroys to rule his Rus' territory.

==== Europe ====
- Spring – Emperor Otto I (the Great) travels to Capua to meet there with ambassadors of Nikephoros II, who again reiterate their friendship, but refuse to consent to his dowry demands (see 967). Otto invades the Byzantine Theme of Langobardia with a Lombard expeditionary force. With the assistance of Benevento-Capua and naval support from Pisa, Otto attempts to take Bari by assault, but Byzantine resistance is stiff, and Otto withdraws back to Ravenna.
- Battle of Silistra: A Kievan army (60,000 men) led by Sviatoslav I crosses the Lower Danube and defeats the Bulgarians at Silistra. He occupies most of the Dobruja by seizing 80 fortresses in northeastern Bulgaria. They are looted and destroyed but not permanently occupied. During the winter, Sviatoslav transfers the capital from Kiev to Pereyaslavets.
- Pandulf I (Ironhead), a Lombard prince, takes over the territory of Benevento and Capua after the death of his brother Landulf III. He appoints his son Landulf IV as co-prince of Benevento, and disinherits Pandulf II (a son of Landulf III) as lord of Sant'Agata (located northeast of Naples).
- Battle of Sulcoit in Ireland: The Irish of the Dál gCais led by Brian Boru defeats the Viking forces of Limerick. After the battle the Dál gCais seize and burn the Viking stronghold of Limerick. Ending of Norse expansion in Ireland.

==== Asian ====
- In Vietnam, after ending the anarchy of the 12 warlords, Đinh Bộ Lĩnh declared himself emperor, marking the beginning of the Đinh dynasty.

=== By topic ===
==== Religion ====
- Otto I founds the Archbishopric of Magdeburg at the synod of Ravenna. He appoints Adalbert as the archbishop of Magdeburg. The archbishopric under Adalbert includes the bishoprics of Brandenburg and Havelberg — as well as the newly erected sees of Meissen, Merseburg and Naumburg-Zeitz.
- Mieszko I, duke and prince of Poland, constructs Poznań Cathedral within the fortified stronghold (gord) of Poznań. The settlement becomes a bishopric, Mieszko appoints Jordan as the first bishop.

== Births ==
- November 29 – Kazan, emperor of Japan (d. 1008)
- December 21 – Minamoto no Yorinobu, Japanese samurai (d. 1048)
- December 23 – Zhenzong, emperor of the Song Dynasty (d. 1022)
- Æthelred the Unready, king of England (approximate date)
- Gisela of France, Countess of Ponthieu, French princess and daughter of Hugh Capet (d. 1002)
- Pan, Chinese princess and wife of Zhen Zong (d. 989)
- Romanos III Argyros, emperor of the Byzantine Empire (d. 1034)

== Deaths ==
- March 2 – William, archbishop of Mainz (b. 929)
- March 14 – Matilda of Ringelheim, Frankish queen
- March 19 – Emma of Paris, duchess of Normandy (b. 943)
- April 2 – Yuan Dezhao, Chinese chancellor (b. 891)
- April 4 – Abu Firas al-Hamdani, Arab prince and poet (b. 932)
- Abu al-Misk Kafur, Ikhshidid vizier of Egypt (b. 905)
- Aldred, bishop of Lindisfarne (approximate date)
- Al-Muttaqi, Abbasid caliph (b. 908)
- Ananias I, catholicos of the Armenian Apostolic Church
- Bardas Phokas (the Elder), Byzantine general
- Eadgifu, wife of Edward the Elder (approximate date)
- John III, duke of Naples (approximate date)
- Landulf III, prince of Benevento (or 969)
- Liu Jun, emperor of Northern Han (b. 926)
- Mord Fiddle, Icelandic farmer and law expert
- Mumadona Dias, countess of Portugal
- Rajendravarman II, ruler of the Khmer Empire
- Robert of Vermandois, Frankish nobleman (or 967)
- Sun Guangxian, Chinese chief strategist
- Sunifred II, Frankish nobleman (b. 915)
