= 969 =

Calendar year

969 in various calendars
- Gregorian calendar: 969; CMLXIX
- Ab urbe condita: 1722
- Armenian calendar: 418; ԹՎ ՆԺԸ
- Assyrian calendar: 5719
- Balinese saka calendar: 890–891
- Bengali calendar: 375–376
- Berber calendar: 1919
- Buddhist calendar: 1513
- Burmese calendar: 331
- Byzantine calendar: 6477–6478
- Chinese calendar: 戊辰年 (Earth Dragon); 3666 or 3459 — to — 己巳年 (Earth Snake); 3667 or 3460
- Coptic calendar: 685–686
- Discordian calendar: 2135
- Ethiopian calendar: 961–962
- Hebrew calendar: 4729–4730
- Hindu calendars
- Vikram Samvat: 1025–1026
- Shaka Samvat: 890–891
- Kali Yuga: 4069–4070
- Holocene calendar: 10969
- Iranian calendar: 347–348
- Islamic calendar: 358–359
- Japanese calendar: Anna 2 (安和２年)
- Javanese calendar: 870–871
- Julian calendar: 969; CMLXIX
- Korean calendar: 3302
- Minguo calendar: 943 before ROC 民前943年
- Nanakshahi calendar: −499
- Seleucid era: 1280/1281 AG
- Thai solar calendar: 1511–1512
- Tibetan calendar: ས་ཕོ་འབྲུག་ལོ་ (male Earth-Dragon); 1095 or 714 or −58 — to — ས་མོ་སྦྲུལ་ལོ་ (female Earth-Snake); 1096 or 715 or −57

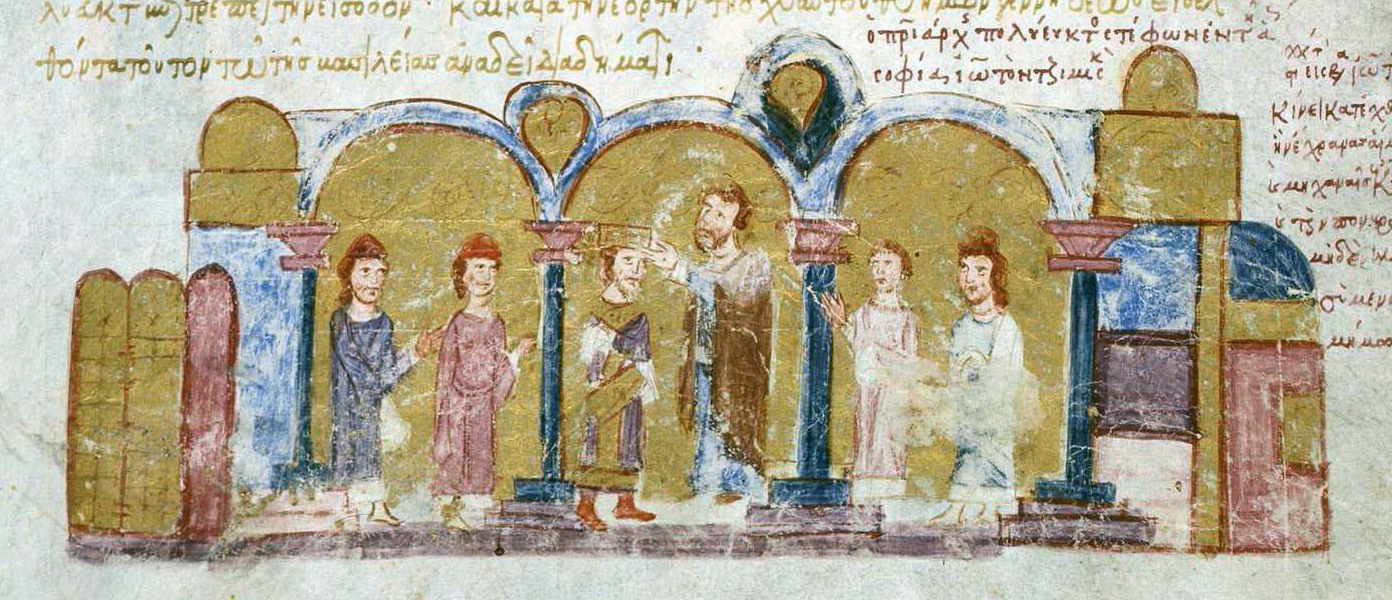
The coronation of John I Tzimiskes (969).

Year 969 (CMLXIX) was a common year starting on Friday of the Julian calendar, the 969th year of the Common Era (CE) and Anno Domini (AD) designations, the 969th year of the 1st millennium, the 69th year of the 10th century, and the 10th and last year of the 960s decade.

== Events ==
=== By place ===
==== Byzantine Empire ====
- October 28 – Siege of Antioch: Byzantine general Michael Bourtzes (during a night attack) seizes part of Antioch's fortifications. The capture of the city from the Hamdanids is completed three days later, when reinforcements under the stratopedarches Peter Phokas arrive. The Byzantine army then moves deeper into Syrian territory — besieging and taking the city of Aleppo.
- December 11 – Emperor Nikephoros II is murdered in the royal palace of Boukoleon at Constantinople after a 6-year reign. Former friends have acted on the instructions of his wife Theophano. Nikephoros is succeeded by his nephew John I Tzimiskes, who becomes co-emperor and regent. He sends Theophano into exile to the island of Prinkipo (Prince Islands).

==== Europe ====
- Peter I, emperor (tsar) of the Bulgarian Empire, suffers a stroke and abdicates the throne in favour of his eldest son Boris II. He arrives (after being an honorary hostage at Constantinople) in Preslav and is proclaimed as the new ruler. Boris regains lost territory from the Kievan Rus' and recaptures Pereyaslavets, an important trade city at the mouth of the Danube.
- Summer – Grand Prince Sviatoslav I invades Bulgaria at the head of a Kievan army, which includes Pecheneg and Hungarian auxiliary forces. He defeats the Bulgarians in a major battle and retakes Pereyaslavets. Boris II capitulates and impales 300 Bulgarian boyars for disloyalty. Sviatoslav assigns garrisons to the conquered fortresses in Northern Bulgaria.
- Pandulf Ironhead, duke of Benevento and Capua, leads the siege of Bovino. He is captured by the Byzantines and taken in chains to Bari, and jailed in Constantinople. Neapolitan forces under Marinus II, duke of Naples, invade Benevento-Capua, capture the city of Avellino and then lay siege to Capua.
- Otto I 'the Great', Holy Roman Emperor, assembles a large expeditionary force at Pavia, joined by Spoletan troops. He counter-attacks, relieves the siege of Capua and devastates the area around Naples. Otto enters Benevento, where he is received as 'liberator' by Landulf IV and in the cities of Apulia (Southern Italy).

==== Africa ====
- February 6–July 9 – Fatimid conquest of Egypt: Caliph Al-Mu'izz's army under General Jawhar invades Egypt. Jawhar occupies the lands around the Nile from the Ikhshidids after a siege at Giza and the capitulation of Fustat.

==== Asia ====
- September 27 – Emperor Reizei abdicates the throne of Japan (due to a mental illness) after a 2-year reign. He is succeeded by his 10-year-old brother En'yū, who becomes the 64th emperor.

=== By topic ===
==== Geography ====
- Ibn Hawqal concludes his travels.

==== Religion ====
- Summer – Pope John XIII convenes a synod at Rome. He raises the bishopric of Benevento to Archbishopric of Benevento. The city is made a metropolitan see over 10 bishoprics in Byzantine Capitanata (Southern Italy).

== Births ==
- Badi' al-Zaman al-Hamadani, Persian poet and writer (d. 1007)
- Hilal al-Sabi', Buyid bureaucrat and historian (d. 1056)
- Judith of Hungary, princess and queen of Poland (d. 988)
- Liu, empress and regent of the Song dynasty (d. 1033)
- Nathar Shah, Tamil mystic and preacher (d. 1039)
- William V 'the Great', duke of Aquitaine (d. 1030)

== Deaths ==
- March 12 – Mu Zong, emperor of the Liao dynasty (b. 931)
- June 26 – George El Mozahem, Egyptian martyr (b. 940)
- July 11 – Olga of Kiev, princess and regent of Russia (b. c. 890)
- September 25 – Burchard, bishop of Meissen (approximate date)
- December 1 – Fujiwara no Morotada, Japanese statesman (b. 920)
- December 11 – Nikephoros II, emperor of the Byzantine Empire
- Dou Zhengu, Chinese official and chancellor of the Tang dynasty (b. 892)
- Landulf III, prince of Benevento and Capua (or 968)
- Michael Krešimir II, king of Croatia (House of Trpimir)
- Nasir al-Dawla, deposed Hamdanid emir of Mosul
