= 967 =

Calendar year

967 in various calendars
- Gregorian calendar: 967; CMLXVII
- Ab urbe condita: 1720
- Armenian calendar: 416; ԹՎ ՆԺԶ
- Assyrian calendar: 5717
- Balinese saka calendar: 888–889
- Bengali calendar: 373–374
- Berber calendar: 1917
- Buddhist calendar: 1511
- Burmese calendar: 329
- Byzantine calendar: 6475–6476
- Chinese calendar: 丙寅年 (Fire Tiger); 3664 or 3457 — to — 丁卯年 (Fire Rabbit); 3665 or 3458
- Coptic calendar: 683–684
- Discordian calendar: 2133
- Ethiopian calendar: 959–960
- Hebrew calendar: 4727–4728
- Hindu calendars
- Vikram Samvat: 1023–1024
- Shaka Samvat: 888–889
- Kali Yuga: 4067–4068
- Holocene calendar: 10967
- Iranian calendar: 345–346
- Islamic calendar: 356–357
- Japanese calendar: Kōhō 4 (康保４年)
- Javanese calendar: 867–868
- Julian calendar: 967; CMLXVII
- Korean calendar: 3300
- Minguo calendar: 945 before ROC 民前945年
- Nanakshahi calendar: −501
- Seleucid era: 1278/1279 AG
- Thai solar calendar: 1509–1510
- Tibetan calendar: མེ་ཕོ་སྟག་ལོ་ (male Fire-Tiger); 1093 or 712 or −60 — to — མེ་མོ་ཡོས་ལོ་ (female Fire-Hare); 1094 or 713 or −59

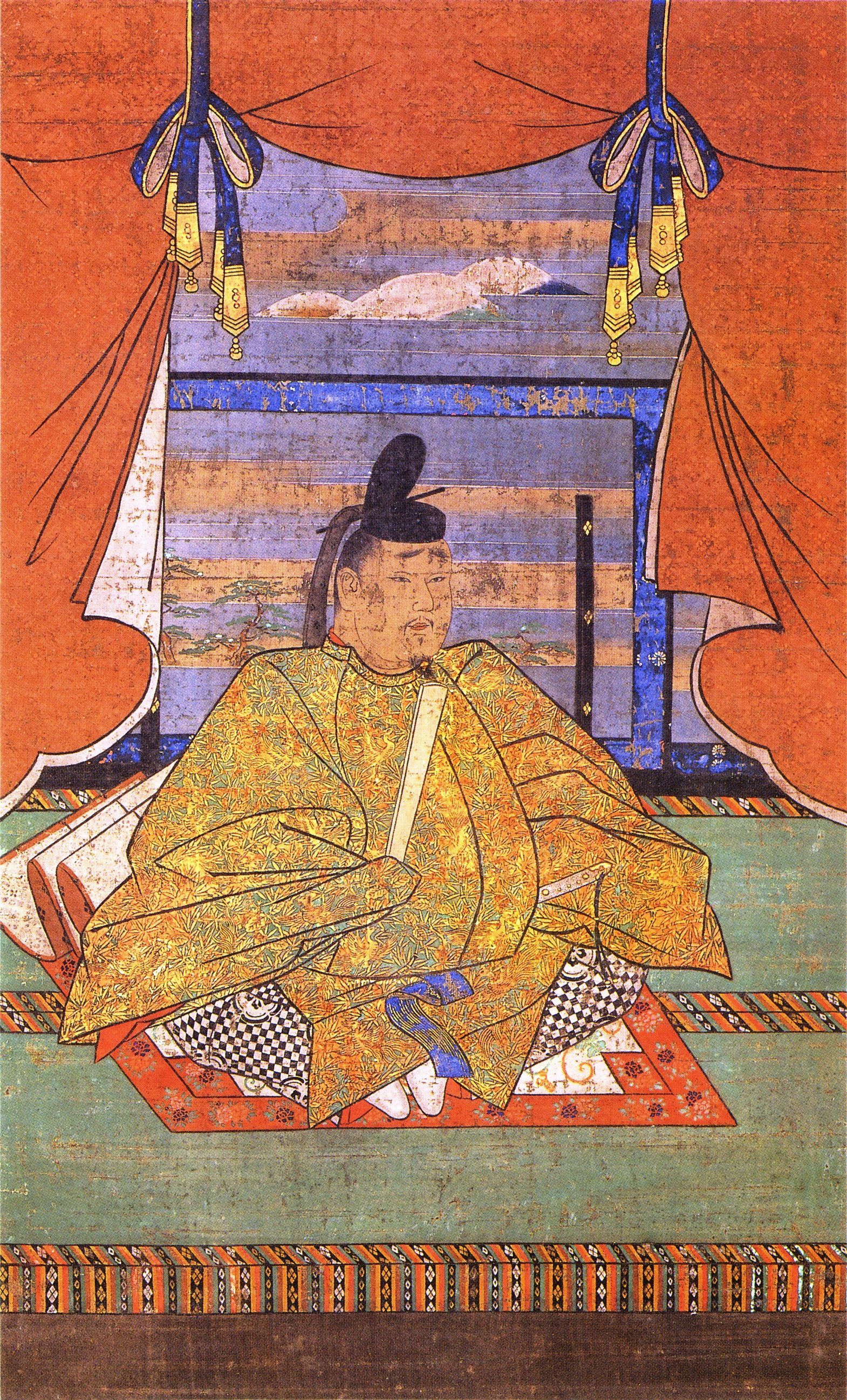
Emperor Murakami (926–967)

Year 967 (CMLXVII) was a common year starting on Tuesday of the Julian calendar.

== Events ==
=== By place ===
==== Europe ====
- Spring – Emperor Otto I (the Great) calls for a council at Rome, to present the new government under Pope John XIII. He asserts his rights in the city, and insists on the occasional presence of an imperial judge, alongside the papal court. The era of Roman independence is over. Grado becomes the patriarchal and metropolitan church of the whole of the Veneto.
- Otto I goes on a tour of the Lombard duchies of southern Italy. In Capua he grants Pandulf I (Ironhead) the vacant Duchy of Spoleto and Camerino and charges him with prosecuting the war against the Byzantine Empire. In Benevento, Otto receives the homage of Pandulf's brother and co-ruler Landulf III. In Salerno he receives also the support of Gisulf I.
- Otto I dispatches an imperial delegation (led by a Venetian named Domenico) to Constantinople with assurances of his friendship and a request for Princess Theophano (a daughter of the late Emperor Romanos II) for his 12-year-old son Otto II. As dowry Otto demands the Byzantine holdings in southern Italy.
- Summer – Sviatoslav I, Grand Prince of Kiev, defeats Bulgar forces in the Balkans at the behest of Emperor Nikephoros II (who pays him 1,500 pounds of gold to invade the Bulgarian Empire).
- The imperial delegation arrives in Macedonia, but goes nowhere with Nikephoros II. Far from offering Byzantine Italy as dowry for Theophano, Nikephoros refuses to accept the claims of Otto I.
- Otto I renews the imperial treaty with Pietro IV Candiano, doge of Venice. He grants him commercial privileges, and protection for Venetian citizens (also the possessions of Venetian bishops).
- Winter – Otto I returns to Rome. On Christmas day, John XIII crowns Otto II as co-emperor of the Holy Roman Empire. Although Otto II is nominated as co-ruler, he exercises no real authority.
- Olaf Tryggvason flees Norway with his mother, only to be attacked by Estonian Vikings (approximate date).

==== Arabian Empire ====
- Emir Nasir al-Dawla is deposed and imprisoned at Mosul after a 32-year reign by his son Abu Taghlib, the de facto governor, and supporters. He becomes the new ruler of the Emirate of Mosul.
- The Fatimid general Jawhar al-Siqilli launches a military campaign in the west of the Maghreb. He resumes his expansion, together with the Zirids, and conquers Fez (modern-day Morocco).

==== Japan ====
- July 5 – Emperor Murakami dies after a 21-year reign. He is succeeded by his 17-year-old son Reizei, who is insane and becomes the 63rd emperor of Japan.

=== By topic ===
==== Religion ====
- Otto I completes and dedicates a new cathedral at Magdeburg in Saxony. Like other imperial churches of the period, it includes a westwork – a structure attached to the entrance wall and outfitted with galleries. Otto makes Magdeburg a base for missionary efforts to convert the Slavs to the east. The patron saint of the city is Mauritius, who, as a military leader fighting for Christianity against pagan armies, shares affinities with Otto himself.
- Re-foundation of Romsey Abbey in Hampshire by King Edgar I (the Peaceful). He appoints Merewenna, an English noblewoman, as abbess who becomes a foster mother to Princess Ælfflæd (a step-daughter of Edgar).
- April 22 – The Cambodian temple Banteay Srei is consecrated and dedicated to the Hindu god Shiva.

== Births ==
- December 7 – Abū-Sa'īd Abul-Khayr, Persian Sufi poet (d. 1049)
- Bolesław I (the Brave), king of Poland (d. 1025)
- Gothelo I, duke of Lorraine (approximate date)
- Lin Bu, Chinese poet and calligrapher (d. 1028)
- Vahram Pahlavouni, prince of Bjni (Armenia) (d. 1045)
- Walter of Speyer, German bishop and poet (d. 1027)

== Deaths ==
- February 9 – Sayf al-Dawla, Hamdanid emir (b. 916)
- April 8 – Mu'izz al-Dawla, Buyid emir (b. 915)
- May 10 – Renaud of Roucy, Viking nobleman
- July 5 – Murakami, emperor of Japan (b. 926)
- September 22 – Wichmann II, Frankish nobleman
- October 20 – Li Yixing, Chinese governor
- Abu al-Faraj al-Isfahani, Umayyad historian (b. 897)
- Abu 'Ali Muhammad ibn Ilyas, Ilyasid emir
- Aleramo di Savona, marquess of Montferrat
- Al-Qabisi, Hamdanid astrologer (approximate date)
- Ashot III, prince of Taron (approximate date)
- Boleslaus I (the Cruel), duke of Bohemia (or 972)
- Dub mac Maíl Coluīm, king of Alba (Scotland)
- Fergal ua Ruairc, king of Connacht (Ireland)
- Hugh II (the Kind), lord of Lusignan
- Krishna III, ruler of the Rashtrakuta Dynasty
- Li Cheng, Chinese painter (b. 919)
- Robert of Vermandois, Frankish nobleman (or 968)
- Vushmgir, Ziyarid emir (approximate date)
- Wahsudan ibn Muhammad, Sallarid emir
- Yan Xu, Chinese chancellor (b. 910)
