= 1022 =

Calendar year

1022 in various calendars
Gregorian calendar	1022; MXXII
Ab urbe condita	1775
Armenian calendar	471; ԹՎ ՆՀԱ
Assyrian calendar	5772
Balinese saka calendar	943–944
Bengali calendar	428–429
Berber calendar	1972
English Regnal year	N/A
Buddhist calendar	1566
Burmese calendar	384
Byzantine calendar	6530–6531
Chinese calendar	辛酉年 (Metal Rooster); 3719 or 3512 — to — 壬戌年 (Water Dog); 3720 or 3513
Coptic calendar	738–739
Discordian calendar	2188
Ethiopian calendar	1014–1015
Hebrew calendar	4782–4783
- Hindu calendars
Vikram Samvat	1078–1079
Shaka Samvat	943–944
Kali Yuga	4122–4123
Holocene calendar	11022
Igbo calendar	22–23
Iranian calendar	400–401
Islamic calendar	412–413
Japanese calendar	Jian 2 (治安２年)
Javanese calendar	924–925
Julian calendar	1022; MXXII
Korean calendar	3355
Minguo calendar	890 before ROC 民前890年
Nanakshahi calendar	−446
Seleucid era	1333/1334 AG
Thai solar calendar	1564–1565
Tibetan calendar	ལྕགས་མོ་བྱ་ལོ་ (female Iron-Bird); 1148 or 767 or −5 — to — ཆུ་ཕོ་ཁྱི་ལོ་ (male Water-Dog); 1149 or 768 or −4

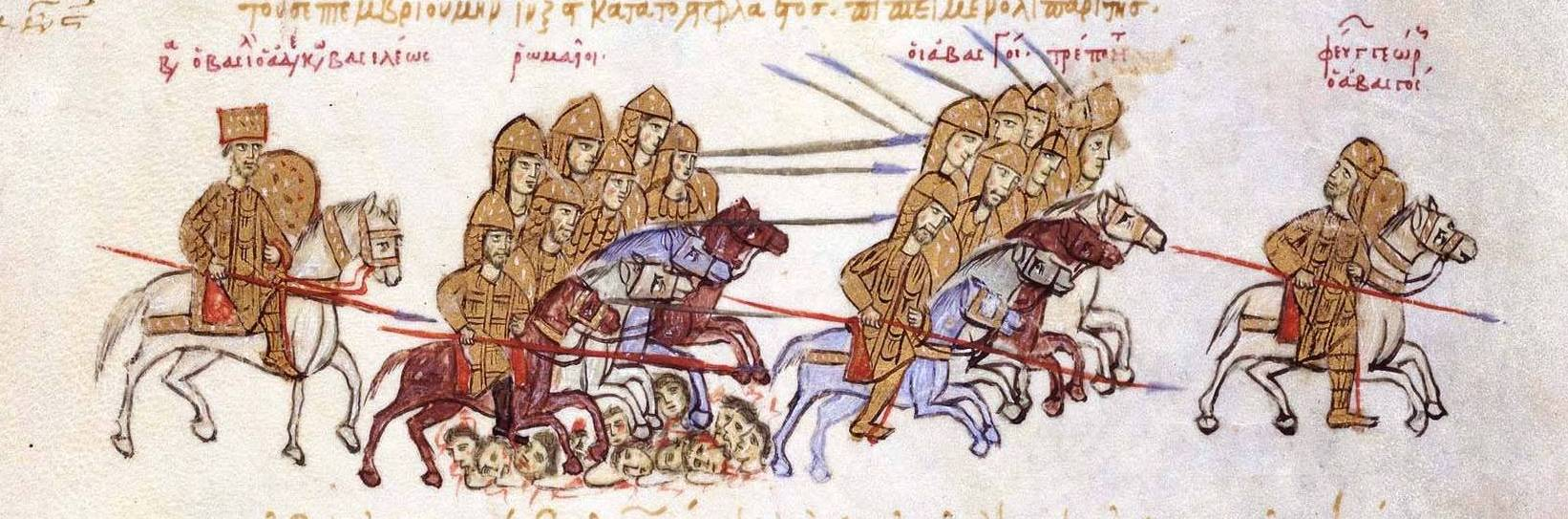
Emperor Basil II defeats the Georgians.

The year 1022 (MXXII) was a common year starting on Monday of the Julian calendar.

== Events ==
=== By place ===
==== Byzantine Empire ====
- Spring – Battle of Svindax: The Byzantine army under Emperor Basil II defeats the Georgians at Svindax (modern Turkey). King George I is forced to negotiate a peace treaty, ending the Byzantine–Georgian wars.
- Summer – Nikephoros Phokas Barytrachelos conspires with the Byzantine general Nikephoros Xiphias against Basil II. The rebellion collapses and Xiphias assassinates Phokas.

==== Europe ====
- Spring – Emperor Henry II divides his army into three columns and descends through Rome onto Capua after the Lombard states of Southern Italy had switched their allegiance to the Byzantinians in the wake of the battle of Cannae four years earlier. The bulk of the expeditionary force (20,000 men) led by Henry, makes its way down the Adriatic coast.
- Pilgrim, archbishop of Cologne, marches with his army down the Tyrrhenian coast to lay siege to Capua. The citizens open the gates and surrender the city to the imperial army.
- Pilgrim besieges the city of Salerno for forty days. Prince Guaimar III offers to give hostages – Pilgrim accepts the prince's son and co-prince Guaimar IV, and lifts the siege.
- Summer – Outbreak of the plague among the German troops forces Henry II to abandon his campaign in Italy. He reimposes his suzerainty on the Lombard principalities.
- King Olof Skötkonung dies and is succeeded by his son Anund Jakob as ruler of Sweden. He becomes the second Christian king of the Swedish realm.

==== Africa ====
- The 14-year-old Al-Mu'izz ibn Badis, with support of the Zirid nobles, takes over the government and (as a minor) ascends to the throne in Ifriqiya (modern Tunisia).

==== Asia ====
- The Chinese military has one million registered soldiers during the Song Dynasty, an increase since the turn of the 11th century (approximate date).

=== By topic ===
==== Religion ====
- After the Council of Orléans, King Robert II of France burns thirteen heretics at Orléans. These are the first burning victims for heresy.
- Pope Benedict VIII convenes a synod at Pavia. He issues decrees to restrain simony and incontinence of the clergy.
- Æthelnoth, archbishop of Canterbury, travels to Rome to obtain the pallium. He is received by Benedict VIII.

== Births ==
- Fujiwara no Nobunaga, Japanese nobleman (d. 1094)
- Harold II, king of England (approximate date)
- Manasses III, French nobleman (d. 1065)
- Michael Attaleiates, Byzantine historian (d. 1080)
- Ordulf, duke of Saxony (approximate date)
- Rajaraja Narendra, Indian ruler (d. 1061)

== Deaths ==
- March 12 – Symeon the New Theologian, Byzantine monk (b. 949)
- March 23 – Zhen Zong, emperor of the Song Dynasty (b. 968)
- March 30 – Atenulf, Italian nobleman and Benedictine abbot
- June 28 – Notker III, German Benedictine monk and writer
- July 23 – Lei Yungong, Chinese palace eunuch and adviser
- August 15 – Nikephoros Phokas, Byzantine aristocrat
- September 2 – Máel Sechnaill II, High King of Ireland
- November 20 – Bernward, bishop of Hildesheim
- December 2 – Elvira Menéndez, queen of León
- Al-Shaykh Al-Mufid, Twelver Shia theologian
- Arikesarin, Indian ruler of the Shilahara Dynasty
- Aziz al-Dawla, Fatimid governor of Aleppo
- Konstantin Dobrynich, mayor of Novgorod
- Moninho Viegas, French knight (b. 950)
- Olof Skötkonung, king of Sweden
- Rededya, leader of the Kassogians
- Sidi Mahrez, Tunisian scholar (b. 951)
