= Ilganii =

Ilganii may refer to one of two places in Tulcea County, Romania:

- Ilganii de Jos, a village in Nufăru Commune
- Ilganii de Sus, a village in Maliuc Commune
