= Guibert of Gembloux =

Guibert of Gembloux may refer to:

- Wicbert or Guibert (died 962), saint and founder of Gembloux Abbey
- Guibert (abbot of Gembloux and Florennes) (died 1208), secretary to Hildegard of Bingen
