= Nufăru =

- Commune
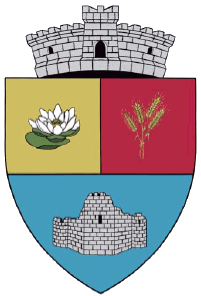
- Coat of arms

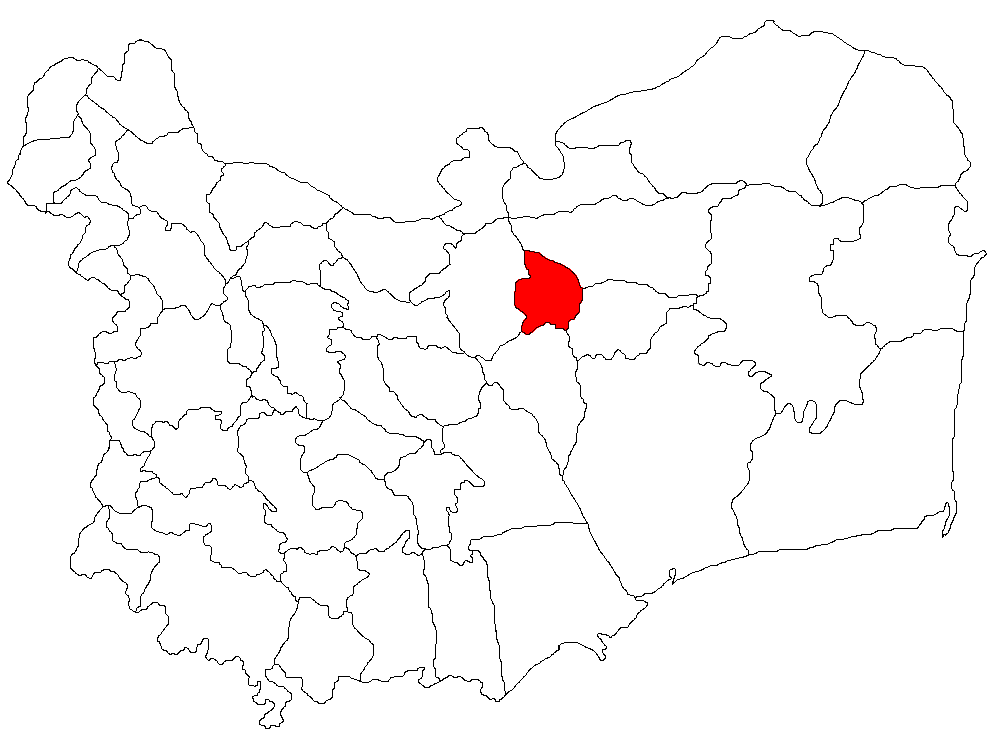
- Location in Tulcea County

- Location in Romania
- Coordinates: 45°09′N 28°55′E
- Country: Romania
- County: Tulcea
- Subdivisions: Ilganii de Jos, Malcoci, Nufăru, Victoria

Government
  - Mayor (2020–2024): Ciprian Solomencu (PSD)
- Area: 57.67 km^{2} (22.27 sq mi)
- Population (2021-12-01): 2,644
  - Density: 46/km^{2} (120/sq mi)
- Time zone: EET/EEST (UTC+2/+3)
- Vehicle reg.: TL
- Website: primarianufaru.ro

Nufăru is a commune in Tulcea County, Northern Dobruja, Romania, thought to be the short-lived ancient capital of Kievan Rus, Pereyaslavets, and called Prislav until 1968. It is composed of four villages: Ilganii de Jos, Malcoci, Nufăru and Victoria (formerly Pârlita).
