= Ælfflæd =

Ælfflæd is a name of Anglo-Saxon England meaning Ælf (Elf) and flæd (beauty). It may refer to:

- Saint Ælfflæd of Whitby (654–714)
- Ælfflæd of Mercia, daughter of Offa, wife of King Æthelred I of Northumbria
- Ælfflæd, wife of Edward the Elder, mother of Ælfweard and Edwin
- Ælfflæd, daughter of Edgar the Peaceful
- Aelfled of Bernicia
- Ælfflæd of Mercia (II), daughter of Ceolwulf I of Mercia, wife of Wigmund of Mercia, mother of Wigstan of Mercia

== See also ==
- Æthelflæd (name)
