= Guibert (abbot of Gembloux and Florennes) =

Benedictine monk (c. 1125–1208)

Guibert of Gembloux was a Benedictine monk who served as secretary to Hildegard of Bingen. He later became abbot of Gembloux Abbey in the province of Namur, Belgium.

== Life ==
Guibert was born about the year 1125, in Brabant and was probably educated at the abbey school of Gembloux. He lived for some time in the abbey of St. Martin. Around 1176, Guibert began a correspondence with Hildegard of Bingen. Guibert was invited to be Hildegard’s secretary in 1177. His abbot was reluctant to approve this, but Abbot Philippe of Park Abbey facilitated the move. Guibert relocated to Rupertsberg where he remained until shortly after Hildegard’s death in 1179. Besides working with Hildegard, he also served as priest for the nuns of the abbey.

In 1180, he met the poet Joseph of Exeter, who was studying in Jodoigne. Some of their correspondence still survives. In 1185 a dispute arose between the Count of Namur and Baldwin V, Count of Hainaut. Namur laid siege to Gembloux and a fire broke out in the monastery, destroying nearly all of Guibert's works. Guibert had a particular devotion to St. Martin of Tours. After the fire, he spent about a year in Tours reconstructing a manuscript vita that had been lost in the fire.

Guibert was elected abbot of Florennes (1188–1190). In 1194, he was placed at the head of the monastery of Gembloux; which communities he administered in wisdom, but resigned around 1204 and withdrew to Florennes to continue his writing. He died February 22, 1208.

He wrote numerous works, e.g., a poem on St. Martin, a Life of St. Hildegard, and several Letters, of which the majority have been published. His correspondence provides a chronology of the later years of Hildegard's life, the history of Gembloux, and the churches of Tours, among other subjects.
