= Council of Orléans (1022) =

The Council of Orleans held in 1022 was a Council of Roman Catholic Church bishops held in the city of Orléans, France. The council was held in Orleans in 1022 to fight heretics in the context of the case of the heresy of Orléans. It was held in the presence of King Robert II and his wife Constance of Arles

A second council took place in June 1029, on the occasion of the dedication of the church of Saint-Aignan, Orléans under Robert II.
