= Æthelflæd (name) =

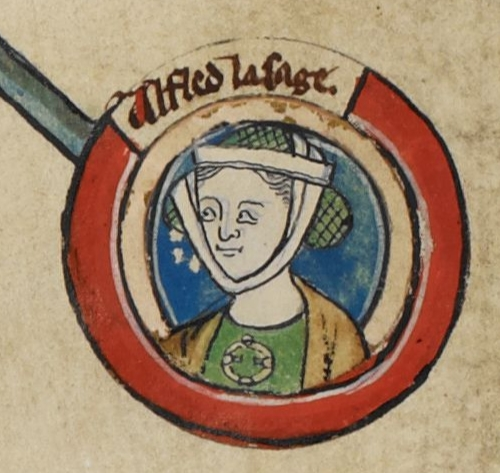
Medieval miniature of Æthelflæd in Genealogical roll of the kings of England.

Æthelflæd /ˈæθəlflæd/ is an Anglo-Saxon female name.

== Etymology ==
Like most Germanic names, the name is composed of two Old English stems: Æthel-, meaning "noble", from Proto-Germanic *aþal (compare Dutch edel "noble" and adel "nobility") and flæd, from Proto-Germanic *flataz, meaning "flat, smooth, even textured"; and can be figuratively be translated as "noble beauty" or "nobly featured". The name Audofleda, borne by the sister of Clovis I and wife of Theodoric the Great, is a Latinisation of a similar, otherwise unattested, Old Frankish variant.

== People ==
- Æthelflæd, Lady of the Mercians, daughter of Alfred the Great
- Æthelflæd of Damerham, queen of England, second wife of King Edmund
- Æthelflæd Eneda, first wife of King Edgar and mother of Edward the Martyr
- Æthelflæda of Romsey, 11th century abbess
