= Orléans heresy =

11th-century French religious movement

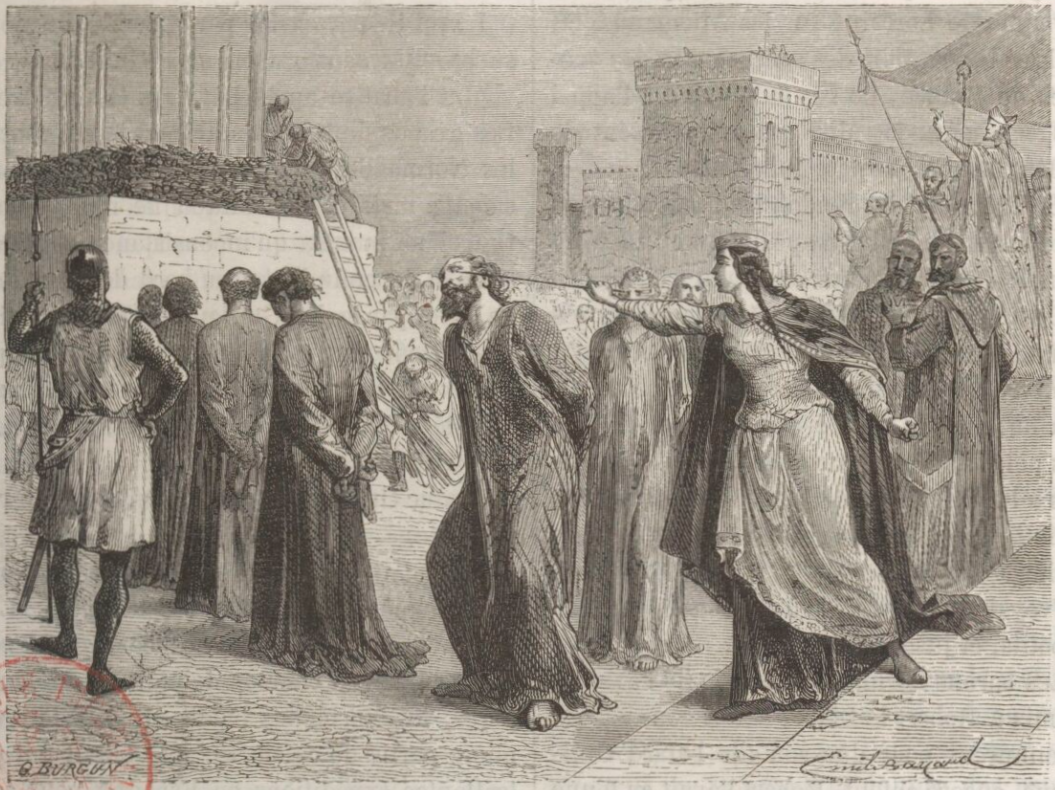
Illustration of the execution of the heretics in Orléans in 1022 (Émile Bayard, 1860s)

The Orléans heresy in 1022 was an early instance of heresy in Europe. The small heretical sect at the center of the event had coalesced around two canons, Stephen and Lisios, who expressed ascetic and possibly dualist beliefs. The sect leaders and their followers were tried and condemned by the Council of Orléans, excommunicated and "all but two members were locked in a cottage outside the city walls and burned alive."(A History of Medieval Heresy and Inquisition p 19). This is believed to be the first recorded execution by burning for the crime of heresy in the medieval West.

Contemporary sources describe the sect's beliefs and practices as including asceticism, celibacy, vegetarianism, missionary activity, the rejection of all church sacraments and denial of the doctrines of the resurrection and the virgin birth. These accounts, however, also conflict with each other and include embellishments rooted in sensational accounts recorded by early Church Fathers. Included in these is Adémar de Chabannes, writing shortly after the events in 1028, who mentions a Eucharist made of human ashes, sex orgies, spitting on the cross and Devil worship, and Paul of Saint-Père de Chartres, writing nearly 50 years later, who described secret, nighttime ceremonies and the appearance of Satan. These accusations bear striking similarities to claims made against a variety of other groups throughout history including Jews, the Knights Templar, witches, and early Christians by the Roman authorities.

Unlike other heresies, the Orléans heresy may have been driven by erudite clergy who were aligned with the Queen of France in opposition to the king and the Count of Blois. It was documented by contemporary observers.
