= Murighiol =

- Commune
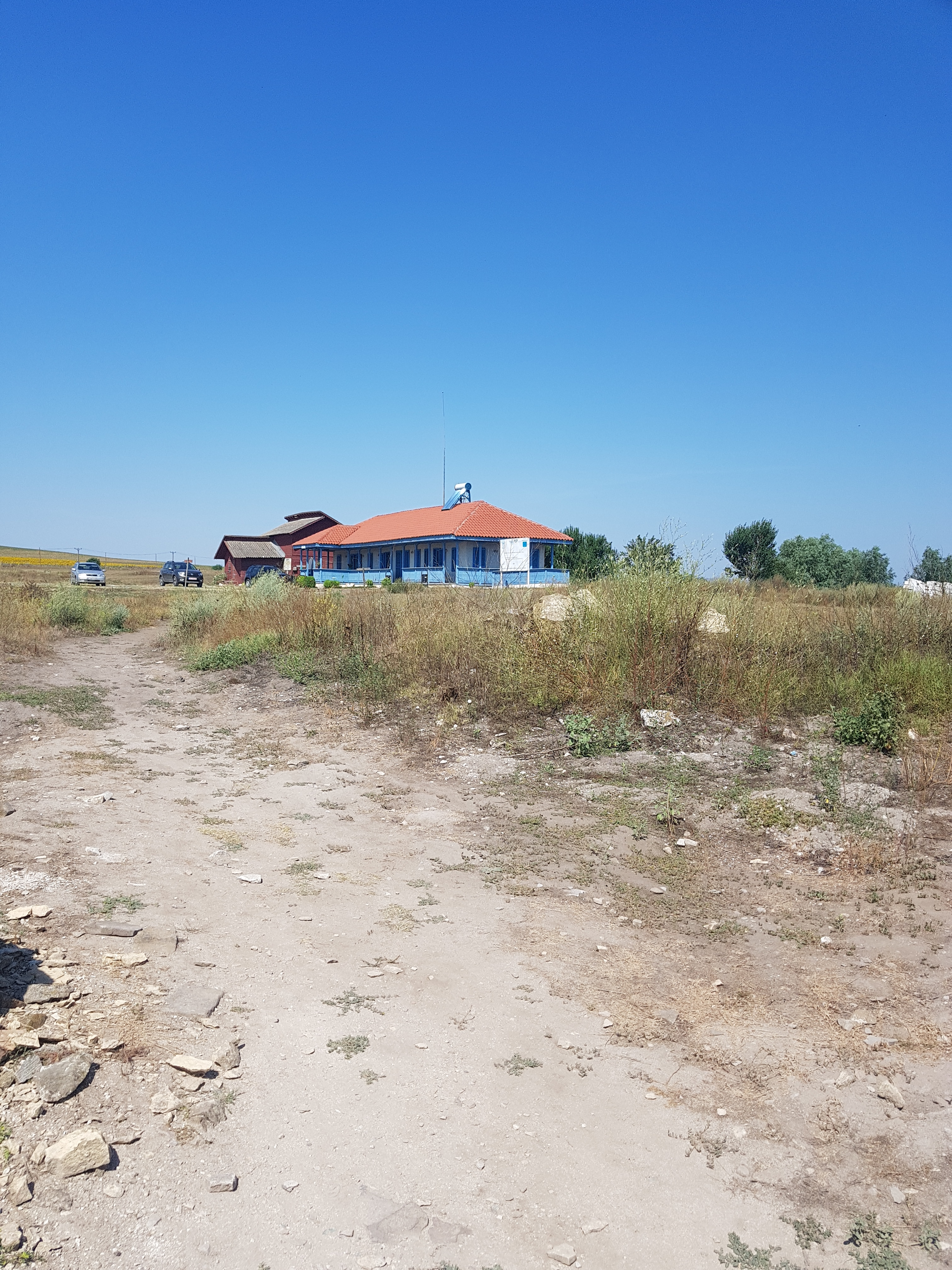

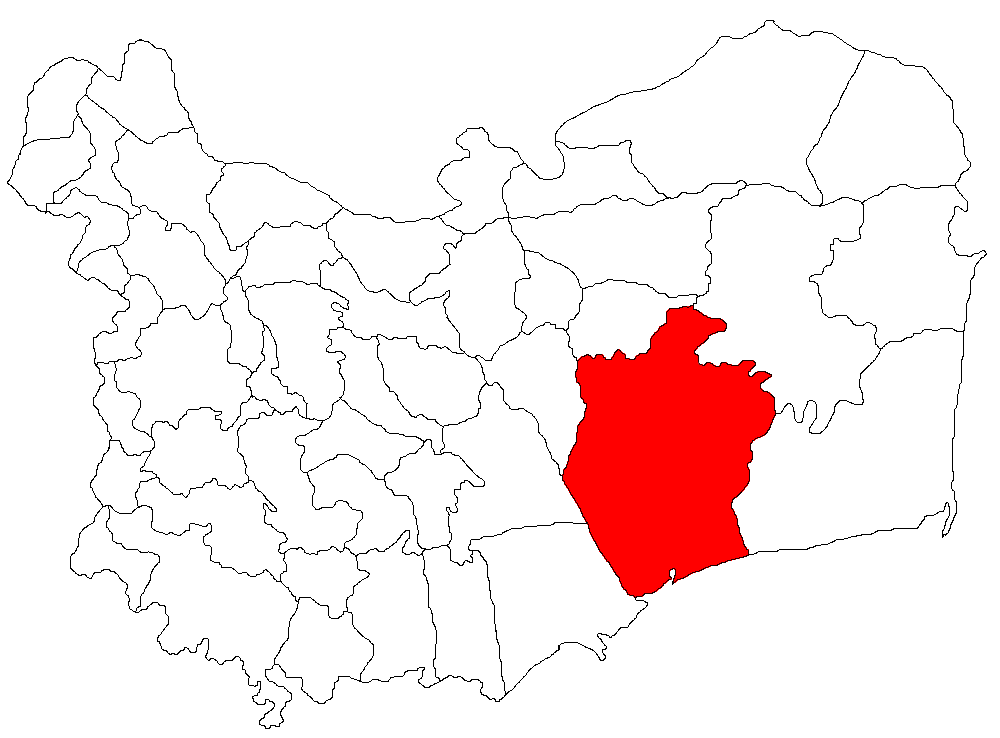
- Location in Tulcea County

- Location in Romania
- Coordinates: 45°02′N 29°10′E
- Country: Romania
- County: Tulcea
- Subdivisions: Murighiol, Colina, Dunavățu de Jos, Dunavățu de Sus, Murighiol, Plopul, Sarinasuf, Uzlina

Government
  - Mayor (2024–2028): Alexandru Ignat (PSD)
- Area: 804.49 km^{2} (310.62 sq mi)
- Elevation: 11 m (36 ft)
- Population (2021-12-01): 2,959
  - Density: 3.678/km^{2} (9.526/sq mi)
- Time zone: UTC+02:00 (EET)
  - Summer (DST): UTC+03:00 (EEST)
- Postal code: 827150
- Area code: +40 x40
- Vehicle reg.: TL
- Website: primaria-murighiol.ro

Murighiol (Independența from 1983 to 1996) is a commune in Tulcea County, Northern Dobruja, Romania. It is composed of seven villages:

- Murighiol
- Plopul (formerly Beibudzac)
- Colina (Russian: Калина)
- Dunavățu de Jos (Russian: Долни Дунавец)
- Dunavățu de Sus (Russian: Горни Дунавец)
- Sarinasuf
- Uzlina

The commune lies in the southeastern part of the county, on the southern side of the Danube Delta. It covers an area of 804.49 km^{2} (310.62 sq mi), bordered to the north by the Sfântu Gheorghe branch of the Danube, Lake Razelm to the west, and the Black Sea to the south.

At the 2011 census, 94.6% of the inhabitants were Romanians, 4.5% Ukrainians, and 0.4% Turks.

The commune's name is of Turkish origin: moru ("violet") and göl ("lake") compounded to mean "violet lake".

The archaeological site of Halmyris is located near the village of Murighiol. Halmyris was a Roman legionary fort from the 1st–4th centuries CE. It is currently under excavation.
