= 916 =

Calendar year

916 in various calendars
- Gregorian calendar: 916; CMXVI
- Ab urbe condita: 1669
- Armenian calendar: 365; ԹՎ ՅԿԵ
- Assyrian calendar: 5666
- Balinese saka calendar: 837–838
- Bengali calendar: 322–323
- Berber calendar: 1866
- Buddhist calendar: 1460
- Burmese calendar: 278
- Byzantine calendar: 6424–6425
- Chinese calendar: 乙亥年 (Wood Pig); 3613 or 3406 — to — 丙子年 (Fire Rat); 3614 or 3407
- Coptic calendar: 632–633
- Discordian calendar: 2082
- Ethiopian calendar: 908–909
- Hebrew calendar: 4676–4677
- Hindu calendars
- Vikram Samvat: 972–973
- Shaka Samvat: 837–838
- Kali Yuga: 4016–4017
- Holocene calendar: 10916
- Iranian calendar: 294–295
- Islamic calendar: 303–304
- Japanese calendar: Engi 16 (延喜１６年)
- Javanese calendar: 815–816
- Julian calendar: 916; CMXVI
- Korean calendar: 3249
- Minguo calendar: 996 before ROC 民前996年
- Nanakshahi calendar: −552
- Seleucid era: 1227/1228 AG
- Thai solar calendar: 1458–1459
- Tibetan calendar: ཤིང་མོ་ཕག་ལོ་ (female Wood-Boar); 1042 or 661 or −111 — to — མེ་ཕོ་བྱི་བ་ལོ་ (male Fire-Rat); 1043 or 662 or −110

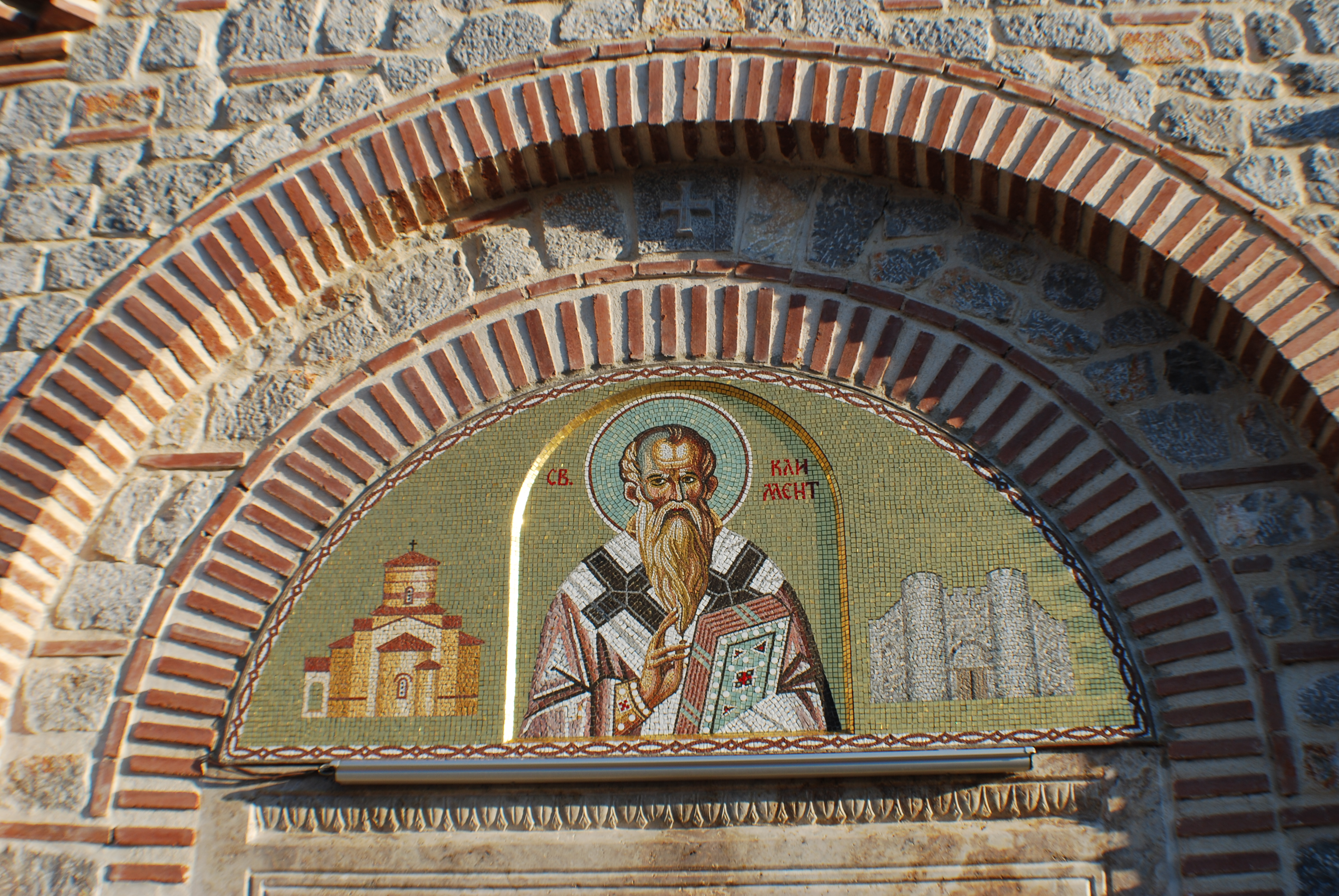
Mosaic of Clement of Ohrid (ca. 840–916)

Year 916 (CMXVI) was a leap year starting on Monday of the Julian calendar.

== Events ==
=== By place ===
==== Europe ====
- Sicilian Berbers in Agrigento revolt and depose the independent Emir Ahmed ibn Khorob. They offer Sicily to the Fatimid Caliphate in Ifriqiya (modern Tunisia). Caliph Abdullah al-Mahdi Billah welcomes this turn of events, but refuses to grant the Berber rulers their autonomy. He sends a Fatimid expeditionary force under Abu Said Musa which lands in Sicily and, with some difficulty, takes control of the island. Abdullah al-Mahdi Billah appoints Salam ibn Rashid as the emir of Sicily. Ahmed ibn Khorob is dispatched to Raqqada and executed.

==== Britain ====
- Lady Æthelflæd, daughter of the late King Alfred the Great and the widow of Earl Æthelred of Mercia, sends an army into Brycheiniog to avenge the murder of the Mercian abbot Ecbryht and his companions. They seize and burn the royal fort of King Tewdr of Brycheiniog at Llangorse Lake (Wales), and take the queen and thirty-three others captive.

==== Asia ====
- Abaoji, Khitan ruler and founder of the Liao Dynasty, adopts Chinese court formalities in which he declares himself emperor in the Chinese style and adopts an era name, Taizu of Liao. He names his eldest son Yelü Bei as heir apparent, a first in the history of the Khitan. Abaoji leads a campaign in the west, conquering much of the Mongolian Plains.

=== By topic ===
==== Religion ====
- Clement of Ohrid, Bulgarian scholar, writer and enlightener of the Slavs, dies. He is regarded as the first bishop of the Bulgarian Orthodox Church and the founder of the first Slavic Literary School. Clement is buried in his monastery, Saint Panteleimon, in Ohrid (modern North Macedonia).

== Births ==
- June 22 – ySayf al-Dawla, Hamdanid emir (d. 967)
- Theodoric I, German nobleman (approximate date)
- Yuan Zong, emperor of Southern Tang (d. 961)

== Deaths ==
- March 27 – Alduin I, Frankish nobleman
- May 25 – Flann Sinna, king of Meath
- Anarawd ap Rhodri, king of Gwynedd
- Bencion, Frankish nobleman
- Clement of Ohrid, Bulgarian scholar
- Ge Congzhou, Chinese general
- Mór ingen Cearbhaill, queen of Laigin
- Tighearnach ua Cleirigh, king of Aidhne
- Theodora, Roman politician
- Theodoric I, bishop of Paderborn
- Ziyadat Allah III, Aghlabid emir
