= 915 =

Calendar year

915 in various calendars
Gregorian calendar	915; CMXV
Ab urbe condita	1668
Armenian calendar	364; ԹՎ ՅԿԴ
Assyrian calendar	5665
Balinese saka calendar	836–837
Bengali calendar	321–322
Berber calendar	1865
Buddhist calendar	1459
Burmese calendar	277
Byzantine calendar	6423–6424
Chinese calendar	甲戌年 (Wood Dog); 3612 or 3405 — to — 乙亥年 (Wood Pig); 3613 or 3406
Coptic calendar	631–632
Discordian calendar	2081
Ethiopian calendar	907–908
Hebrew calendar	4675–4676
- Hindu calendars
Vikram Samvat	971–972
Shaka Samvat	836–837
Kali Yuga	4015–4016
Holocene calendar	10915
Iranian calendar	293–294
Islamic calendar	302–303
Japanese calendar	Engi 15 (延喜１５年)
Javanese calendar	814–815
Julian calendar	915; CMXV
Korean calendar	3248
Minguo calendar	997 before ROC 民前997年
Nanakshahi calendar	−553
Seleucid era	1226/1227 AG
Thai solar calendar	1457–1458
Tibetan calendar	ཤིང་ཕོ་ཁྱི་ལོ་ (male Wood-Dog); 1041 or 660 or −112 — to — ཤིང་མོ་ཕག་ལོ་ (female Wood-Boar); 1042 or 661 or −111

Year 915 (CMXV) was a common year starting on Sunday of the Julian calendar.

== Events ==
=== By place ===
==== Europe ====
- Summer – Battle of Garigliano: The Christian League, personally led by Pope John X, lays siege to Garigliano (a fortified Arab camp in the area of Minturno), which is blockaded from the sea by the Byzantine navy. After three months of siege, plagued by hunger, the Saracens decide to break out of Garigliano and find their way back to Sicily by any means possible. Christian hunting parties fall on the fleeing Arabs, and all are captured and executed.
- July – The Magyars (Hungarians), led by Zoltán, only son of the late Grand Prince Árpád, attack Swabia, Franconia and Saxony. Small units penetrate as far as Bremen, burning the city.

=== By topic ===
==== Religion ====
- December 3 – John X crowns the Italian sovereign Berengar I as the Holy Roman Emperor in Rome. Berengar returns to northern Italy, where Friuli is threatened by the Hungarians.

== Births ==
- January 13 – Al-Hakam II, Umayyad caliph (d. 976)
- Abu Shakur Balkhi, Persian poet
- Adalbert I, Frankish nobleman (approximate date)
- Al-Mutanabbi, Muslim poet (d. 965)
- Boleslaus I, duke of Bohemia (approximate date)
- Burchard III, Frankish nobleman (d. 973)
- Hasdai ibn Shaprut, Jewish diplomat (d. 970)
- Sunifred II, Frankish nobleman (d. 968)
- William III, Frankish nobleman (d. 963)

== Deaths ==
- April 23 – Yang Shihou, Chinese general
- November 4 – Zhang, Chinese empress (b. 892)
- Abu Salih Mansur, Samanid governor
- Adalbert II, Lombard nobleman
- Al-Nasa'i, Muslim scholar and hadith compiler
- Bi'dah al-Kabirah, was a songstress, and had been a slave of Arib. She died on 10 July 915. Abu Bakr ibn al-Muhtadi led the funeral prayers. She was also concubine of Abbasid caliph Al-Mamūn (r. 813–833)
- Bertila of Spoleto, queen of Italy
- Cutheard, bishop of Lindisfarne
- Domnall mac Áeda, king of Ailech (Ireland)
- Gonzalo Fernandez, count of Castile
- Gregory IV, duke of Naples
- Jing Hao, Chinese painter
- Leoluca, Sicilian abbot (approximate date)
- Li Yanlu, Chinese warlord
- Ratbod, archbishop of Trier
- Reginar I, Frankish nobleman
- Regino of Prüm, German abbot
- Spytihněv I, duke of Bohemia
- Sunyer II, Frankish nobleman
- Tuotilo, German composer (approximate date)
