= Mord Fiddle =

Icelandic law expert and farmer

Mord Sighvatsson (c. 900–968; Old Norse: Morðr Sighvatsson [ˈmorðz̠ ˈsiɣˌxwɑtsˌson]; Modern Icelandic: Morður Sighvatsson [ˈmɔrðʏr ˈsɪɣˌkʰvatsˌsɔːn]), better known as Mord "Fiddle" (O.N.: Morðr Gígja [ˈɡiːɣjɑ]; M.I.: Morður Gígja [ˈciːja]) was a wealthy Icelandic farmer and expert on Icelandic law who lived during the late Settlement Period and early Commonwealth Period. According to Njals Saga, he was the son of Sighvat the Red, but Landnámabók asserts that Mord was Sighvat's grandson. Mord was the father of Unn Mordardottir, who for a time was married to Hrútr Herjólfsson.

Gunnhild, Mother of Kings, the mother of Harald II of Norway and his brothers and Queen Mother of Norway, had been Hrútr's patron and lover while he sojourned in that land. When Hrútr returned home, Gunnhild gave him many presents, but she cursed Hrútr with priapism to ruin his marriage to Unn. It was Mord who masterminded Unn's divorce from Hrútr by advising her on procedures she could use to name witnesses and announce the divorce while Hrut was away.
