= Burning of Luimneach =

968 incident

Burning of Luimnech
Date	968
Location	Limerick, Ireland
Result	Irish victory

Belligerents
Kingdom of Limerick	Dalcassians

Commanders and leaders
(Unknown)	Brian Boru; Mahon

Strength
Very few	300

Casualties and losses
All either captured or killed	None

The Burning of Luimneach was the looting and destruction of the Viking stronghold of Limerick (Luimneach) by the Irish Dál gCais tribe of Munster. The Dál gCais were led by the two warrior brothers, Brian Boru and Mathgamain mac Cennétig while the Vikings had no type of official leadership. The king of the Vikings, Ivar of Limerick, and his troops had scattered into the woods of Tipperary a few hours before after a crushing defeat at the Battle of Sulcoit. The Cogad Gáedel re Gallaib quotes that "[e]very one of them that was fit for war was killed, and every one that was fit for a slave was enslaved."

== Background ==
Only a few hours before the Burning of Luimneach at the Battle of Sulcoit, the Vikings, led by Ivar of Limerick, were routed by the Dál gCais tribe of Munster. The Battle of Sulcoit was noted by Brian Boru and Mathgamain mac Cennétig as a total loss for the Vikings and was called the first great loss the Vikings of Limerick had faced. At Sulcoit many Vikings were killed by the Dál gCais and by mid day fled into the woods in Tipperary. This left the city of Limerick vulnerable attack by the Dál gCais.

== Burning of Limerick ==
Near night time after the Battle of Sulcoit, Brian Boru's army of about 300 men attacked Limerick. The Dál gCais looted every type of structure in the city and burned it when they were done. Every structure in the city was either looted or burned to the ground. Brian Boru considered this payback against the Vikings because of his father's death at the hands of the Vikings. Anything with any type of value was stolen and any type of item with no value was either destroyed or burned. Brian's army killed every man in the village that was fit for battle and every woman and child was enslaved. By nightfall, every building in Limerick was reduced to smoke and ash and every person was either killed or enslaved by the Dál gCais.
