= Pereyaslavets =

Medieval Bulgarian trade city on the mouth of the Danube River

Coordinates: 45°09′N 28°55′E

Pereyaslavets (East Slavic: Переяславец) or Preslavets (Bulgarian: Преславец) was a trade city located near mouths of the Danube. The city's name is derived from that of the Bulgarian capital of the time, Preslav, and means Little Preslav (Medieval Greek: Μικρᾶ Πρεσθλάβα). In Greek it was also known as Presthlavitza (Πρεσθλάβιτζα). Several theories exist regarding the exact location of the city: either at Preslav or in its vicinity in Bulgaria, or at Isaccea, Nufăru, Murighiol or Jurilovca in Romania.

A thriving trade centre of the First Bulgarian Empire, it was captured by Prince Svyatoslav of Kievan Rus in 968 (See Sviatoslav's invasion of Bulgaria). During Svyatoslav's absence from the city following the Siege of Kiev (968), part of the citizens revolted and opened the gate to Bulgarian forces. According to Vasily Tatischev, Svyatoslav's governor Volk managed to escape.

Upon his return to Bulgaria, Svyatoslav promptly suppressed the rebellion and, to the chagrin of his mother and relatives, transferred the capital from Kiev to Pereyaslavets. According to the Primary Chronicle (its record for year 969), Svyatoslav explained to his courtiers that it was to Pereyaslavets, the centre of his lands, that "all the riches would flow: gold, silks, wine, and various fruits from Greece, silver and horses from Hungary and Bohemia, and from Ruthenia furs, wax, honey, and ancient laws". Two years later, the town fell to the Byzantines, who had launched their own invasion of Bulgaria, and became the seat of a Byzantine strategos.

Excavations have identified a late 10th century Byzantine fortress at the village of Nufăru, Romania (known as Prislav until 1968), on the Sfântu Gheorghe branch of the Danube, just 11 km east of Tulcea, which may indicate it was the location of the Presthlavitza mentioned in Byzantine source.

== See also ==
- Pereiaslav, named so in the Rus'–Byzantine Treaty (911) to distinguish it from Pereyaslavets
