= 882 =

Calendar year

882 in various calendars
- Gregorian calendar: 882; DCCCLXXXII
- Ab urbe condita: 1635
- Armenian calendar: 331; ԹՎ ՅԼԱ
- Assyrian calendar: 5632
- Balinese saka calendar: 803–804
- Bengali calendar: 288–289
- Berber calendar: 1832
- Buddhist calendar: 1426
- Burmese calendar: 244
- Byzantine calendar: 6390–6391
- Chinese calendar: 辛丑年 (Metal Ox); 3579 or 3372 — to — 壬寅年 (Water Tiger); 3580 or 3373
- Coptic calendar: 598–599
- Discordian calendar: 2048
- Ethiopian calendar: 874–875
- Hebrew calendar: 4642–4643
- Hindu calendars
- Vikram Samvat: 938–939
- Shaka Samvat: 803–804
- Kali Yuga: 3982–3983
- Holocene calendar: 10882
- Iranian calendar: 260–261
- Islamic calendar: 268–269
- Japanese calendar: Gangyō 6 (元慶６年)
- Javanese calendar: 780–781
- Julian calendar: 882; DCCCLXXXII
- Korean calendar: 3215
- Minguo calendar: 1030 before ROC 民前1030年
- Nanakshahi calendar: −586
- Seleucid era: 1193/1194 AG
- Thai solar calendar: 1424–1425
- Tibetan calendar: ལྕགས་མོ་གླང་ལོ་ (female Iron-Ox); 1008 or 627 or −145 — to — ཆུ་ཕོ་སྟག་ལོ་ (male Water-Tiger); 1009 or 628 or −144

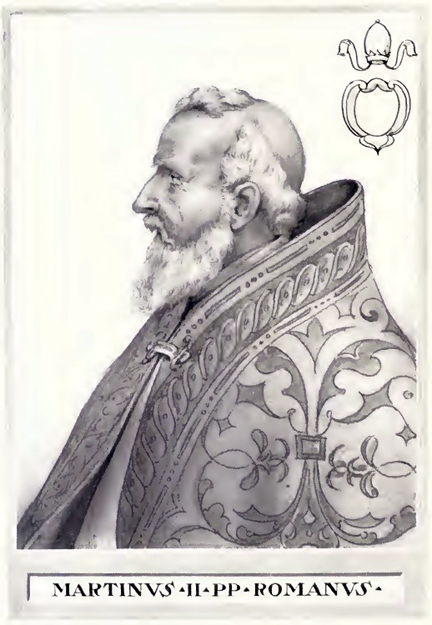
Pope Marinus I (882–884)

Year 882 (DCCCLXXXII) was a common year starting on Monday of the Julian calendar.

== Events ==
=== By place ===
==== Europe ====
- January 20 – King Louis the Younger dies in Frankfurt. He leaves his territory to his younger brother, Emperor Charles the Fat, who becomes sole ruler of the East Frankish Kingdom.
- April 11 – Battle of Remich: A Frankish army under Bishop Wala of Metz is defeated by Vikings, who are on a raid, near Remich (modern Luxembourg). During the fighting Wala is killed.
- Siege of Asselt: Charles the Fat besieges a Viking camp, who have plundered along the Meuse, the Rhine and the Moselle. He defeats their leader Godfrid, and grants him West Frisia.
- August 5 – King Carloman II becomes sole ruler of the West Frankish Kingdom, after the accidental death of his brother, Louis III. His power is limited by rebellious nobles in Burgundy.
- Oleg of Novgorod takes Kiev, and makes it his capital, forming the Kievan Rus'.

==== Britain ====
- King Alfred the Great increases the size of his new navy, and sails out to attack four Viking ships. Two of the ships are captured (before they surrender), and the other crews are killed.

==== Arabian Empire ====
- December – Ishaq ibn Kundaj, a Turkic military leader, arrests the Abbasid caliph Al-Mu'tamid, when the latter (and his followers) try to flee into Tulunid territory.

=== By topic ===
==== Religion ====
- December 16 – Pope John VIII is assassinated at Rome after a 10-year reign, probably the victim of a political conspiracy. He is succeeded by Marinus I, as the 108th pope of the Catholic Church.

== Births ==
- February 8 – Muhammad ibn Tughj al-Ikhshid, founder of the Ikhshidid Dynasty (d. 946)
- Abu 'l-Asakir Jaysh ibn Khumarawayh, Muslim emir (approximate date)
- Cao Zhongda, official and chancellor of Wuyue (d. 943)
- Feng Dao, Chinese prince and chancellor (d. 954)
- Han Yanhui, Chinese Khitan chancellor (d. 959)
- Saadia Gaon, Jewish philosopher and exegete (or 892)
- Xia Luqi, general of the Later Tang Dynasty (d. 930)

== Deaths ==
- January 20 – Louis the Younger, king of the East Frankish Kingdom
- August 5 – Louis III, king of the West Frankish Kingdom
- December 16 – John VIII, pope of the Catholic Church
- December 21 – Hincmar, archbishop of Reims (b. 806)
- Ainbíth mac Áedo, Dál Fiatach king of Ulaid (Ireland)
- Al-Hasan ibn Makhlad al-Jarrah, Muslim vizier
- Ansgarde of Burgundy, Frankish queen (or 880)
- Chen Tao, Chinese poet (b. 824)
- Eric Anundsson, Swedish king (approximate date)
- Eudokia Ingerina, Byzantine empress (approximate date)
- Duan Yanmo, Chinese warlord (approximate date)
- García Íñiguez I, king of Pamplona (approximate date)
- Guaram Mampali, Georgian Bagratid prince
- Lambert III, Frankish nobleman (b. 830)
