= Xia Luqi =

Xia Luqi (Chinese: 夏鲁奇; 883–931) was a general of the Later Tang dynasty of the Five Dynasties and Ten Kingdoms period.

== Early life ==
He was born in Qingzhou (modern day Qingzhou, Shandong Province) during the late Tang dynasty.

== Military career ==
Originally an officer under the Later Liang, he defected to Later Tang and served under Li Cunxu (Emperor Zhuangzong of Tang). He helped Zhuangzong's generals Zhou Dewei and Yuan Xingqin in an attack on Youzhou, against the Later Liang general Liu Xun in modern Wei County, Handan. While waiting for assistance from later Tang general Li Cunshen, Xia and Zhuangzong were caught in ambush set up by Liu Xun and fought their way out, killing hundreds. Zhuangzong rewarded Xia with the privilege of using the imperial surname of Li. In another battle, Xia recognized Later Liang general Wang Yanzhang and rode out by himself and pointed his lance at Wang's neck. After the conquest of Later Liang, Zhuangzong sent Xia to Zhengzhou with the title of Jiedushi of Heyang.

In March 926, Zhuangzong sent Xia to execute the family of Jiedushi of Hezhong Li Jilin (birth name Zhu Youqian), including Li Jilin's illiterate wife Lady Zhang. In May 926, Zhuangzong was killed in a mutiny, and Li Siyuan ascended the throne as Mingzong. Xia reverted to using only his original surname. In 930, as Mingzong prepared a Later Tang attack on the state of Jingnan (also called Nanping), there was a rebellion by Meng Zhixiang, Jiedushi of Xichuan and Dong Zhang, jiedushi of Dongchuan. Also involved in the rebellion were general Li Renhan, Zhao Tingyin at Hanzhou and Zhang Ye (later named Zhang Ye). The rebels attack Xia's Suizhou garrison with an army of 30,000 in October 930. Xia asked the Later Tang imperial court for assistance, and they sent Shi Jingtang (who later overthrew Later Tang and became founding emperor of Later Jin). The rebel army sent officers Kang Wentong and Gao Jingrou from Zizhou with 20,000 peasant militia to block Shi's army from reaching Suizhou.

== Death ==
Shortly before the Chinese lunar new year of 931, Xia committed suicide by slitting his throat. He was posthumously made Duke of Qi (Chinese: 齊國公).
