= Wang Chuhui =

Wang Chuhui (王處回) (died 951), courtesy name Yaxian (亞賢), was an official of the Chinese Five Dynasties and Ten Kingdoms Period Later Tang and Later Shu states, serving as the chief of staff (Shumishi) for both emperors of Later Shu, Meng Zhixiang and Meng Chang.

== Background ==
Little is recorded in traditional histories about Wang Chuhui's background, including when he was born. It is known that he was from Pengcheng (彭城, in modern Xuzhou, Jiangsu). He was described to have a lenient, caring, and alert personality.

== During Later Tang ==
As of 929, Wang Chuhui was serving as the deputy chief of staff (中門副使, Zhongmen Fushi) under Meng Zhixiang the Later Tang-commissioned military governor (Jiedushi) of Xichuan Circuit (西川, headquartered in modern Chengdu, Sichuan). That year, there was an occasion when a younger brother of the officer Meng Rong (孟容), who was serving as a tax collector, had embezzled from the tax funds and was sentenced to death. On account of Meng Rong, Wang and Meng Zhixiang's secretary Feng Qu (馮璩) sought lenity for Meng Rong's brother. Meng Zhixiang refused, stating that even if the guilty were his own brother, he would not have shown lenity.

In 932, Meng's general Zhao Tingyin had just defeated Dong Zhang the military governor of neighboring Dongchuan Circuit (東川, headquartered in modern Mianyang, Sichuan), causing Dong's officers into killing him and surrendering the circuit to Meng Zhixiang. Meng was heading to Dongchuan's capital Zi Prefecture (梓州) to accept the surrender, when he fell seriously ill on the way. Wang attended to him, and made sure that whenever meals were served to Meng, that they were completely eaten (presumably, Wang himself ate the remainder), to create the impression that Meng's illness was not as serious as it actually was, to make sure that the soldiers would not panic. (Meng soon recovered thereafter.) Wang thereafter was made chief of staff.

== During Later Shu ==
In 934, Meng Zhixiang declared himself the emperor of a new state of Later Shu. Wang Chuhui was made his chief of staff — and as Meng was now emperor, Wang's title became the greater title of Shumishi.

Later in the year, Meng became seriously ill. He left a will entrusting his son and crown prince Meng Renzan (whose name was later changed to Meng Chang) to the chancellor Zhao Jiliang, the senior generals Li Renhan and Zhao Tingyin, Wang, and the imperial guard generals Zhang Gongduo and Hou Hongshi (侯弘實), and then died. The news of his death was not immediately announced, and Wang informed Zhao Jiliang first. As he did, he was weeping, and Zhao Jiliang pointed out that the state was not yet on firm grounds, and that the appropriate thing to do is to quickly support Meng Chang to take the throne. Wang apologized and agreed. Zhao then instructed him to inform Li and to observe Li's attitude (as both of them had suspicions that Li might be unwilling to serve a young emperor). When Wang reached Li's mansion, however, Li only met him after surrounding himself with armed guards. Wang therefore decided not to inform him of Meng Zhixiang's death, until after Meng Chang took the throne shortly after. (With Zhang and Meng Chang's close associates Han Jixun (韓繼勳), Han Baozhen (韓保貞), and An Siqian (安思謙) all suspecting Li as well, Meng Chang shortly after had Li arrested and put to death after consulting with Zhao Jiliang and Zhao Tingyin; Wang's involvement in the matter, if any, was not stated in history.) Meng bestowed on Wang the honorary chancellor title of Shizhong (侍中) and also gave him the title of military governor of Wutai Circuit (武泰, headquartered in modern Chongqing). (As with the case with other high-level Later Shu officials/generals at the time, Wang did not actually report to Wutai, but governed the circuit remotely through staff members.)

In 938, Wang, who was still serving as chief of staff and continued to do so, was made the military governor of Wuxin Circuit (武信, headquartered in modern Suining, Sichuan), and given the honorary chancellor title of Tong Zhongshu Menxia Pingzhangshi (同中書門下平章事).

In 941, Meng Chang, believing that the circuits were being misgoverned in the absence of the high level officials who were also serving as their military governors, bestowed additional honorific titles on Zhao Tingyin, Wang, and Zhang, but stripped them of their military governor titles and put those circuits under civilian officials. However, in 944, for reasons unclear, Meng reversed his reforms on this issue, and Wang was given the military governorship of Baoning Circuit (保寧, headquartered in modern Nanchong, Sichuan).

It was said that because of his accomplishments and seniority, Wang became very autocratic and corrupt, widely selling offices for bribes. His son Wang Dejun (王德筠) was similarly corrupt. In 948, after senior chancellor Zhang Ye was put to death on account of his corruption, there was some belief that Wang might be killed as well. Meng, however, did not have the heart to act against Wang, but instead suggested that he should retire. Wang, in fear, offered to retire, and was made the military governor of Wude Circuit (武德, i.e., Dongchuan) and given the honorary chancellor title of Zhongshu Ling (中書令). Shortly after, he was allowed to retire entirely, with the honorary title of Taizi Taifu (太子太傅). He died in summer 951.

== Notes and references ==
- Spring and Autumn Annals of the Ten Kingdoms, vol. 52.
- Zizhi Tongjian, vols. 276, 277, 279, 281, 282, 286, 287, 288.
