= Zhang Gongduo =

Zhang Gongduo (Chinese: 張公鐸; died 945) was a general and official of the Chinese Five Dynasties and Ten Kingdoms Period Later Shu state.

== Service under Meng Zhixiang ==
It is not known when Zhang Gongduo was born, but it is known that he was from Taiyuan. He was said to have studied literature and history in his youth. At some point, he became a follower of the Later Tang general Meng Zhixiang, then the military governor (Jiedushi) of Xichuan Circuit (西川, headquartered in modern Chengdu, Sichuan), and when Meng built up his military strength (in anticipation of a potential confrontation with the Later Tang imperial government) by recruiting and establishing a number of army corps, Zhang was put in command of the Yisheng (義勝) and the Dingyuan (定遠) corps.

As of 932, Meng was in conflict with his erstwhile ally Dong Zhang the military governor of neighboring Dongchuan Circuit (東川, headquartered in modern Mianyang, Sichuan), after the two, who had jointly rebelled against the imperial government earlier, should enter into some rapprochement with the imperial government — given that An Chonghui, the powerful chief of staff (Shumishi) to then-reigning emperor Li Siyuan, who had previously been advocates of the imperial campaign against the two of them, had been executed by Li. Meng wanted to at least formally resubmit to the imperial government, but Dong refused, as his son Dong Guangye (董光業) and Dong Guangye's family, had been executed by the imperial government. Dong, indeed, decided to launch a campaign against Xichuan to conquer it. The two armies, commanded by their respective military governors, encountered each other at Han Prefecture (漢州, in modern Deyang, Sichuan). Zhang's Yisheng and Dingyuan corps were stationed as rearguards in the Xichuan formation. Dong, who was a fierce warrior, was initially winning the battle, killing Meng's subordinates Mao Chongwei (毛重威) and Li Tang (李瑭). Meng, in fear, pointed at the rearguards — apparently intending to signal retreat. Believing that he was ordered to engage, Zhang led the Yisheng and the Dingyuan corps into battle with a loud shout, crushing the Dongchuan troops, killing several thousands, and capturing Dong's officers Yuan Gui (元瓌) and Dong Guangyan (董光演, apparently also a son of Dong Zhang's). The Dongchuan troops collapsed, causing Dong to panic and flee back to Dongchuan's capital Zi Prefecture (梓州), where he was subsequently killed in a mutiny, with the mutineers then surrendering to Meng. For Zhang's accomplishments, he was given the command of the more prestigious Pengsheng (捧聖) and Konghe (控鶴) corps.

== Service under Meng Chang ==
In 934 (by which time Li Siyuan's son Li Conghou was Later Tang's emperor), Meng Zhixiang declared himself the emperor of a new state of Later Shu. He became deathly ill not soon after, however, and he, after entrusting his young son Meng Renzan (soon renamed Meng Chang) to Zhang Gongduo and a few other high-level officials and generals — the chancellor Zhao Jiliang and the generals Li Renhan, Zhao Tingyin, Wang Chuhui, and Hou Hongshi (侯弘實) — died. Meng Chang succeeded him as emperor. Meng Chang conferred on Zhang the honorary title of acting Taiwei (太尉).

In the aftermaths of Meng Chang's succession, Li Renhan became very arrogant and insisted on being put in command of the imperial guards. Meng Chang initially agreed. However, Zhang, as well as Meng Chang's close associates Han Jixun (韓繼勳), Han Baozhen (韓保貞), and An Siqian (安思遷), all secretly accused Li of plotting treason. Meng Chang thereafter had Han Jixun consult Zhao Jiliang and Zhao Tingyin and, apparently after receiving their blessing, arrested and killed Li. Not long after, he received the title of military governor of Baoning Circuit (保寧, headquartered in modern Nanchong, Sichuan), as well the chancellor designation Tong Zhongshu Menxia Pingzhangshi (同中書門下平章事). (Whether his chancellor designation was fully functional or honorary at this point is unclear, as Tang had a tradition of bestowing chancellor designations on military governors as honorary titles, although it must have subsequently become functional, even if not at this point, based on subsequent events.) It was said that he governed with integrity and sternness, and the people benefitted from his governance.

In 941, as part of Meng Chang's reforms to end the practice of having high-level officials and generals hold office at the imperial government at the capital Chengdu but continuing to serve also as military governors – as the result was that they were not attentive to their circuits, and their staff members would effectively rule the circuit and mismanage them – several high-level officials/generals who were doing so, including Zhang, were given some additional honors but stripped of their military governorships. (For reasons unclear, in 944, Meng reversed his reform and again had high-level officials/generals assume military governorships, although it was not stated whether Zhang received the military governorship of Baoning, or any other circuit, at that time.)

Zhang died in 945. When Meng mourned him, Meng commented, "Only Lord Zhang was capable of being stern but not cruel, and being honest but not restrictive."

== Notes and references ==
- Spring and Autumn Annals of the Ten Kingdoms, vol. 51.
- Zizhi Tongjian, vols. 277, 279, 282.
