= Battle of Remich =

882 battle

- Part of the Viking raids in the Rhineland
Date	April 11, 882
Location	Remich, Luxembourg
Result	Viking victory

Belligerents
Carolingian Empire	Kingdom of Denmark

Commanders and leaders
Wala of Metz †; Bertulf; Adalhard of Metz	Godfrid; Sigfrid

Strength
Unknown	Unknown

Casualties and losses
Unknown	Unknown

The Battle of Remich was fought between Vikings and Frankish officials at Remich, Luxembourg, on April 11, 882. The Vikings were led by Godfrid and Sigfrid, while the Franks were led by Wala, the archbishop of Metz, Bertulf, the archbishop of Trier, and Adalhard, the Count of Metz. The battle was a victory for the Vikings, although they retreated after the battle. It marks the southernmost advance of the Vikings into the Rhineland.

== Sources ==
- Walther Vogel: Die Normannen und das Fränkische Reich bis zur Gründung der Normandie (= Heidelberger Abhandlungen zur mittleren und neueren Geschichte. Band 14). Winter, Heidelberg 1906, S. 282–294.
- Eugen Ewig: Das Trierer Land im Merowinger- und Karolingerreich. In: Geschichte des Trierer Landes (= Schriftenreihe zur trierischen Landesgeschichte und Volkskunde. Band 10). Arbeitsgemeinschaft für Landesgeschichte und Volkskunde des Trierer Raumes, Trier 1964, S. 222–302, hier S. 284–286.
- Burkhard Apsner: Die hoch- und spätkarolingische Zeit (9. und frühes 10. Jahrhundert). In: Heinz Heinen, Hans Hubert Anton, Winfried Weber (Editor): Geschichte des Bistums Trier. Band 1. Im Umbruch der Kulturen. Spätantike und Mittelalter (= Veröffentlichungen des Bistumsarchivs Trier. Band 38). Paulinus, Trier 2003, p. 255–284; 273–274.
