= Viking raids in the Rhineland =

Series of medieval raids

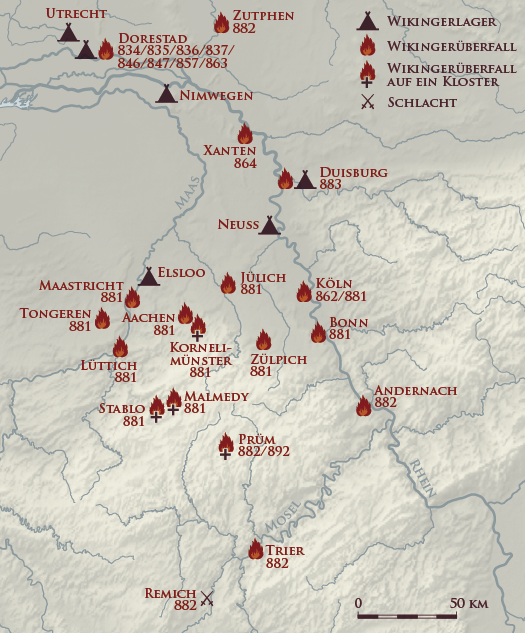
Overview map of the Viking raids in the Rhineland. Key: Wikingerlager = "Viking camp", Wikingerüberfall = "Viking raid", Wikingerüberfall auf ein Kloster = "Viking raid on a monastery", Schlacht = "battle"

The Viking raids in the Rhineland were part of a series of invasions of Francia by the Vikings that took place during the final decades of the 9th century. From the Rhineland, which can be regarded as the nucleus of Frankish culture, the Franks had previously conquered almost the whole of Central Europe and established a great empire.

During these raids, the Vikings plundered the ancient Roman cities of Cologne, Bonn, Xanten, Trier and also the imperial city of Aachen, in which Charlemagne was buried and on whose throne the Frankish kings were crowned in Aachen Cathedral. In addition to these cities, numerous monasteries were also destroyed, together with entire libraries in which collections of writings from several centuries had been preserved. This shook the essence of Frankish culture.

Similar raids affected the regions where the Vikings had originally settled: the British Isles, the Baltic Sea region, Russia and the Mediterranean region. Many inhabitants of the affected regions were carted off as slaves, the Bukhara slave trade along the Volga trade route being a major trade of the vikings.

== The Rhineland ==
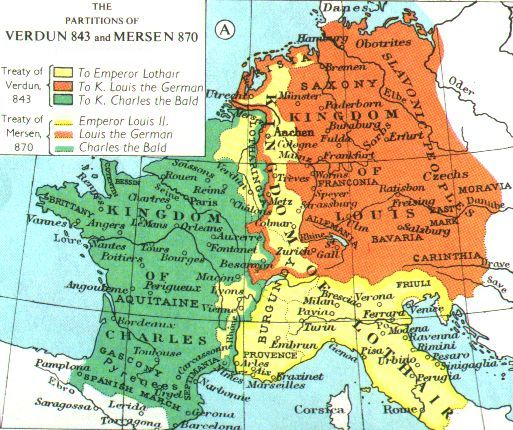
The Frankish realms after the Treaty of Meersen in 870 – the Rhineland was located in Lorraine (yellow)

The term Rhineland is used to describe areas on the Middle and Lower Rhine that are not defined in more detail. It was not designated as such until 1798, when French Revolutionary troops occupied this territory. Previously, this region was mostly named after towns or counties, for example, the Gelderland, or Land of Cleves (Klever Land).

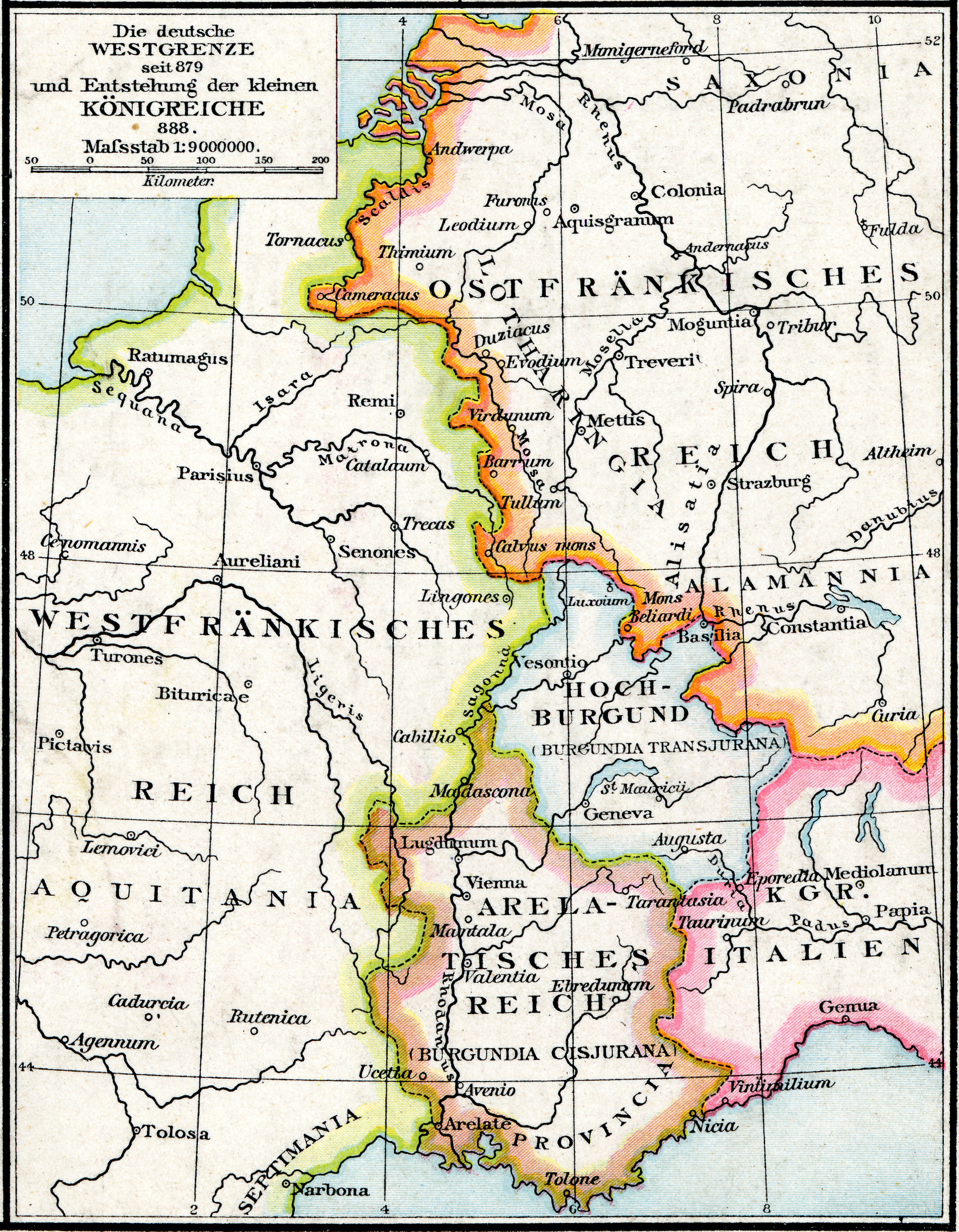
The Franconian Frankish kingdoms c. 880; the Rhineland lies in the western part of East Francia

The area known today as the Rhineland begins at the confluence of the Moselle and the Rhine and ends at Emmerich, where the Rhine divides into the Lek and the Waal to form a delta. In the east, the Rhineland ends close to the Rhine itself, being bounded by low mountain ranges such as the Siebengebirge or Bergisches Land. To the west its boundary is less well defined, but in general parlance it runs beyond the present state border with the Netherlands, i.e. east of the Meuse. Because the modern state of Rhineland-Palatinate lies south of the Moselle, the low mountain range of the Eifel north of the river is usually seen as belonging to the Rhineland. Areas south of the Moselle, such as the Hunsrück, are also considered to be part of the Rhineland.

== The Rhineland in the Carolingian period ==
The heartland of the Carolingians lay, for the most part, in territories that were part of the Rhineland. As a result, important sites of Carolingian culture are located here. Of particular note are the city of Aachen, where Charlemagne had his imperial palace built, and also the Benedictine abbey (Prüm Abbey) in Prüm in 882 and in 892 – the latter mainly because of its scriptorium and associated library. The old Roman cities of Trier, Cologne, Xanten and Bonn were also located in the Rhineland and were used by the Franks as centres of trading and episcopal seats. In 843 AD, the Frankish Empire was divided into three kingdoms. Most areas of the Rhineland fell into the dominion of Lothair I and were named Lothringen. This was the middle kingdom that ran from the North Sea to the Mediterranean Sea with no border crossings between East and West Francia. After this division of the empire, almost all areas of the former great empire experienced conflicts over power of a civil warlike nature. The Rhineland was also affected by this. When Lothair I died in 855 without an heir to his throne, the power struggles intensified. In 870, following the Treaty of Meersen, the Rhineland was assigned to East Francia. Ten years later, the Treaty of Ribemont specified the boundaries more precisely. The map opposite shows the result.

== Vikings and Franks ==
After the defeat of Saxony (772–804) the empire of Charlemagne extended to the mouth of the Elbe and beyond. By this time at the latest, the first contacts with the Vikings who, like the Saxons, worshipped pagan gods, took place.

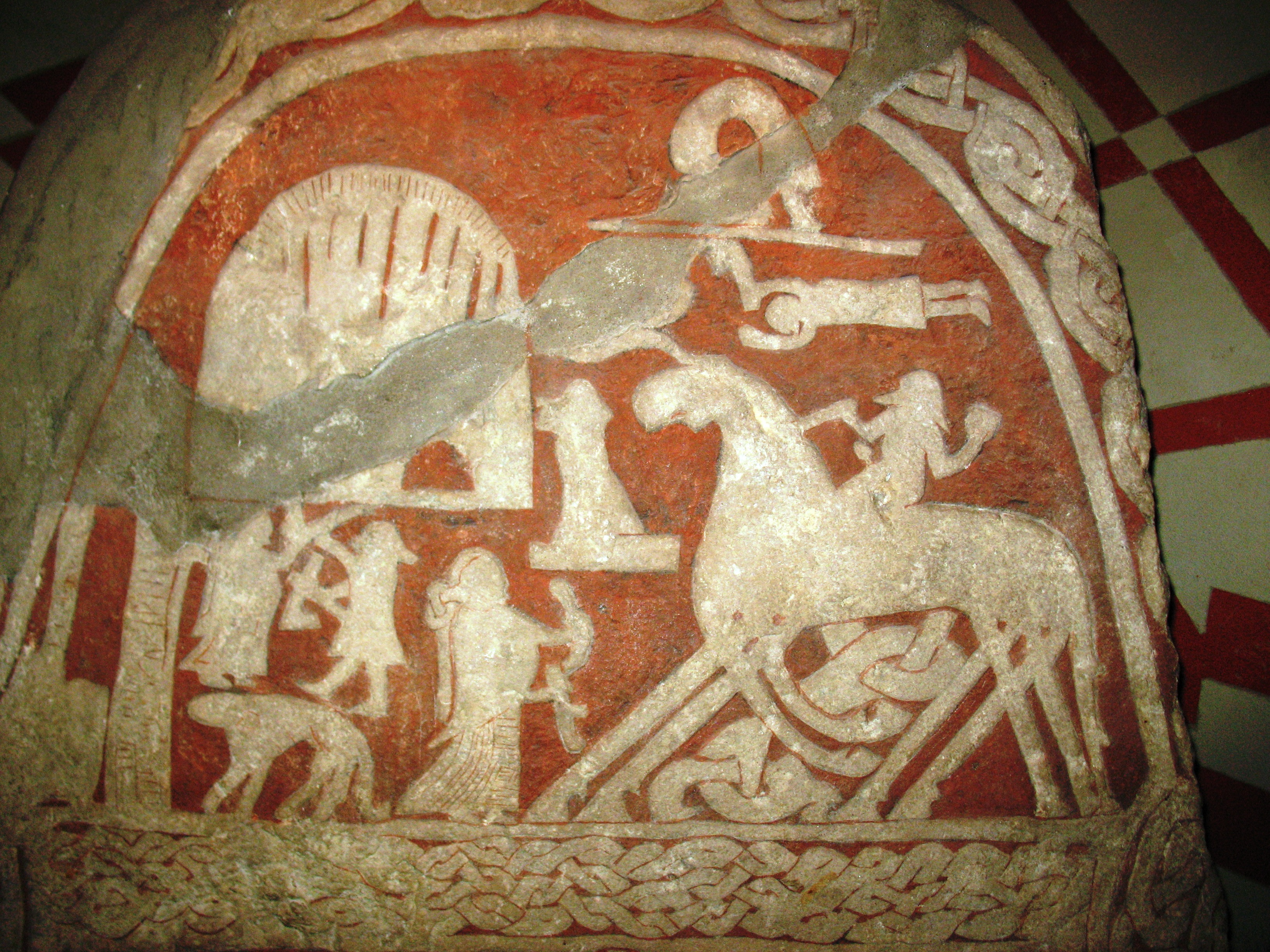
Entry into Valhalla (relief from Gotland)

These contacts were often warlike in nature. The Frisian islands were affected as well as the Frisian mainland. To ward off the attacks, Charlemagne set up a march on the northern border of his empire, the name of today's state of Denmark being derived from it. Despite the warlike situation on the northern border, many Vikings were used as mercenaries in Frankish campaigns.

The Vikings were bold raiders, perhaps because of the code of honour they are purported to have had, According to legend, the god of war, Odin, from the Asa line of gods, prepared to fight for the world and its survival. He sent his messengers, the valkyries, to escort the bravest warriors killed in a battle to Valhalla. The warriors who gathered there, called Einherjar, practised the art of warfare during the daytime. In the evening, after their wounds had healed, the army of the dead moved into Odin's hall together, where there was always a filled drinking horn and a good meal. Whether this code of honour existed or not, much of their fighting was, in any case, against civilian populations and weakly defended towns and monasteries.

One of the first Viking kings to be baptized was Harald Klak who, in 826, became a vassal of King Louis the German at Ingelheim am Rhein and was baptized in Mainz with his wife and son.

During this time, the Vikings attacked the Frankish Empire sailing their ships up the big rivers from the North Sea and Atlantic Ocean. Such raids mainly affected areas on the Seine and in modern-day Netherlands and Belgium. Previously, the Vikings had raided England (Lindisfarne, 793) and Ireland (Dublin, 795). In 820, the first major attack by Vikings on the Frankish Empire was recorded, taking place around the mouth of the river Seine, and at the same time other Vikings probably invaded Flanders. In 845, Paris was attacked for the first time with about 700 longships up the Seine. The Parisians bought the raiders off with 7,000 pounds of silver. By 926, thirteen of these payments have been documented in the Frankish Empire. The Elbe estuary and the already fortified city of Hamburg were attacked by Danish warriors in 845.

Initially, the attacks took the form of raids and the Vikings withdrew to their homeland afterwards. In the 860s, they changed tactics and established permanent bases in Francia, from where they coordinated their raids, and sometimes overwintered in their fortified army camps. The Rhineland, the heartland of the Frankish Empire, was little affected by the Vikings at that time.

The Vikings were not a united people, but a collection of warring tribes; small wars between Viking tribes were frequent, united large-scale attacks were preceded in principle by purposeful diplomatic negotiations. Since the Vikings could only be driven out of the occupied territories at great cost, attempts were occasionally made to involve their leaders in the Empire by means of rich gifts and the granting of fiefdoms. As a rule, these Viking leaders were expected to be baptized beforehand, since the Frankish empire was considered by the Frankish nobility to be a gift from God and so there were no thrones for higher nobles who were unbelievers.

== Raids of 862 and 864 ==
Between 834 and 863 the Vikings laid waste eight times to the trading post of Dorestad on the Lek river, a town that competed with the Danish town of Haithabu. In 862, Vikings attacked up the Rhine for the first time and plundered Cologne. In 863, the Normans conquered Utrecht and Nijmegen and established permanent winter camps in both towns; Dorestad was razed during the campaign. In 864, they left there on a second campaign into the Lower Rhine territories and ambushed and plundered the city of Xanten which had been founded by the Romans.

== Trade and navigation on the Rhine between 864 and 881 ==
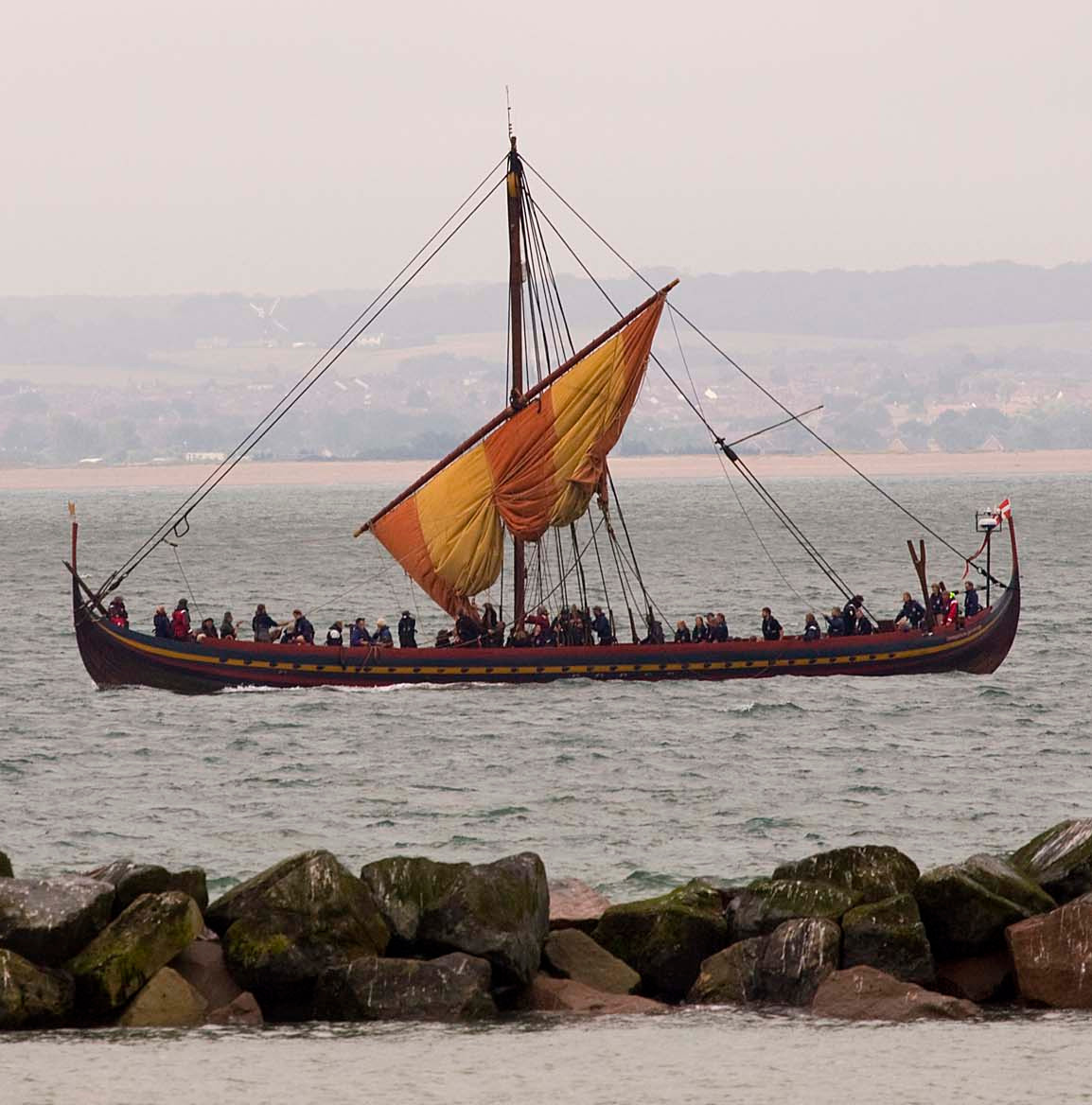
Reconstructed Viking ship, Havhingsten fra Glendalough, mid-11th century

The Franks were not real seafarers – although there were types of ship (e.g. the Utrecht ship) which, in good weather, were suitable for coastal navigation. However, since no wrecks of such boats have been found in the North Sea to date, their use for coastal navigation must be assumed to be rare. There were different construction methods for boats. Some were made of large, hollowed out, tree-trunks; others were more like rafts. Both types were difficult to manoeuvre and were used for transporting heavy goods such as rocks. The quarries were often ruined Roman buildings near the Rhine, but there were also quarries in the neighbouring mountain ranges. These boats floated down the river with the current or were hauled upriver as barges pulled by horses or oxen, a technique known as treideln.

The main building material in the Frankish Empire was wood. Logs were tied together and rafted downriver to the markets, and other commodities and travellers were transported on rafts which, in some cases, were very long and wide.

When the Vikings settled on the banks of the Rhine delta, they had a competitive advantage as traders, because their outstanding shipbuilding technology enabled them to overcome strongcurrents like those of the Rhine, so they were able to ship goods quickly. As a result, trade in the Rhineland flourished. Since Vikings had also settled in Ireland, England and Russia at the same time, trade goods expanded to include products from and beyond the more distant regions.

== Winter raids of 881/882 ==
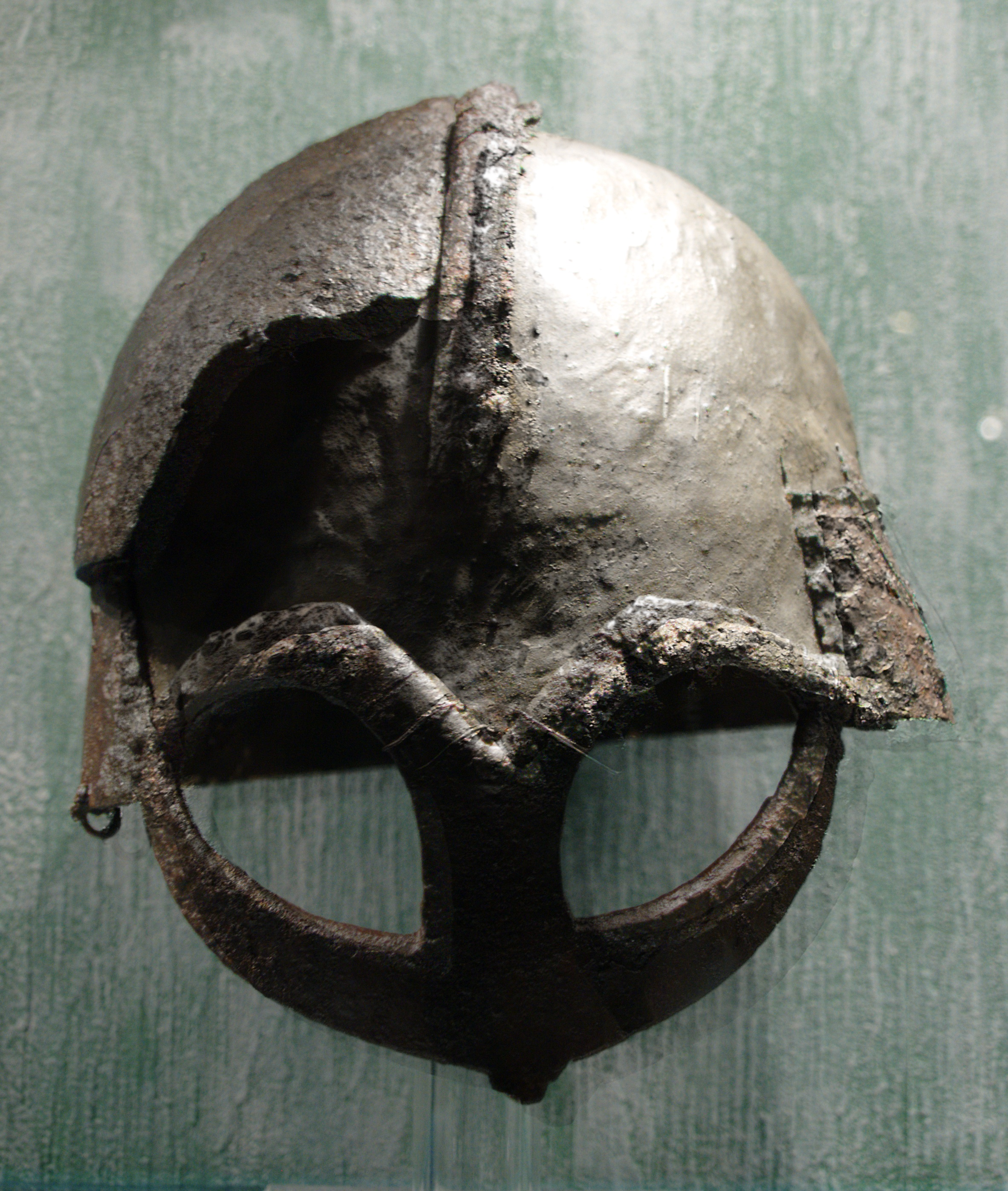
Viking helmet, probably damaged by a cutting weapon

The situation changed when the so-called Great Heathen Army suffered a severe defeat in 878 at Edington in southwest England at the hands of King Alfred the Great (reigned 871–899). The defeated Vikings then set off for continental Europe and transferred their theatre of war to the coastal region of the English Channel, Northern France and Flanders. On 3 August 881, the West Francian king Louis III with his army also won victory over the Normans at Saucourt-en-Vimeu in central France.

The Vikings then turned their aggression eastwards towards the Rhineland. Charles III was residing in Italy at this time, his imperial coronation having taken place on 12 February 881 in Rome. For the celebrations he was accompanied by numerous armoured knights; thus many of his best armed warriors were not available to defend their homeland in the winter of 881.

Despite the invasion of West Francia by the Great Army in 878, no defensive measures had apparently been taken in East Francian Rhineland, since the city walls of individual cities were only reinforced when the Vikings were almost at the city gates. Thus, in the absence of Charles III, the population of the Rhine was almost defenceless and at the mercy of the Vikings' attack, and fleeing was the best course of action to save lives and goods. As a result, the Vikings often captured entire towns, villages and monasteries without fighting.

=== Raids in the Rhine-Meuse area ===
In late 881, Vikings, who had overwintered in Flanders, set off on a military expedition to neighbouring lands. They raided numerous villages in the area of the Meuse and razed the towns of Liège, Maastricht and Tongeren to the ground.

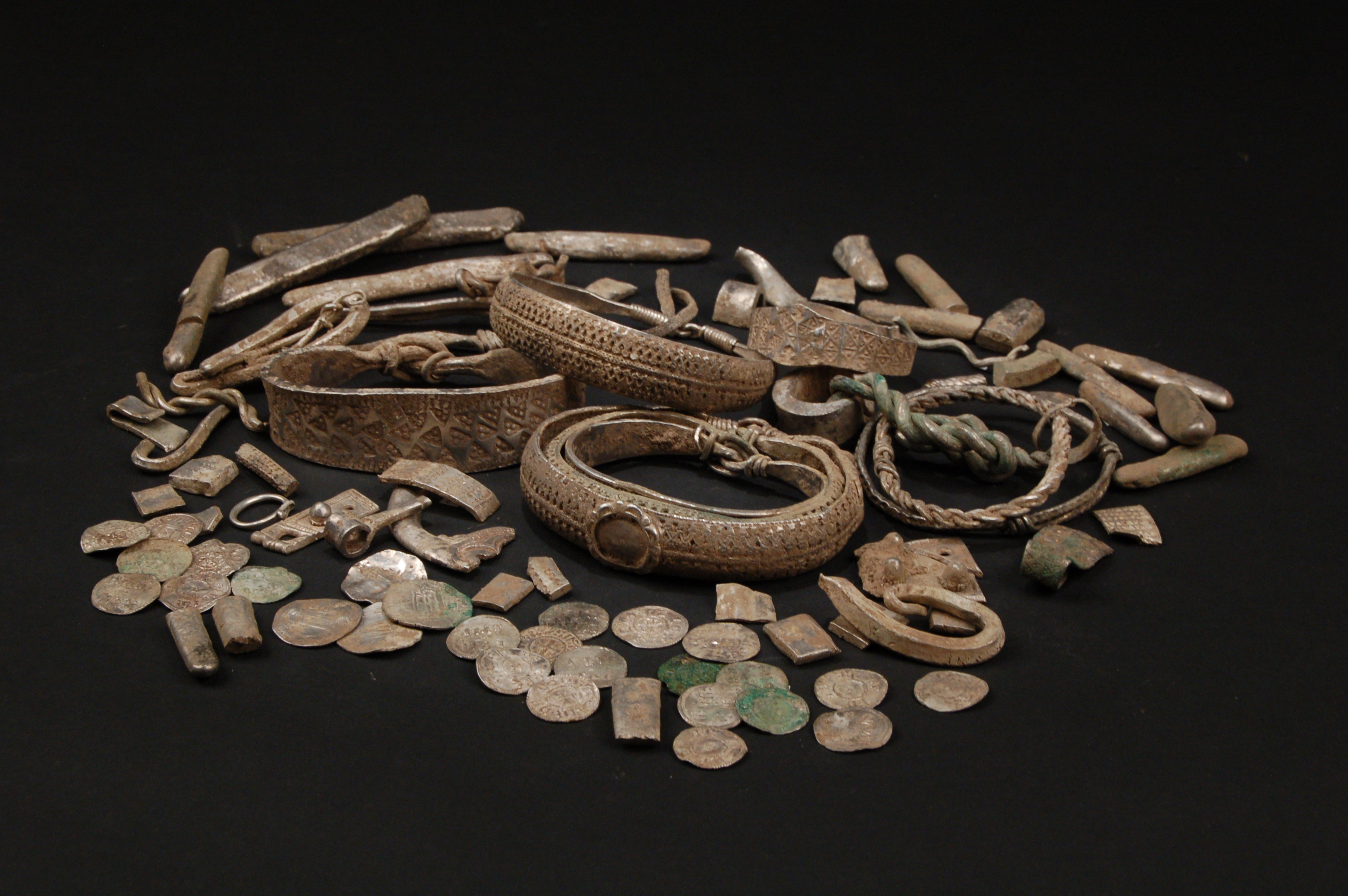
Hoard from the Viking period

In December 881, Vikings of this group sailed on at least three ships under their leader, Godfrid, up the Rhine. As they went, they plundered villages and towns or extorted money from their inhabitants (Brandschatzung).

Particularly affected were the cities of Cologne, Bonn, Neuss, Jülich and Andernach. On their first visit to Cologne in January 882, after tough negotiations, Cologne paid a fortune in silver for their withdrawal (see also Danegeld). On their return journey, the same group again demanded payment of a sum of money, which the destitute citizens of Cologne could not afford, whereupon the city was burned to the ground.

The Normans, presumably from Denmark, probably also carried horses on their Viking ships. In any case, they were very mobile, something that was aided by being able to utilise the old Roman roads of the Rhineland on the left bank of the Rhine. The Vikings turned westwards following this road system and plundered towns from Zülpich to Aachen.

=== Raids on cultural centres in the Aachen area ===
Artist's impression of the Palace of Aachen (c. 800) with the octagon of the cathedral (top left), the thermal spa (bottom left) and the palace (bottom right)

When they had stormed the imperial city, the conquerors, presumably with calculated, strategic intent, desecrated St. Mary's Church (now the cathedral), the tomb of Charlemagne and the royal stables. After committing these acts, they set the palace and the imperial baths on fire. In late December 881, they plundered the imperial abbey of Kornelimünster, not far from Aachen, as well as the monasteries of Stablo and Malmedy in the Ardennes.

=== First attack on Prüm Abbey ===
On 6 January 882, Three Kings' Day, a detachment of Vikings which, according to historical reports, was about 300 strong, attacked the largest Frankish abbey, Prüm in the Eifel mountains. In the abbey church was the grave of Emperor Lothair I who died there in 855 after concluding the Treaty of Prüm. Attached to the monastery was a hospital and an important monastic school in which the offspring of the Frankish nobility were educated. The Abbey also housed one of the most extensive libraries in the Empire with its scriptorium. Apart from Aachen, Prüm was the cultural centre of the Frankish Empire. The abbey had extensive estates; more than a hundred churches were under its administration; its lands extended far into the present-day Netherlands, and the forests along the Moselle also belonged to the monastery.

A band of peasants from the area resisted the attackers, but were massacred. As a result, the Vikings set all the buildings of the monastery on fire. The abbey burned down to the ground, "since there was no one left alive to fight the fire". Among the monastery's greatest treasures was one of the most precious relics of Western Christianity, the Sandals of Christ, which were carried to safety before the Viking onslaught. Of the manuscript collection, however, which was often praised by chroniclers before, only about one tenth of the collection was able to be rescued in front of the marauding Vikings; the rest perished in the flames.

=== 882 Moselle raid ===
The King of East Francia, Louis III raised an army and rushed to help the Rhinelanders. On 20 January, the king died unexpectedly in Frankfurt, whereupon the army he led against the Vikings was disbanded. The Vikings then moved further up the Rhine. In the course of February and March 882 they attacked as far as Koblenz, pillaging and murdering, but the city was able to resist them thanks to strong fortifications dating back to Roman times. However, the lands outside its walls were devastated. At the same time, in Mainz, the dilapidated Roman walls were quickly fortified again and the citizens of Mainz began to dig a ditch around the city. The Vikings, however, did not move from Koblenz to Mainz, but sailed up the Moselle and reached the Trier countryside during Easter week.

The city gate of Porta Nigra in Trier. Despite its Roman fortifications, Trier was conquered twice by the Vikings.

In Easter Week, 882, the Nordic raiders attacked and destroyed the monasteries, churches and farmsteads outside the city walls of Trier. The imperial monastery of St. Maximin and the abbeys of St. Martin and St. Symphorian, north of the ancient city wall, were destroyed; the latter never being rebuilt. The monastery of St. Paulinus was spared.

On Maundy Thursday, 5 April, 882, the Vikings captured the city itself. After a few days of rest, they plundered Trier on Easter Sunday. Among their targets was Trier Cathedral. Regino of Prüm records numerous victims among the population, but Archbishop Bertulf of Trier managed to escape to Metz with a few of his followers. Afterwards, some of the Vikings went down the Moselle with their booty to Koblenz, while the rest marched on Metz.

The Vikings advancing to Metz were met on 11 April 882 by an army led by the Bishop of Metz, Wala, the Archbishop of Trier, Bertulf, and Count Adalhard II of Metz in the Battle of Remich. The battle was won by the invaders and Bishop Wala fell on the battlefield, alongside many armoured knights and peasants. However, their violent resistance and resultant Viking casualties caused the invaders to turn back, and they retreated north through the Eifel towards their army encampment.

== Ceasefire of Ascloha in Spring 882 ==
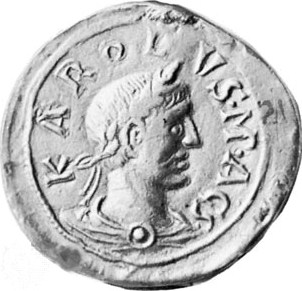
Coin with image of Charles III

After his return from Italy, Emperor Charles III held an Imperial Diet at Worms in May 882, and raised a large army, in which Franks, Bavarians, Swabians, Thuringians, Saxons, Frisians and Lombards participated. The army marched up before the fortified Viking camp named in one source as Ascloha (Asselt in the Annales Fuldenses, 882). Another contemporary source, however, refers to Haslon as the place of negotiation, which is often equated with Elsloo an der Maas (Regino of Prüm, Chronica, 882, specifically mentioned in the entry for the year 881).

Charles III besieged the Normans with his army at a safe distance and, after twelve days, began negotiations with them. The result was a withdrawal of the invaders who were also paid from the church's goods. On the condition that the Viking leader Godfrid was baptised, he was given Frisia as a fief. The peace agreement was additionally sealed by his wedding to a Frankish princess. The princess, Gisla (Gisela) is said to be a daughter of King Lothair II. The Vikings left behind under the leadership of Sigfrid in Ascloha were initially discouraged from further pillaging by payments of money.

== Raid of Summer 882 ==
As early as summer 882, Godfrid returned to the Rhineland with an army reinforced from his homeland for a second raid and devastated Cologne, Bonn and Andernach. Around Andernach, many churches and monasteries were looted and set alight.

Zutphen on the River IJssel and nearby Deventer were also torched during this rampage. Near Mainz, the Vikings were defeated by an army under Count Henry of Babenberg and the Archbishop of Mainz, Liutbert (episcopate 863–889); they probably set fire to Cologne afterwards.

== Raid of Autumn 883 ==
The news of Godfrid's successes in the Rhineland and his acquisition of Frisia attracted other Vikings from Denmark. In autumn 883 they landed in Frisia, rowed up the Rhine with Godfrid's consent and set up camp near Duisburg. Once again, they devastated numerous villages that had just been rebuilt. The people of Cologne had previously strengthened their walls and were spared this time. When the Vikings passed by, Cologne's churches and monasteries were still charred ruins.

That year, the Vikings withdrew from the Middle Rhine and settled permanently on the Lower Rhine. They occupied Xanten and Duisburg and made small raids from there into the surrounding area, especially the region of Xanten and the Ruhrgebiet.

== 884 Frankish campaign against the Vikings ==
In 884, a body of troops led by Henry, Margrave of the Franks of Babenberg succeeded in recapturing Duisburg, and the Vikings withdrew from the rest of the Lower Rhine region in return for more payments. Henry defeated most Vikings in East Francia by 885, but then died in the Viking Siege of Paris (885–886).

== Literature ==
- Peter Fuchs (ed.): Chronik zur Geschichte der Stadt Köln. Vol. 1, Greven Verlag, Cologne, 1990, ISBN 3-7743-0259-6.
- Peter H. Sawyer: Kings and Vikings. Scandinavia and Europe AD 700–1100. Routledge, London/New York, 1983, ISBN 0-415-04590-8.
- Rudolf Simek: Vikings on the Rhine. Recent Research on Early Medieval Relations between the Rhinelands and Scandinavia. (=Studia Medievalia Septentriolia (SMS) 11) Fassbaender, Vienna, 2004, ISBN 978-3-900538-83-5.
- Walther Vogel: Die Normannen und das Fränkische Reich bis zur Gründung der Normandie (= Heidelberger Abhandlungen zur mittleren und neueren Geschichte. Vol. 14). Winter, Heidelberg, 1906.
- Annemarieke Willemsen (ed.): Wikinger am Rhein. 800–1000. Vikingeskibshallen (Roskilde), Rheinisches Landesmuseum Bonn, Centraal Museum (Utrecht), Utrecht, 2004, ISBN 90-5983-009-1.
- Johann Hildebrand Withof, Albrecht Blank (eds.): Die Chronik der Stadt Duisburg. Von den Anfängen bis zum Jahre 1742. Aus den Duisburgern Intelligenz-Zetteln zusammengestellt und mit Anmerkungen versehen. Books on Demand, Norderstedt, 2008, ISBN 978-3-8370-2530-9 online bei Google Books.
- Eugen Ewig: Das Trierer Land im Merowinger- und Karolingerreich. In: Geschichte des Trierer Landes (= Schriftenreihe zur trierischen Landesgeschichte und Volkskunde. Vol. 10). Arbeitsgemeinschaft für Landesgeschichte und Volkskunde des Trierer Raumes, Trier, 1964, pp. 222–302.
- Burkhard Apsner: Die hoch- und spätkarolingische Zeit (9. und frühes 10. Jahrhundert). In: Heinz Heinen, Hans Hubert Anton, Winfried Weber (eds.): Geschichte des Bistums Trier. Band 1. Im Umbruch der Kulturen. Spätantike und Mittelalter (= Veröffentlichungen des Bistumsarchivs Trier. Vol. 38). Paulinus, Trier, 2003, pp. 255–284.
