= Zhao Jiliang =

Zhao Jiliang (Chinese: 趙季良) (883–946), courtesy name Dezhang (德彰), was an official of the Chinese Former Jin, Later Tang, and Later Shu dynasties, serving as a chancellor under the Later Shu.

== During Former Jin ==
Zhao Jiliang was born in 883 and from Jiyin (濟陰, in modern Heze, Shandong). His father Zhao Yin was a magistrate of Gushu County during Tang dynasty. As of 922, he was serving as the records officer at Wei Prefecture (魏州, in modern Handan, Hebei), then an important city in Jin, which then occupied the territory north of the Yellow River, in enmity to Later Liang, which occupied the territory south of the Yellow River. That year, it was said that Li Cunxu the Prince of Jin was rebuking him because many of Wei's residents owed back taxes, which Zhao was responsible for collecting. This led to this dialogue between him and Li:

Zhao Jiliang: "Your Royal Highness, when do you intend to pacify the territory south of the River?"
Li Cunxu (angry): "Your responsibility is collecting taxes. You are not paying attention to your responsibility. How dare you be involved in military matters?"
Zhao Jiliang: "Your Royal Highness is only concerned about conquest and not showing love to the people. If the people's hearts abandon you, you should be afraid that even north of the River will no longer be yours, not to mention the south."

Li saw his point, was pleased, and thanked him for the advice. From that point on, he valued Zhao and had Zhao participate in policy decisions.

== During Later Tang ==
In 923, Li Cunxu declared himself the emperor of a new Later Tang (as its Emperor Zhuangzong), and shortly after conquered Later Liang and took over its territory. Zhao Jiliang served in Emperor Zhuangzong's administration, initially as an assistant to the director of salt and iron monopolies (鹽鐵判官, Yantie Panguan) and the minister of husbandry (太僕卿, Taipu Qing).

In 925, Emperor Zhaungzong sent an army to destroy Later Tang's southwestern neighbor Former Shu. However, he was shortly after killed in a mutiny himself at the capital Luoyang. One of the rebelling generals, Emperor Zhuangzong's adoptive brother Li Siyuan, took the throne (as Emperor Mingzong). Shortly after, Emperor Mingzong's new chancellor, Ren Huan, who was then serving as the director of the three financial agencies (including salt and iron monopolies) had been one of the generals in the Former Shu campaign, felt that the treasury could be replenished from the storage from the former Former Shu lands, as they were rich lands. He thus sent Zhao to the former Former Shu capital Chengdu to requisition the stored wealth, having Zhao commissioned as the director of transport for the Three Chuans (i.e., Former Shu's former territory Xichuan (西川, headquartered at Chengdu), Dongchuan (東川, headquartered in modern Mianyang, Sichuan), and Shannan West (山南西道, headquartered in modern Hanzhong, Shaanxi) Circuits). When Zhao got there, however, Meng Zhixiang the military governor of Xichuan, who controlled the main parts of the former Former Shu territory and who was commissioned by Emperor Zhuangzong (not Emperor Mingzong), only allowed him to ship the wealth previously stored by Former Shu and refused to also surrender tax revenues to him or let him take office as the director of transport for the three circuits. However, as they had previously been friends, Meng requested that he be allowed to keep Zhao as his deputy military governor. The imperial government (reluctantly) agreed.

The relationships between Emperor Mingzong's administration and Meng, as well as with Dong Zhang the military governor of Dongchuan (who, like Meng, was commissioned by Emperor Zhuangzong) later deteriorated to a point where the administration suspected the two military governors of planning rebellion, and the two military governors were intimidated into in fact planning such a rebellion. In spring 930, Meng sent Zhao as an emissary to Dongchuan's capital Zi Prefecture (梓州) to enter into an alliance with Dong against the imperial government. Upon Zhao's return to Chengdu, however, he informed Meng, "Lord Dong is greedy, cruel, and contentious; he is overly ambitious and not sufficiently thoughtful, and he will surely one day create trouble for Xichuan."

In fall 930, upon hearing news from Xichuan's attaché in Luoyang, Su Yuan (蘇愿), that the imperial government was preparing a major operation against Xichuan and Dongchuan, Meng consulted Zhao as to how to respond. Zhao suggested that he request that Dongchuan first capture the imperially-held Sui (遂州, in modern Suining, Sichuan) and Lang (閬州, in modern Langzhong, Sichuan) Prefectures, and then their joint forces could defend Jiange Pass (劍閣關, in modern Guangyuan, Sichuan) to prevent imperial forces from advancing on Xichuan and Dongchuan. Meng agreed, and after Sui and Lang fell to the joint Xichuan and Dongchuan forces, the imperial forces, under command of Emperor Mingzong's son-in-law, Shi Jingtang, abandoned the campaign in spring 931.

Emperor Mingzong subsequently attempted reconciliation with Xichuan and Dongchuan, issuing pardons for Meng and Dong. Meng wanted to accept the peace overture, as Emperor Mingzong had treated his family members remaining in imperial territory well, but Dong, as his son Dong Guangye (董光業) and Dong Guangye's family had already been executed by the imperial government at the start of the campaign, refused. Meng was initially reluctant to abandon the alliance, and continued to try to persuade Dong. As the discussions continued, Zhao suggested sending the general Gao Yanchou (高彥儔) to attack Bi Prefecture (壁州, in modern Bazhong, Sichuan), to cut off the possibility that Shannan West troops might be able to attack through Bi. However, the official Li Hao opposed, pointing out that doing so would cut off any possibility of reconciliation with the imperial government, and Meng agreed. It was said that thereafter, Zhao began to have antipathy toward Li.

Meng's overtures to Dong were unable to persuade Dong, and Dong, indeed, launched an attack on Xichuan in summer 932. Zhao pointed out that while Dong was known to be a ferocious fighter, he lacked the grace to have his soldiers to be truly committed to his cause. Zhao predicted that while Dongchuan forces will be initially successful, as long as Xichuan persevered, the situation would eventually be reversed, and advocated that Meng should prepare for this and encourage his troops by personally appearing to them — an assessment shared by the general Zhao Tingyin. Once Dong launched the attack, he tried to, in addition to issuing a declaration, foster suspicion in Meng's mind against Zhao Jiliang, Zhao Tingyin, and another general, Li Zhao (李肇) by writing letters addressed to the three of them, but Meng disregarded that. He followed Zhao Jiliang's recommendations and went to the front lines himself, leading Zhao Jiliang and Gao Jingrou (高敬柔) in charge of Chengdu. After a few Dongchuan victories that allowed Dong to penetrate all the way to Mimou Base (彌牟, in modern Chengdu), near Chengdu itself. When the Dongchuan forces then engaged the main Xichuan forces under Meng, they were initially successful, but a counterattack by Meng's general Zhang Gongduo crushed Dong's own personal guard corps, causing a general collapse of the Dongchuan troops. Dong fled back to Zi Prefecture, where he was killed by his own subordinates, who surrendered to Meng and allowed Meng to take over Dongchuan. In the aftermaths of the victory over Dongchuan, Zhao Tingyin and Li Renhan both wanted to be the military governor of Dongchuan; under the advice from Li Hao and Zhao Jiliang, Meng decided to assume the military governor of Dongchuan himself (in addition to Xichuan), while giving both Li Renhan and Zhao Tingyin both smaller circuits. Zhao subsequently suggested that Meng assume the title of prince and exercise imperial powers, but Meng refused at that point. In late 932, in a further show of authority over the region, at Li Hao's suggestion, Meng requested commissions for five of his subordinates as full military governors, including commissioning Zhao Jiliang as the military governor of Wutai Circuit (武泰, headquartered in modern Chongqing). In spring 933, without having further received Emperor Mingzong's orders, Meng went ahead and issued the five military governor commissions on edicts written in black (i.e., still issuing edicts under Emperor Mingzong's purported authorities, but without prior imperial authorization). Shortly after, Emperor Mingzong issued an edict creating Meng as the Prince of Shu and confirming the five military governor commissions. (However, given the subsequent events, it was not clear whether Zhao actually reported to Wutai or remained at Chengdu.)

== During Later Shu ==
Emperor Mingzong died in late 933 and was succeeded by his son Emperor Min. In spring 934, Meng Zhixiang declared himself emperor of a new state of Shu (known historically as Later Shu), as its Emperor Gaozu. He commissioned Zhao Jiliang as Sikong (司空, one of the Three Excellencies), Mengxia Shilang (門下侍郎, the deputy head of the examination bureau of government (門下省, Menxia Sheng)), and chancellor, with the designation Tong Zhongshu Menxia Pingzhangshi (同中書門下平章事), while still carrying the title of military governor of Wutai.

By summer 934, Meng was extremely ill. He created his son Meng Renzan crown prince, and shortly after wrote a will in which he trusted Meng Renzan to Zhao, Li Renhan, Zhao Tingyin, the chief of staff Wang Chuhui, and the imperial guard generals Zhang Gongduo and Hou Hongshi (侯弘實). He died that night. Wang decided not to immediately announce the emperor's death, but instead visited Zhao Jiliang to inform him. When he went to Zhao's mansion to inform him, however, he broke down in tears. Zhao pointed out that given that there were many powerful generals with strong armies, the right thing to do was to immediately announce Meng Renzan's succession, not to deeply mourn the emperor. He also instructed Wang to visit Li to see what Li's attitude was. When Wang visited Li, however, Li only saw him while accompanied by heavy guard, causing Wang to hesitate to inform him of Meng Zhixiang's death that night. The next day, Meng Zhixiang's death and his will were announced. Meng Renzan took the throne (and changed his name to Meng Chang). Shortly after, Zhang, as well as Meng Chang's close associates Han Jixun (韓繼勳), Han Baozhen (韓保貞), and An Siqian (安思謙), accused Li of plotting treason. Meng Chang, after consulting Zhao Jiliang and Zhao Tingyin, had Li arrested and put to death.

Thereafter, because of Zhao Jiliang's accomplishments, Meng Chang made him Situ (司徒, also one of the Three Excellencies), and then the even greater honor of Taibao (太保). In 940, he proposed that the responsibilities over the three financial agencies (salt and iron monopoly, taxation, and treasury) be divided between him and two other chancellors, Wu Zhaoyi and Zhang Ye. In response, Meng Chang put him in charge of taxation, while putting Wu in charge of salt and iron monopolies, and Zhang in charge of treasury. He died in fall 946.

== Notes and references ==
- Spring and Autumn Annals of the Ten Kingdoms (十國春秋), vol. 51.
- Zizhi Tongjian, vols. 271, 275, 277, 278, 279, 282.
