= Li Renhan =

Li Renhan (李仁罕) (died 934), courtesy name Demei (德美), was a major general of the Chinese Five Dynasties and Ten Kingdoms Period Later Shu. He contributed greatly to the campaigns that allowed Later Shu's founding emperor Meng Zhixiang to control his realm. However, later in his career, he became arrogant and greedy, such that Meng Zhixiang's son and successor Meng Chang and other high-level officials came to see him as a threat to Meng Chang's governance, so they had him arrested and executed.

== Background ==
It is not known when Li Renhan was born, but it is known that he was from Chenliu (陳留, in modern Kaifeng, Henan). His early career was not well-documented in history, but it is known that he was an officer in Later Tang's army that conquered Former Shu in 925. When, in 926, after the conquest, the Later Tang commander of that invasion army, Li Jiji the Prince of Wei (the son of then-Later Tang emperor Li Cunxu) was prepared to depart Chengdu (the capital of the destroyed Former Shu state) and return to Later Tang's capital Luoyang, he left a detachment, commanded by several officers — Li Renhan, Pan Rensi (潘仁嗣), Zhao Tingyin, Zhang Ye (Li Renhan's nephew), Wu Zhang (武漳), and Li Tinghou (李廷厚) — at Chengdu, to await the arrival of the new Later Tang-commissioned military governor of Xichuan Circuit (西川, headquartered at Chengdu), Meng Zhixiang, to arrive. (Apparently, then, when Meng subsequently arrived to take office, Li and those other officers came under his command.)

== Service under Meng Zhixiang ==
By 930, the relationships that Meng Zhixiang and Dong Zhang the military governor of neighboring Dongchuan Circuit (東川, headquartered in modern Mianyang, Sichuan) with the imperial government, with Li Cunxu's adoptive brother Li Siyuan as emperor (Li Cunxu's having been killed in a mutiny at Luoyang in 926), had become very strained, and it appeared that war between the imperial government and these two circuits would erupt at any time. At that juncture, there was a time when Li Renhan and Zhang Ye invited Meng to a feast. This led to a rumor, which a Buddhist nun informed Meng, that the two of them were intending to assassinate Meng at the feast. Meng investigated, found no proof of the assassination plot, and eventually discovered that the rumors were being spread by the officers Du Yanchang (都延昌) and Wang Xingben (王行本). He put Du and Wang to death by cutting them in halves at the waist. He then proceeded to attend the feast at Li's house without any guards accompanying him. Li, in gratitude for this show of trust, knelt down to him and cried, stating, "This old soldier can only die to repay your grace." It was said that this incident led the generals to have greater attachment to Meng.

In fall 930, Meng and Dong formally rose against the imperial government. Meng sent Li to command the army against the imperially-held Wuxin Circuit (武信, headquartered in modern Suining, Sichuan), with Zhao Tingyin serving as his deputy and Zhang serving as his forward commander. Li shortly after put Wuxin's capital Sui Prefecture (遂州) under siege, with the imperial general Xia Luqi (夏魯奇) the military governor of Wuxin defending. When Xia sent his officer Kang Wentong (康文通) out of the city to battle Li, Kang, hearing that the previously imperially held Baoning Circuit (保寧, headquartered in modern Nanchong, Sichuan) had already fallen to the joint Dongchuan/Xichuan army, surrendered to Li. In spring 931, Sui Prefecture fell to Li; Xia committed suicide.

Meng then commissioned Li as the acting military governor of Wuxin, and sent him with a fleet east to try to capture the Three Gorges region from defending imperial generals. Li quickly captured Zhong (忠州) and Wan (萬州) Prefectures (both in modern Chongqing), and then approached Kui Prefecture (夔州, also in modern Chongqing). The imperially-commissioned military governor of Ningjiang Circuit (寧江, headquartered at Kui), An Chongruan (安崇阮) abandoned Kui and fled back to secure imperial territory, allowing Li to take control of Ningjiang. He remained in the region for some time, and in winter 931, he returned to Chengdu.

By this point, the imperial government had effectively capitulated, as Li Siyuan had withdrawn the main imperial army against the two circuits, commanded by his son-in-law Shi Jingtang, and had executed his chief of staff An Chonghui, the main proponent for the campaign against the two circuits. Li Siyuan sought rapprochement with the two circuits, and Meng wanted reconciliation with the imperial government, but Dong did not, and instead attacked Xichuan. Meng's counterattack defeated Dong (with Zhao Tingyin playing a large part in the Xichuan victory), and Dong's officers subsequently killed him and surrendered Dongchuan to Meng. Li subsequently rendezvoused with Zhao at Dongchuan's capital Zi Prefecture (梓州), and Zhao personally went to welcome Li's arrival. Instead of acknowledging Zhao's accomplishments in defeating Dong, however, Li insulted Zhao, causing Zhao to become resentful of him. When Meng himself subsequently arrived at Zi as well, he summoned Li and Zhao, asking them which of the two of them would be suitable to be the military governor of Dongchuan, believing that one of them would support the other, he was surprised that Li only made the comment of, "Even if you, Lord, want to give me Shu Prefecture [(蜀州, in modern Chengdu — which Li might have one point served as the prefect of)] again, I will accept it" and that Zhao was completely silent. Subsequently, with the two of them at a standoff, Meng decided to assume the military governorship of Dongchuan himself to avoid having Li and Zhao continue to struggle over it. He subsequently commissioned Li as the full military governor of Wuxin, and Zhao the military governor of Baoning.

In 934, Meng claimed imperial title as emperor of a new state of Later Shu. He made Li Renhan one of the generals commanding his imperial guards, but continued to let Li also serve as the military governor of Wuxin. It was said that many senior Later Shu generals at that time were arrogant and pillaging the people, often abusing the law to seize people's good fields and even destroying tombs, with Li and Zhang Ye being among the worst offenders. Li had used these tactics to become very wealthy. He had also wanted to marry a concubine of a Former Shu emperor who was very beautiful, but was concerned that Meng would rebuke him for doing so, and therefore did not do so.

== Death ==
Meng Zhixiang died later in 934, leaving a will for his son Meng Renzan (who then changed his name to Meng Chang) to succeed to the throne, and entrusting Meng Chang to the chancellor Zhao Jiliang, Li Renhan, Zhao Tingyin, the chief of staff Wang Chuhui, and the imperial guard generals Zhang Gongduo and Hou Hongshi (侯洪實). (Upon Meng Zhixiang's death, Wang, who served inside the palace, immediately informed Zhao Jiliang, but when Zhao then sent him to inform Li, Wang was intimidated by the fact that Li only agreed to see him after surrounding himself with guards, and therefore did not immediately inform Li at that time, until Meng Chang had taken the throne.)

Immediately after Meng Chang's assumption of the throne, Li Renhan insisted on being put in command of the imperial guards. Meng Chang initially reluctantly agreed and put him in command, making Zhao Tingyin his deputy. Meng Chang also gave him the honorary chancellor designation Zhongshu Ling (中書令). However, Zhang Gongduo and several of Meng Chang's close associates thereafter accused Li Renhan of plotting treason. After consulting with Zhao Jiliang and Zhao Tingyin, Meng decided to arrest him while he was attending an imperial meeting, and then put him to death, along with his son Li Jihong (李繼宏) and several associates. (Shocked by the development, the senior general Li Zhao (李肇), who had previously refused to bow to the young emperor, changed his attitude and became very submissive. Meng's associates advocated putting Li Zhao to death, too, but Meng did not do so, instead forcing Li Zhao into retirement.)

== Notes and references ==
- Spring and Autumn Annals of the Ten Kingdoms, vol. 51.
- Zizhi Tongjian, vols. 274, 277, 278, 279.
