= Zhao Tingyin =

Zhao Tingyin (趙廷隱) (883-January 949), formally Prince Zhongwu of Song (宋忠武王), was a major general of the Chinese Five Dynasties and Ten Kingdoms Period state Later Shu.

== Background ==
Zhao Tingyin was born in 883, during the reign of Emperor Xizong of Tang. He was from Kaifeng. His early military career was in the Later Liang army, and he became an officer under the prominent general Wang Yanzhang.

== During Later Tang ==
In 923, Li Cunxu, the emperor of Later Liang's archrival to the north, Later Tang, decided to launch a surprise attack on Later Liang's capital Daliang (i.e., Kaifeng), through Yun Prefecture (鄆州, in modern Tai'an, Shandong). Wang Yanzhang's army, poorly-manned, was the only Later Liang army standing between him and Daliang, and he attacked, defeated, and captured Wang. Zhao Tingyin was also captured at that time, along with other officers Zhang Hanjie (張漢傑), Li Zhijie (李知節), and Liu Sibin (劉嗣彬). Shortly after, with Li Cunxu's army approaching Daliang, Later Liang's last emperor Zhu Zhen committed suicide, ending Later Liang. Its territory came under Later Tang's control.

Zhao's career apparently continued in the Later Tang army, although his activities the next few years were not recorded in historical records. It is known that he was an officer in Later Tang's army that conquered Former Shu in 925. When, in 926, after the conquest, the Later Tang commander of that invasion army, Li Jiji the Prince of Wei (the son of Li Cunxu) was prepared to depart Chengdu (the capital of the destroyed Former Shu state) and return to Later Tang's capital Luoyang, he left a detachment, commanded by several officers — Zhao, Li Renhan, Pan Rensi (潘仁嗣), Zhang Ye (Li Renhan's nephew), Wu Zhang (武璋), and Li Tinghou (李廷厚) — at Chengdu, to await the arrival of the new Later Tang-commissioned military governor of Xichuan Circuit (西川, headquartered at Chengdu), Meng Zhixiang, to arrive. Apparently, then, when Meng subsequently arrived to take office, Zhao and those other officers came under his command. Even after Meng's arrival, however, there was much banditry throughout the former Former Shu territory. Meng sent Zhao and Zhang to quell the banditry, and they killed the bandits and calmed the land.

By 930, the relationships that Meng Zhixiang and Dong Zhang the military governor of neighboring Dongchuan Circuit (東川, headquartered in modern Mianyang, Sichuan) with the imperial government, with Li Cunxu's adoptive brother Li Siyuan as emperor (Li Cunxu's having been killed in a mutiny at Luoyang in 926), had become very strained, and it appeared that war between the imperial government and these two circuits would erupt at any time. In fall 930, Meng and Dong formally rose against the imperial government. Meng sent Li Renhan to command the army against the imperially-held Wuxin Circuit (武信, headquartered in modern Suining, Sichuan), with Zhao, who then carried the title of prefect of Han Prefecture (漢州, in modern Deyang, Sichuan), serving as his deputy and Zhang serving as his forward commander. Li Renhan shortly after put Wuxin's capital Sui Prefecture (遂州) under siege. During the siege, however, news came that the main imperial army against the two circuits, commanded by Li Siyuan's son-in-law Shi Jingtang, had captured the key entry into the two circuits, Jianmen Pass. Meng thus diverted Zhao from Li Renhan's army, giving him 10,000 men to reinforce Dong's defenses at Jian Prefecture (劍州, in modern Guangyuan, Sichuan, near Jianmen Pass). At that time, it was deep in the winter, and Zhao's fearful soldiers initially did not want to advance to Jian. Zhao wept in front of them and stated: "Now the Northern Army [(i.e., the imperial army)] is strong. If you all do not fight hard to stop them, even your wives and children will be owned by others." The soldiers were aroused by his speech, and advanced to Jian.

Upon arriving at Jian, Zhao rendezvoused with another officer of Meng's, Li Zhao, and Dong's officer Wang Hui (王暉). When Shi attacked Jian, they used the rough terrain in the area, as well as their soldiers' archery skills, to impede Shi's attack, forcing Shi to retreat to Jianmen. Shi made another attack on Jian in spring 931, and Zhao again repelled him. By this point, Shi had tired of the campaign and did not believe victory was possible, and therefore, even before obtaining the permission of Li Siyuan (although Li Siyuan was preparing to abandon the campaign as well by this point), withdrew from the region, back to more-securely held imperial territory. The Xichuan and Dongchuan forces chased him to Li Prefecture (利州, in modern Guangyuan), the capital of Zhaowu Circuit (昭武), and seeing that Shi was withdrawing, the imperially-commissioned military governor of Zhaowu, Li Yanqi (李延琦), abandoned Li and withdrew as well. Meng commissioned Zhao as the acting military governor of Zhaowu. Meanwhile, hearing that Dong was coming to encourage the army, Zhao secretly informed Meng and requested permission to seize Dong, arguing to Meng that Dong was treacherous, and that seizing him would allow Meng to take control of Dongchuan easily. Meng refused, however, and when Dong visited Zhao, Zhao took no action but lamented his lack of authorization. Shortly after, Zhao and Li Zhao returned to Chengdu, leaving 5,000 men to guard Li Prefecture. Subsequently, in summer 931, Zhao returned to Li to take office. He then suggested to Meng that he be given an army to attack the imperially-held Xingyuan Municipality (興元, in modern Hanzhong, Shaanxi) and Qin (秦州, in modern Tianshui, Gansu) and Feng (鳳州, in modern Baoji, Shaanxi) Prefectures. Meng, believing that the army had been worn out, declined. Zhao then repaired the walls of Li Prefecture, and then submitted a petition to Meng, pointing out that Li Zhao, like he, contributed to the victory at Jian Prefecture, and expressing that he was willing to yield Zhaowu to Li Zhao. Meng initially declined, but after Zhao offered again, agreed, sending Li Zhao to Zhaowu to serve as acting military governor and recalling Zhao to Chengdu.

With Li Siyuan having withdrawn the imperial army and made overtures of peace to both Meng and Dong (including executing his chief of staff An Chonghui, the main proponent of the campaign against the two circuits), Meng wanted peace with the imperial government as well and was willing to resubmit to Li Siyuan as a vassal. Dong, however, refused, as he was still angry at the imperial government for executing his son Dong Guangye (董光業). He soon launched an attack against Xichuan, and he sent letters to Zhao Tingyin, Zhao Jiliang, and Li Zhao, hoping that sending the letters would cause Meng to suspect the three of them, but Meng did not. Meng subsequently sent Zhao Tingyin to resist Dong, and followed himself with another army. Dong's attack was initially strong, capturing a number of Xichuan cities on the way to Chengdu, and when Zhao engaged Dong, Dong won the first three battles, but Zhao's counterattack crushed Dong's army, causing it to collapse and forcing Dong to flee back to Dongchuan's capital Zi Prefecture (梓州). Wang Hui and Dong's nephew Dong Yanhao (董延浩) then mutinied, and Dong was killed in the mutiny. When Zhao arrived at Zi, Wang surrendered the city, and Dong's head, to him. Meng subsequently arrived at Zi as well.

Li Renhan soon rendezvoused with Zhao and Meng, and Zhao personally went to welcome Li's arrival. Instead of acknowledging Zhao's accomplishments in defeating Dong, however, Li insulted Zhao, causing Zhao to become resentful of him. When Meng himself subsequently arrived at Zi as well, he summoned Li and Zhao, asking them which of the two of them would be suitable to be the military governor of Dongchuan, believing that one of them would support the other, he was surprised that Li only made the comment of, "Even if you, Lord, want to give me Shu Prefecture [(蜀州, in modern Chengdu — which Li might have one point served as the prefect of)] again, I will accept it" and that Zhao was completely silent. Subsequently, with the two of them at a standoff, Meng decided to assume the military governorship of Dongchuan himself to avoid having Li and Zhao continue to struggle over it. He subsequently commissioned Li as the military governor of Wuxin Circuit (武信, headquartered in modern Suining, Sichuan), and Zhao the military governor of Baoning Circuit (保寧, headquartered in modern Nanchong, Sichuan).

== During Later Shu ==
In 934, Meng Zhixiang claimed imperial title as emperor of a new state of Later Shu. Zhao Tingyin was made one of the imperial guard commanding generals, but continued to also serve as the military governor of Baoning.

Meng Zhixiang died later in 934, leaving a will for his son Meng Renzan (who then changed his name to Meng Chang) to succeed to the throne, and entrusting Meng Chang to the chancellor Zhao Jiliang, Li Renhan, Zhao Tingyin, the chief of staff Wang Chuhui, and the imperial guard generals Zhang Gongduo and Hou Hongshi (侯洪實).

Immediately after Meng Chang's assumption of the throne, Li Renhan insisted on being put in command of the imperial guards. Meng Chang initially reluctantly agreed and put him in command, making Zhao Tingyin his deputy. Meng Chang also gave Zhao the honorary chancellor designation Shizhong (侍中). However, Zhang Gongduo and several of Meng Chang's close associates thereafter accused Li Renhan of plotting treason. After consulting with Zhao Jiliang and Zhao Tingyin, Meng decided to arrest him while he was attending an imperial meeting, and then put him to death, along with his son Li Jihong (李繼宏) and several associates. (Shocked by the development, Li Zhao, who had previously refused to bow to the young emperor, changed his attitude and became very submissive. Meng's associates advocated putting Li Zhao to death, too, but Meng did not do so, instead forcing Li Zhao into retirement.)

In 941, as part of Meng Chang's reforms to end the practice of having high-level officials and generals hold office at the imperial government in Chengdu but continuing to serve also as military governors — as the result was that they were not attentive to their circuits, and their staff members would effectively rule the circuit and mismanage them — several high level officials/generals who were doing so, including Zhao, who was then the military governor of Wude Circuit (武德, i.e., Dongchuan), were given some additional honors but stripped of their military governorships. (For reasons unclear, in 944, Meng reversed his reform and again had high-level officials/generals assume military governorships, although it was not stated whether Zhao received the military governorship of Wude, or any other circuit, at that time.)

In 948, Zhang Ye, who was then serving as chancellor, was accused by Meng's close associates Sun Hanshao (孫漢韶), Li Hao, and An Siqian (安思謙). Zhang was put to death. An, wanting to also get rid of Zhao, also accused him of treason, and had soldiers surround his mansion. However, Li Tinggui (李廷珪) the military governor of Shannan West Circuit (山南西道, headquartered at Xingyuan) happened to be Chengdu at that time, and defended Zhao before Meng, so Zhao was spared. However, because of this incident, Zhao claimed to be ill and asked to be relieved of his military command. Meng agreed and allowed him to retire. Meng gave him the honorary titles Taifu (太傅) and Zhongshu Ling and created him the Prince of Song, and continued to consult him on important matters of state. He died in 949. His son Zhao Chongtao (趙崇韜) would be an important general later in Meng's reign.

== Notes and references ==
- Spring and Autumn Annals of the Ten Kingdoms, vol. 51.
- Records of the Nine Kingdoms (九國志), vol. 7.
- Zizhi Tongjian, vols. 272, 274, 277, 279, 282, 288.
