= Zhang Ye (Later Shu) =

Chinese official and general (died 948)

Zhang Ye (張業) (died 24 August 948), né Zhang Zhiye (張知業), was a general and official of the Chinese Five Dynasties and Ten Kingdoms period states Later Tang and Later Shu, serving as a chancellor during the reign of Later Shu's second emperor Meng Chang.

== During Later Tang ==
It is not known when Zhang Ye was born. But he was said to be from Junyi (浚儀, in modern Kaifeng, Henan). His early career was not well-documented in history, but it is known that he was an officer in the Later Tang army that conquered Former Shu in 925. When in 926 after the conquest, the Later Tang commander of that invasion army, Li Jiji the Prince of Wei (the son of then-Later Tang emperor Li Cunxu) was prepared to depart Chengdu (the capital of the destroyed Former Shu state) and return to Later Tang's capital Luoyang, he left a detachment, commanded by the officers Li Renhan, Pan Rensi (潘仁嗣), Zhao Tingyin, Zhang Ye, Wu Zhang (武璋) and Li Tinghou (李廷厚), at Chengdu to await the arrival of the new Later Tang-commissioned military governor of Xichuan Circuit (西川, headquartered at Chengdu), Meng Zhixiang, to arrive. (Apparently, then, when Meng subsequently arrived to take office, Li and those other officers came under his command.) Zhang Ye was subsequently involved in suppressing the remaining popular uprisings against Meng in the region, and was commissioned the prefect of Jian Prefecture (簡州, in modern Ziyang, Sichuan).

By 930, the relationships that Meng Zhixiang and Dong Zhang the military governor of neighboring Dongchuan Circuit (東川, headquartered in modern Mianyang, Sichuan) with the imperial government, with Li Cunxu's adoptive brother Li Siyuan as emperor (Li Cunxu's having been killed in a mutiny at Luoyang in 926), had become very strained, and it appeared that war between the imperial government and these two circuits would erupt at any time. At that juncture, there was a time when Li Renhan and Zhang Ye invited Meng to a feast. This led to a rumor, of which a Buddhist nun informed Meng, that the two of them were intending to assassinate Meng at the feast. Meng investigated, found no proof of the assassination plot, and eventually discovered that the rumors were being spread by the officers Du Yanchang (都延昌) and Wang Xingben (王行本). He put Du and Wang to death by cutting them in halves at the waist. He then proceeded to attend the feast at Li's house without any guards accompanying him. Li, in gratitude for this show of trust, knelt down to him and cried, stating, "This old soldier can only die to repay your grace." It was said that this incident led the generals to have greater attachment to Meng.

In the fall of 930, Meng and Dong formally rose against the imperial government. Meng sent Li to command the army against the imperially-held Wuxin Circuit (武信, headquartered in modern Suining, Sichuan), with Zhao Tingyin serving as his deputy and Zhang serving as his forward commander. Li shortly after put Wuxin's capital Sui Prefecture (遂州) under siege, with the imperial general Xia Luqi (夏魯奇) the military governor of Wuxin defending. In spring 931, Sui Prefecture fell to Li; Xia committed suicide. For Zhang's accomplishments during the Sui siege, Meng made him the acting military governor of Ningjiang Circuit (寧江, headquartered in modern Chongqing), and subsequently, even after he had a temporary rapprochement with the Later Tang imperial government, Meng issued an order on his own making Zhang the full military governor of Ningjiang, which Li Siyuan subsequently confirmed.

== During Later Shu ==
In 934, Meng Zhixiang declared himself the emperor of a new state of Later Shu, independent of Later Tang, which was then ruled by Li Siyuan's son and successor Li Conghou. He made Zhang Ye one of the commanders of his imperial guards, but still carrying the title of military governor of Ningjiang.

Meng died later in the year, and was succeeded by his son Meng Chang. Upon Meng Chang's succession, he believed that the arrogance that Li Renhan displayed showed treasonous intentions, and he had Li put to death. As Zhang was then an imperial guard commander and Meng Chang feared that he would rebel as a result, he made Zhang a chancellor (with the designation Tong Zhongshu Menxia Pingzhangshi (同中書門下平章事) to comfort him. When, shortly after, Li Conghou's adoptive brother Li Congke overthrew Li Conghou and became Later Tang's emperor, the Later Tang general Zhang Qianzhao (張虔釗) the military governor of Shannan West Circuit (山南西道, headquartered in modern Hanzhong, Shaanxi), who was one of the generals Li Conghou had previously sent against Li Congke, surrendered his Shannan West Circuit to Later Shu (along with Sun Hanshao (孫漢韶) the military governor of Wuding Circuit (武定, also headquartered in modern Hanzhong)), it was Zhang that Meng sent to accept their surrender, take over the two circuits for Later Shu, and return the surrendered general to Chengdu.

Zhang's military governorship was apparently later moved from Ningjiang to Wuxin Circuit, for he was referred to by that title (in addition to his chancellor title) in 938. At that time, he was given the additional titles of Zuo Pushe (左僕射, one of the heads of the executive bureau of government (尚書省, Shangshu Sheng) and Zhongshu Shilang (中書侍郎, deputy head of the legislative bureau (中書省)), while his Wuxin governorship was given to fellow chancellor Wang Chuhui. He was later given the honorary title of Sikong (司空, one of the Three Excellencies). In 940, when his senior chancellor colleague Zhao Jiliang proposed that the responsibilities for overseeing the three financial agencies (taxation, treasury, and salt and iron monopolies) be divided between Zhao himself as well as Wu Zhaoyi and Zhang, Meng put Zhao in charge of taxation, Wu in charge of salt and iron monopolies, and Zhang in charge of the treasury.

By 948, Zhang, who had long been chancellor, was by reputation known as arrogant and wasteful, and he had seized many people's properties, drawing resentment. He was also protecting fugitives and putting people who owed him money in jail. His son Zhang Jizhao (張繼昭) was a swordsman and had gone with the Buddhist monk Guixin (歸信) to recruit capable swordsmen to serve under him as well, drawing greater suspicion. Sun Hanshao, who was then an imperial guard commander and who had previous conflicts with Zhang Ye, thus submitted an accusation to Meng that Zhang Ye and Zhang Jizhao were plotting treason. The imperial scholar Li Hao and the officer An Siqian (安思謙) concurred in these accusations. Meng thus put Zhang Ye and Zhang Jizhao to death. Meng then issued an edict publicizing Zhang Ye's crimes and confiscating his assets.

== Notes and references ==
- Spring and Autumn Annals of the Ten Kingdoms, vol. 51.
- Zizhi Tongjian, vols. 274, 277, 279, 281, 282, 288.
