= Adalhard of Metz =

9th-century Count of Metz and Mozelgau

Adalhard II
- Count of Metz and Mozelgau
- Tenure: 872–890
- Born: c. 840
- Died: 2 January 890 (aged 49–50)
- Spouse: Adalarda
- Issue: Stephen of Metz; Gerhard I of Metz; Matfried of Metz; Richert of Metz
- Father: Adalard the Seneschal

Adalhard II (c. 840 – 2 January (?) 890) was Count of Metz and Mozelgau. He was probably the son of Adalard the Seneschal.

== Biography ==
=== Rule ===
Adalard is mentioned in documents from between the years 872 and 890 as Count in Metz and Mozelgau. Also in the years 878 to 890 he is referred to as the lay abbot of Echternach. On the basis of onomastics, and because before him this monastery was owned by Adalard the Seneschal, it is assumed that Adalard II is his son.

=== Marriage and children ===
His wife's name is listed as Adalarda in sources not mentioned. On the basis of onomastic data the historian Eduard Hlawitschka believes that his wife Adalarda was the daughter of Matfrida II, count of Ayfelgau. Their children were:

- Stephen (d. aft. 900), Count of Chamonix and Bidgau
- Gerhard (Gerard) I (c. 870/875 – 22 Jun 910), count of Metz from 890
- Matfried (d. 19 Aug c. 930), Count of Metz
- Richert (Richer) (d. 23 Jul 945), abbot of Prüm 899, Bishop of Liège 920

== Sources ==
- Le Jan, Régine (2003). Famille et pouvoir dans le monde franc (VIIe-Xe siècle), Essai d'anthropologie sociale (in French). Éditions de la Sorbonne.
- Maclean, Simon, ed. (2009). History and politics in late Carolingian and Ottonian Europe: The Chronicle of Regino of Prüm and Adalbert of Magdeburg. Manchester University Press. p. 213. ISBN 978-1-5261-1280-4.
