= Bertulf (archbishop of Trier) =

German Catholic archbishop

- Archbishop of Trier
- Church: Catholic Church
- Diocese: Electorate of Trier
- In office: 869–883

Personal details
- Died: 883

Bertulf (or Bartholf or Barthold) (died 883) was the Archbishop of Trier from 869 until his death.

After the Archbishop of Trier Theotgaud was excommunicated by Pope Nicholas I in October 863 in Rome and deposed, and died in Rome in 868, Charles the Bald managed in 869 to have his candidate, Bertulf, appointed as Theotgaud's successor and confirmed by the Pope. Bertulf had previously been abbot of Mettlach. His election ended the long period of sede vacante. Charles also awarded the new archbishop the crown estate of Merzig.

The election of Bertulf was a provocation to Louis the German, who then set up his own candidate. This was Bertulf's brother Waldo, abbot of St. Maximin's Abbey in Trier. Eight years previously, he had been convicted of disloyalty at the Imperial Diet in Regensburg along with his brothers Udo and Berengar and their uncle Ernest, and like them, had been stripped of his offices and titles. His candidacy, however, foundered at the opposition of the other Archbishops.

On 26 September 870, Bertulf attended a synod at Cologne along with the other Rhenish metropolitans, Liutbert and Willibert, and reconsecrated Cologne Cathedral.

== Sources ==
Preceded by Theotgaud	Archbishop of Trier; 869–883	Succeeded by Ratbod
