= Dong Zhang =

Dong Zhang (Chinese: 董璋) (died June 10, 932) was a Chinese military general and politician of the Chinese Five Dynasties and Ten Kingdoms period Later Liang and Later Tang states. After submitting to Later Tang after Later Liang's destruction, he became a general favored by both Later Tang's founding emperor Li Cunxu and Li Cunxu's chief of staff Guo Chongtao, causing Guo to commission Dong as the military governor (jiedushi) of Dongchuan Circuit (東川, headquartered in modern Mianyang, Sichuan) after Guo's conquest of Former Shu. Because of this, after Li Cunxu's downfall and succession by his adoptive brother Li Siyuan, Li Siyuan's chief of staff An Chonghui came to suspect both Dong and Meng Zhixiang, the military governor of neighboring Xichuan Circuit (西川, headquartered in modern Chengdu, Sichuan). Dong and Meng jointly rebelled against Li Siyuan and were successful military, forcing the imperial government to eventually move into a reconciliatory posture. Dong, however, as his son Dong Guangye (董光業) and Dong Guangye's family were slaughtered, refused the imperial overture, and later launched an attack on Meng, as Meng was moving to reconciliation with the imperial government. Meng defeated him, and he was later killed by his own subordinates.

== Background ==
It is not known when or where Dong Zhang was born, but it was known that he, along with later prominent political figures Gao Jixing and Kong Xun, served as servant boys under the merchant Li Rang (李讓) of Bian Prefecture (汴州, in modern Kaifeng, Henan). While the late-Tang dynasty major warlord Zhu Quanzhong (who would later take over the Tang throne and establish Later Liang) served as the military governor of Xuanwu Circuit (宣武, headquartered at Bian Prefecture), Zhu took Li as an adoptive son (changing his name to Zhu Yourang (朱友讓)), and Li's servants thus got the chance to serve in Zhu Quanzhong's army. Dong later was promoted to be an officer in the army.

== During Later Liang ==
As of 923, Zhu Quanzhong's son Zhu Zhen was Later Liang's emperor. That year, Li Jitao (the son Li Sizhao, the deceased cousin of Later Liang's archrival Later Tang's emperor Li Cunxu), who then controlled Anyi Circuit (安義, headquartered in modern Changzhi, Shanxi), in fear that Li Cunxu would eventually act against him, surrendered his circuit to Later Liang. Pei Yue (裴約), the prefect of Ze Prefecture (澤州, in modern Jincheng, Shanxi), which belonged to Anyi, refused to abide by this decision, and instead remained faithful to Later Tang. Zhu sent Dong Zhang to attack Ze, later sending the major general Wang Yanzhang to reinforce his troops. Li Cunxu sent his general Li Shaobin to try to aid Pei, with the explicit instruction to give up Ze to Later Liang, only rescuing Pei. Before Li Shaobin could arrive there, though, Dong had already captured the city, and Pei was killed in the city's fall. Zhu commissioned Dong as the prefect of Ze.

Later in the year, Dong was part of the ambitious plan drafted by the Later Liang major general Duan Ning to launch a four-prong attack on Later Tang to try to reverse years of Later Liang losses to Later Tang's predecessor state Jin:

1. Dong would head toward the major Later Tang city Taiyuan (formerly Jin's capital).
2. Huo Yanwei would head toward Zhen Prefecture (鎮州, in modern Baoding, Hebei).
3. Wang Yanzhang and Zhang Hanjie (張漢傑) would head toward Yun Prefecture (鄆州, in modern Tai'an, Shandong, recently captured by the Later Tang general Li Siyuan (Li Cunxu's adoptive brother)).
4. Duan himself, along with Du Yanqiu, would confront Later Tang's emperor Li Cunxu near then-Later Tang capital Xingtang (興唐, in modern Handan, Hebei).

Before Duan could launch the plan, however, Li Cunxu crossed the Yellow River and joined Li Siyuan, and then defeated Wang and Zhang. He then headed toward Daliang (i.e., Bian Prefecture), then Later Liang's capital, which was left defenseless by Duan's plan (which required the engagement of the entire Later Liang imperial army). Believing that the situation was hopeless as the Later Tang army approached, Zhu committed suicide, ending Later Liang. Li Cunxu entered Daliang and took over Later Liang's territory.

== During Later Tang ==
=== During Li Cunxu's reign ===
After Later Liang's fall, Dong Zhang (as did virtually all other Later Liang-commissioned regional governors) went to Daliang to pay homage to the Later Tang emperor. Li Cunxu had long heard of Dong, and treated him well, returning him to his post at Ze. In 924, he was part of the Later Tang deployment in the northern boundary with the Khitan Empire to defend against possible Khitan incursions. Overall, Dong served at Ze for more than a year there before being replaced and recalled to then-Later Tang capital Luoyang. At that time, the paramount figure at court was Li's chief of staff Guo Chongtao, and Guo treated him well as well. In the summer of 925, Dong was first made acting military governor of Jingnan Circuit (靜難, headquartered in modern Xianyang, Shaanxi), and shortly after made its full military governor.

In fall 925, Li Cunxu launched a major campaign against Later Tang's southwestern neighbor Former Shu, commissioning his son Li Jiji the Prince of Wei as the titular commander of the operations, but with Guo serving as Li Jiji's deputy and actually being in command of the operations. Dong was assigned as a general serving under Guo during the operations. As Guo was close to him, Guo often consulted him on decisions—which angered Li Shaochen, a more senior general under Guo who had greater accomplishments (including during the Former Shu campaign itself). After Former Shu's emperor Wang Zongyan surrendered to Li Jiji and Guo, there were occasions on which Li Shaochen publicly rebuked Dong, at one point threatening to find a reason to put Dong to death under military law. When Dong informed Guo this, Guo decided to exercise imperial authority Li Cunxu delegated to him and commission Dong as the military governor of Dongchuan Circuit and relieve Dong's military responsibilities (so that Li Shaochen would not have any excuse to use military law against Dong).

Shortly after, though, Guo himself fell under the suspicions of both Li Cunxu and Li Cunxu's wife Empress Liu—that he was planning to take over Shu lands and rebel. Li Cunxu was reluctant to act against Guo without further evidence, but Empress Liu decided to act. She issued an order herself, ordering Li Jiji to put Guo to death. After some hesitation, Li Jiji carried out her order and put Guo to death. After Guo's death, Dong was briefly apprehensive of Li Shaochen and apologized to him. However, subsequently, it was Dong, not Li Shaochen, who received Li Cunxu's order to carry out the execution against Zhu Lingde (朱令德) the military governor of Wuxin Circuit (武信, headquartered in modern Suining, Sichuan), the son of Guo's ally Zhu Youqian, who was also put to death when Guo was killed. Dong was subsequently again disrespectful to Li Shaochen, causing Li Shaochen to, in fear and anger, rebel against Li Jiji. (However, Li Shaochen was shortly after defeated by Ren Huan, whose forces were reinforced by Dong and Meng Zhixiang, whom Li Cunxu had commissioned as the military governor of Xichuan; he was then captured and executed.)

=== Initial submission to Li Siyuan ===
Li Cunxu himself, however, was shortly later killed in a mutiny at Luoyang. One of the generals who had previously rebelled against him, his adoptive brother Li Siyuan, quickly arrived at Luoyang and claimed imperial title. Dong Zhang was apparently initially submissive to Li Siyuan, and was granted the honorific title of acting Taifu (太傅), and in 927 was given the honorary chancellor designation of Tong Zhongshu Menxia Pingzhangshi (同中書門下平章事).

The attitudes of Li Siyuan and his powerful chief of staff An Chonghui toward Dong was described differently in different historical sources. The Zizhi Tongjian indicated that An became immediately suspicious that it would be difficult to control Dong and Meng Zhixiang due to their isolated locations and command of large armies and that he was particularly apprehensive of Meng because Meng's wife was a sister of Li Cunxu's, while Dong's biographies in both the History of the Five Dynasties and New History of the Five Dynasties indicated that An was only initially suspicious of Meng and in fact, at the urging of his associates, tried to cultivate a relationship with Dong, believing that Dong could be a strong counterbalance to Meng; further, Dong's son Dong Guangye (董光業), who was serving in the palace, was fostering that perception. Regardless, though, An dispatched the officials Li Yan (李嚴) to Xichuan to serve as the monitor of its army, and Zhu Hongzhao to Dongchuan to serve as Dong's deputy military governor, apparently with the intent to have both Li and Zhu guard imperial interests in these circuits. However, upon Li's arrival at Xichuan, Meng executed him, and Zhu, in fear that the same thing would happen to him, found an excuse to return to Luoyang. Still, later in 926, when the imperial government declared a general campaign against Gao Jixing, the recalcitrant military governor of Jingnan Circuit (荊南, headquartered in modern Jingzhou, Hubei, not the same circuit that Dong himself had served at), Dong was at least nominally put in charge of the army that would attack Jingnan from the west (down the Yangtze River), which appeared to be actually commanded by Xifang Ye (西方鄴). Throughout this time, Dong and Meng also had an adversarial relationship, fighting over profits of the salt mines in the region. For a time, Dong tried to entice merchants from buying Dongchuan salt and transporting them to Xichuan for sale, flooding the Xichuan market. Meng reacted by setting up three tax collection stations on the two circuits' border at Han Prefecture (漢州, in modern Deyang, Sichuan) and imposing heavy taxes on Dongchuan salt, effectively ending the practice.

By 929, though, the relationship between Dong and the imperial government had deteriorated. Li Siyuan was about to offer sacrifices to heaven and earth (as was traditional for emperors), and he had the official Li Renju (李仁矩) go to Xichuan and Dongchuan to order them to submit tributes for the expenses of the sacrifices, commanding Xichuan to submit one million strings of money and Dongchuan 500,000. Both declined, claiming a lack of revenues, with Xichuan submitting only 500,000 and Dongchuan submitting only 100,000. Meanwhile, when Li Renju arrived at Dongchuan, Dong was preparing to hold a grand feast in his honor, but Li Renju, taking no heed, did not go to the feast on time and was instead frolicking with women. Dong, in anger, seized him and rebuked him, threatening to kill him. While Dong subsequently released Li Renju and tried to bribe him with gifts, when Li Renju returned to Luoyang, he still retaliated by accusing Dong of improprieties. Shortly after, there was another occasion when another imperial messenger, Li Yanxun (李彥珣), made ceremonial faux pas while at Dongchuan, and Dong arrested his subordinates, causing Li Yanxun to flee. These incidents caused the imperial government to become displeased at Dong.

As a result of his apprehension of both Meng and Dong, An began to carve out their territory and establishing circuits over those prefectures that he carved out that he considered faithful to the imperial government, with Xia Luqi (夏魯奇), who had been the deputy commander of the operations against Jingnan, made the military governor of Wuxin, Li Renju made the military governor of a new Baoning Circuit (保寧, headquartered in modern Langzhong, Sichuan), carved out of Dongchuan and Xichuan's neighboring Shannan West Circuit (山南西道, headquartered in modern Hanzhong, Shaanxi), and An's brother-in-law Wu Qianyu (武虔裕) the prefect of Mian Prefecture (綿州, in modern Mianyang), in the heart of Dongchuan itself. (Meng had effectively taken control of Wuxin earlier when Li Shaowen (李紹文) the military governor of Wuxin died in 927 and the imperial government abided by Meng's wishes by having Meng's officer Li Jingzhou (李敬周) made the acting military governor of Wuxin.) Further, there were rumors that An was ready to have Mian and nearby Long Prefecture (龍州, also in modern Mianyang) carved out of Dongchuan as a separate circuit.

These developments made both Meng Zhixiang and Dong Zhang apprehensive of the imperial government's attentions, and despite their prior animosity with each other, they began to negotiate an alliance, agreeing to have Dong's son marrying Meng's daughter; they also began to plan a joint resistance in case of an imperial operation against them. They then submitted a joint petition expressing their apprehension and objecting to the imperial establishment of these garrisons, to no avail. (Dong subsequently neutralized Wu by tricking him to Dongchuan's capital Zi Prefecture (梓州) and putting him under arrest.)

=== Joint rebellion with Meng Zhixiang ===
Dong Zhang and Meng Zhixiang subsequently submitted a joint petition, expressing their apprehensions about the imperial government's establishing of circuits and stationing of troops near them. Li Siyuan initially continued to sound conciliatory in his responsive edicts. The tension, though, continued to mount, and by fall 930, it was said that merchants were not daring to travel between imperially-held territory and the Dongchuan/Xichuan. Dong then made what he thought was a final attempt at peace—by having Dong Guangye inform An Chonghui's deputy Li Qianhui (李虔徽) that if the imperial government sent more soldiers into the region, he would rebel. (However, as noted by, inter alia, the modern historian Bo Yang, Dong's threat had the exact opposite effect, since An's intent was to force Dong and Meng into rebellion so that he could destroy them.) When An thereafter, in fall 930, sent the officer Xun Xian'ai (荀咸乂) to reinforce Baoning's capital Lang Prefecture (閬州), Dong publicly declared his rebellion, and he and Meng joined their forces to prepare to attack Baoning, Wuxin, and Zhaowu (昭武, headquartered in modern Guangyuan, Sichuan) Circuits, which were loyal to the imperial government. When the news came, An advocated a general campaign against them, and Li Siyuan agreed. He commissioned his son-in-law Shi Jingtang as the commander of the forces against Dongchuan (and, later, after Meng also publicly joined the rebellion, against Xichuan). He also ordered Dong Guangye and Dong Guangye's family executed.

Dong quickly captured Baoning's capital Lang Prefecture (閬州) and killed Li Renju and Li Renju's family. Meng's general Li Renhan, at the same time, put Xia under siege at Wuxin's capital Sui Prefecture (遂州). Dong then attacked Zhaowu's capital Li Prefecture (利州), but with his attacks hampered by torrential rains, withdrew to Lang—which caused Meng's consternation, as he believed that Dong's movement was leaving the important Jianmen Pass (which imperial forces must pass through if they were to attack Dongchuan and Xichuan) unguarded, but Meng's offers of troops to help defend Jianmen Pass was declined by Meng. In winter 930, Shi, finding Jianmen Pass not guarded well, sent a small detachment to launch a surprise attack against it and captured it, causing much alarm for both Dong and Meng. However, when Shi's subordinate Wang Hongzhi (王弘贄) then also captured nearby Jian Prefecture (劍州), he found Shi's main forces still far away, causing him to raid Jian's supplies but then withdraw. When the joint Dongchuan/Xichuan forces then arrived at Jian, the imperial forces lost their initiative, and the forces went into a stalemate.

By this time, though, An's political enemies were launching accusations against him—specifically, that he provoked Dongchuan and Xichuan into rebelling and led the imperial government into a draining war. An sought to head to the frontline to oversee the campaign, which Li Siyuan initially agreed. However, after An's departure from Luoyang, even one of An's allies, Zhu Hongzhao the military governor of Fengxiang Circuit (鳳翔, headquartered in modern Baoji, Shaanxi) accused him of planning to take over Shi's army, and with Shi himself arguing against the campaign, Li Siyuan ordered An's retirement, and made peace overtures to Dongchuan and Xichuan. Shi further thought the campaign against Dongchuan and Xichuan was hopeless when, in spring 931, Sui fell, and Xia Luqi committed suicide. Without first seeking approval from Li Siyuan, he withdrew the imperial forces, and Zhaowu's military governor Li Yanqi (李彥琦) abandoned Zhaowu and fled. Effectively, the joint Dongchuan/Xichuan forces had prevailed.

=== Attack on Meng Zhixiang and death ===
Shortly after, Li Siyuan put An Chonghui to death. He then issued a conciliatory edict, blaming the issues that the imperial government had with Meng Zhixiang, Dong Zhang, and Qian Liu the Prince of Wuyue on An. Hearing of this, and also hearing that his own family members remaining in imperial territory had been spared, Meng sent a dispatch to Dong, suggesting that they both resubmit to the imperial government. Dong refused, as his son Dong Guangye had already been killed, and from this point on the rivalry between the two circuits resumed. Dong, further, blocked off the communication paths between Xichuan and the imperial government. Meng, not yet wanting to turn against Dong, made several more overtures to Dong to jointly resubmit, with Dong refusing each one.

In summer 932, Dong decided to attack Xichuan's capital Chengdu. This initially caused apprehension in Meng's mind, as Dong was viewed as a fearsome general. However, Meng's deputy military governor Zhao Jiliang pointed out that Dong, while a ferocious soldier, did not actually inspire loyalty in his soldiers' mind, so Meng decided to resist. The two circuits' armies engaged at Han Prefecture (漢州, in modern Deyang, Sichuan). Initially, Dongchuan forces were victorious, but when Dong tried to advance further, he was defeated by Xichuan forces and suffered heavy losses. He fled back to Dongchuan's capital Zi Prefecture (梓州). After he arrived there, his officer Wang Hui (王暉) and nephew Dong Yanhao (董延浩) mutinied. When Dong Zhang tried to summon another officer, Pan Chou (潘稠), to combat the mutineers, Pan instead killed and beheaded him, offering his head to Wang. Wang then surrendered to Meng's general Zhao Tingyin.

== Notes and references ==
- History of the Five Dynasties, vol. 62.
- New History of the Five Dynasties, vol. 51.
- Zizhi Tongjian, vols. 272, 273, 274, 275, 276, 277.
